= Canedo =

Canedo may refer to:

== Places ==
=== Civil parish ===
- Canedo (Santa Maria da Feira)
- Canedo (Ribeira de Pena)
- Canedo (Vale e Vila Maior)

=== Municipality ===
- Senador Canedo

== People ==
Canedo or Cañedo is a toponymic surname. Notable people with the surname include:

- Alexander Cañedo (1902–1978), Mexican-American artist
- Beatriz Canedo Patiño (1950–2016), Bolivian fashion designer
- Caio Canedo Corrêa (born 1990), Brazilian footballer
- Carlos Cañedo (born 1975), Mexican-American musician, dancer, choreographer, and documentary producer
- Enrique Díez Canedo (1879–1944), Spanish postmodernist poet, translator, and literary critic.
- Guillermo Díez-Canedo (born 1982), Spanish slalom canoeist
- Guillermo Cañedo Malburg (born 1986), Mexican sports executive
- Juan de Dios Cañedo (1786–1850), Mexican statesman.
- Ken Canedo (born 1953), Filipino-American musician, composer and author
- Sara Guadalupe Figueroa Canedo (born 1956), Mexican politician
- Rafael Cañedo Benítez (1942–2001), Mexican businessman and politician
- Robert Cañedo (born 1984), Filipino footballer
- Roberto Cañedo (1918–1998), Mexican actor

== Other uses ==
- Canedo F.C., a Portuguese football club
