= Tiago Jogo =

Portuguese footballer

Personal information
- Full name: Tiago Miguel Pinho Jogo
- Date of birth: 23 April 1991 (age 35)
- Place of birth: Canedo, Portugal
- Height: 1.80 m (5 ft 11 in)
- Position: Midfielder

Team information
- Current team: Florgrade
- Number: 16

Youth career
- 2001–2006: Canedo
- 2006–2010: Feirense

Senior career*
Years	Team	Apps	(Gls)
2010–2017	Feirense	105	(4)
2010–2011	→ Ataense (loan)	32	(1)
2011–2012	→ Fiães (loan)	34	(7)
2016	→ Farense (loan)	13	(0)
2016–2017	→ Cesarense (loan)	12	(0)
2017	→ Gafanha (loan)	12	(1)
2017–2018	Olhanense	15	(0)
2018	Felgueiras	10	(0)
2019–2020	Olhanense	34	(1)
2020–2021	Torreense	7	(0)
2021–2022	Fiães	28	(1)
2022–	Florgrade	39	(3)
- * Club domestic league appearances and goals as of 19:01, 16 November 2023 (UTC)

Tiago Miguel Pinho Jogo (born 23 April 1991) is a Portuguese footballer who plays for Florgrade FC as a midfielder.
