= Castle of Castelo Mendo =

Castle in Castelo Mendo, Guarda, Portugal

Coordinates: 40°35′32″N 6°56′59″W

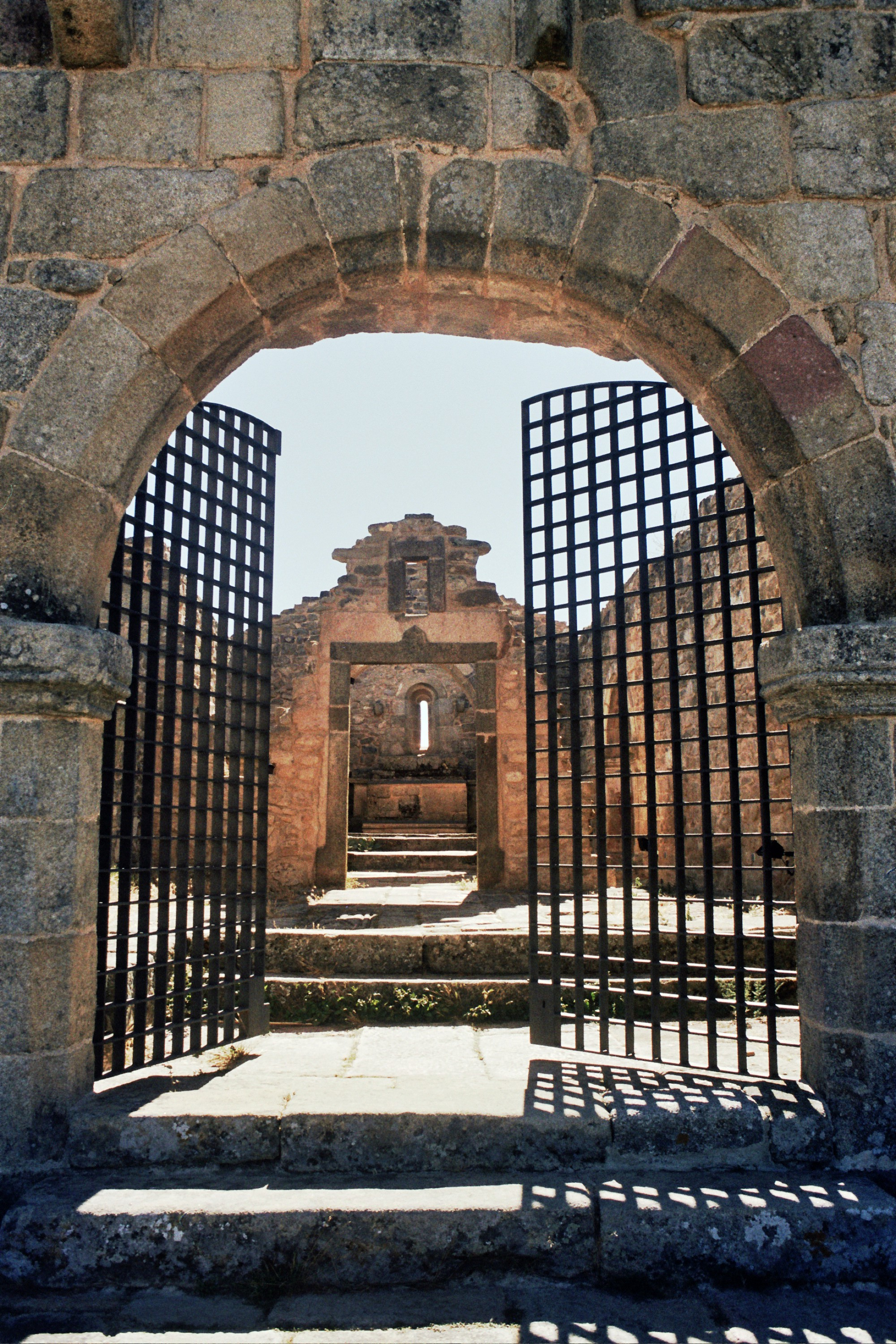
Castle of Castelo Mendo, Chapel

Castelo de Castelo Mendo is a castle in Almeida, Portugal. The castle stands at an altitude of 762 meters above the Côa River, and has been classified as a National Monument since 1946.

== History ==
The internal structures of the castle date back to the prehistoric Castro culture, and was further developed under the reign of Sancho I of Portugal. In 1229, Sancho II of Portugal granted the settlement a Charter, notably creating a free street market which helped develop the village economically, and likely establishing a stronghold at this time due to its strategic position in defending the Riba-Côa border. A second wall was built during the reign of Denis of Portugal, though due to the Alcanizes Treaty which reestablished the borders, the site soon lost its strategic potential.
