= Vilar Formoso =

Town and civil parish in Almeida, Portugal

- Civil parish
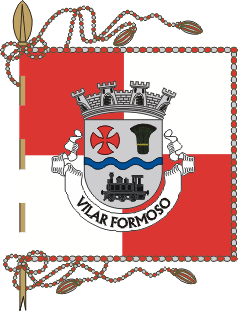
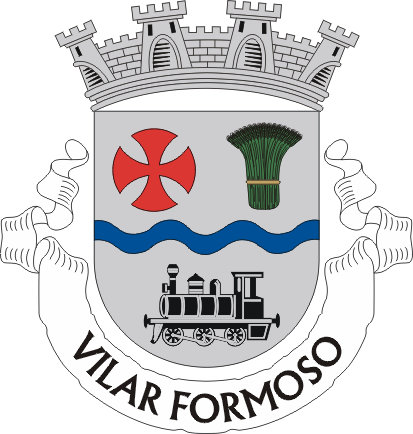
- Flag Coat of arms

- Location in Portugal
- Coordinates: 40.608°N 6.830°W
- Country: Portugal
- Region: Centro
- Intermunic. comm.: Beiras e Serra da Estrela
- District: Guarda
- Municipality: Almeida

Area
  - Total: 15.14 km^{2} (5.85 sq mi)

Population (2011)
  - Total: 2,219
  - Density: 146.6/km^{2} (379.6/sq mi)
- Time zone: UTC+00:00 (WET)
  - Summer (DST): UTC+01:00 (WEST)

Vilar Formoso is a town and civil parish in the municipality of Almeida, Portugal. The population in 2011 was 2,219, in an area of 15.14 km^{2}. One of the most important crossings on the Portugal–Spain border is located just next to the town.

Vilar Formoso has a railroad station where the erstwhile Lisbon-Hendaye express stopped daily. The station is covered with azulejo tile murals depicting scenes from all over Portugal, including a rare skiing scene.

== History ==
Portugal and Spain signed the Schengen Agreement in June 1991 which came into effect on 26 March 1995, making Portugal and Spain part of the Schengen area and thus the border then became an Open border, making travel between countries of the European Union unrestricted, the customs booths became unmanned and traffic passed through freely.

During World War II, in June 1940, the railway station at Vilar Formoso was briefly the location for the arrival in Portugal by train and car of numerous Jewish and other refugees escaping from the Nazis. The Vilar Formoso Fronteira da Paz memorial museum, situated at the station, records these events.

From 16 March 2020 to 1 June 2020, due to the COVID-19 pandemic, Portugal and Spain reintroduced border controls, with tourists unable to cross, but cross-border workers and goods were still allowed to pass.

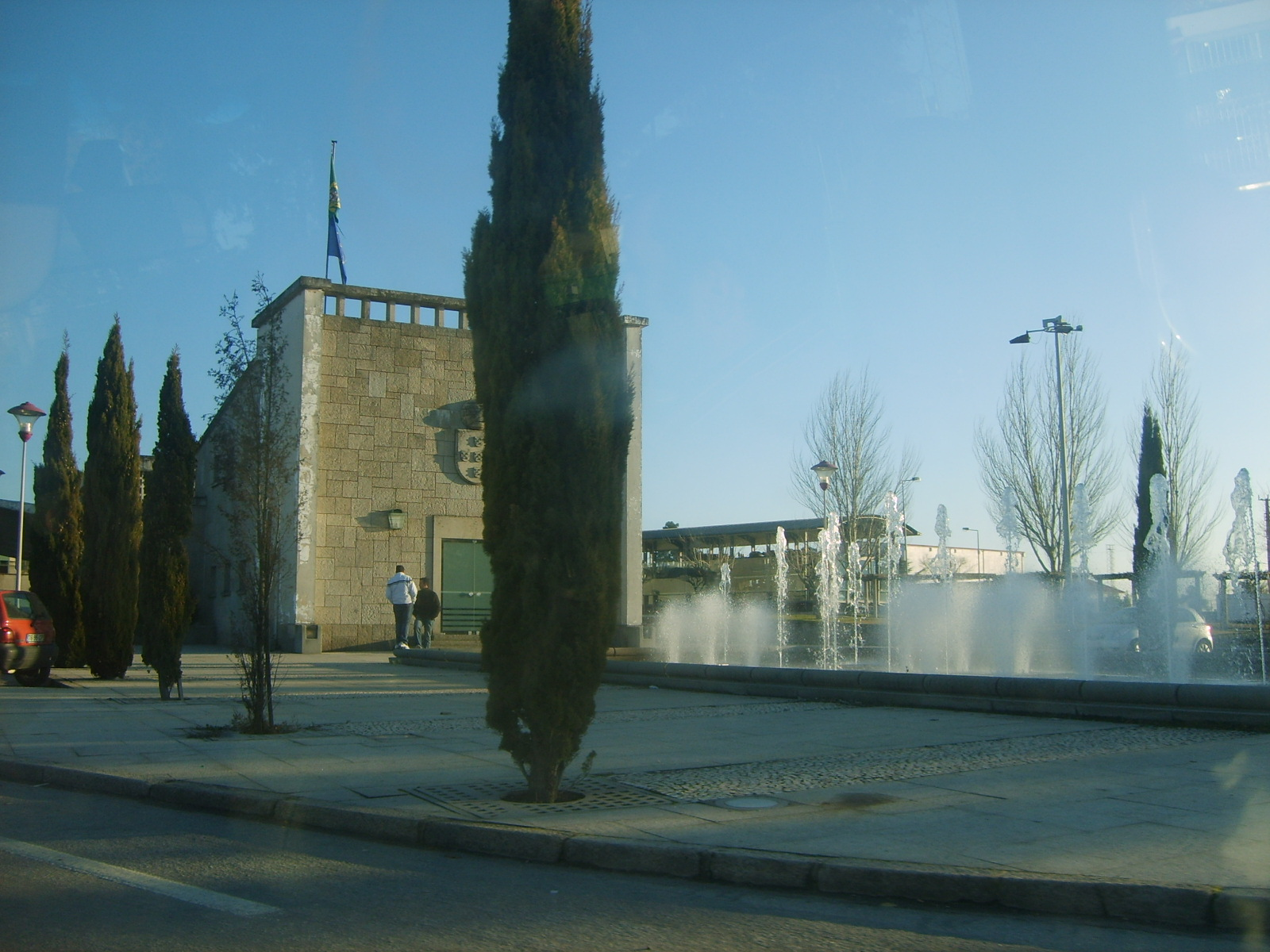
Fountain near the customs building, on the Portugal—Spain border

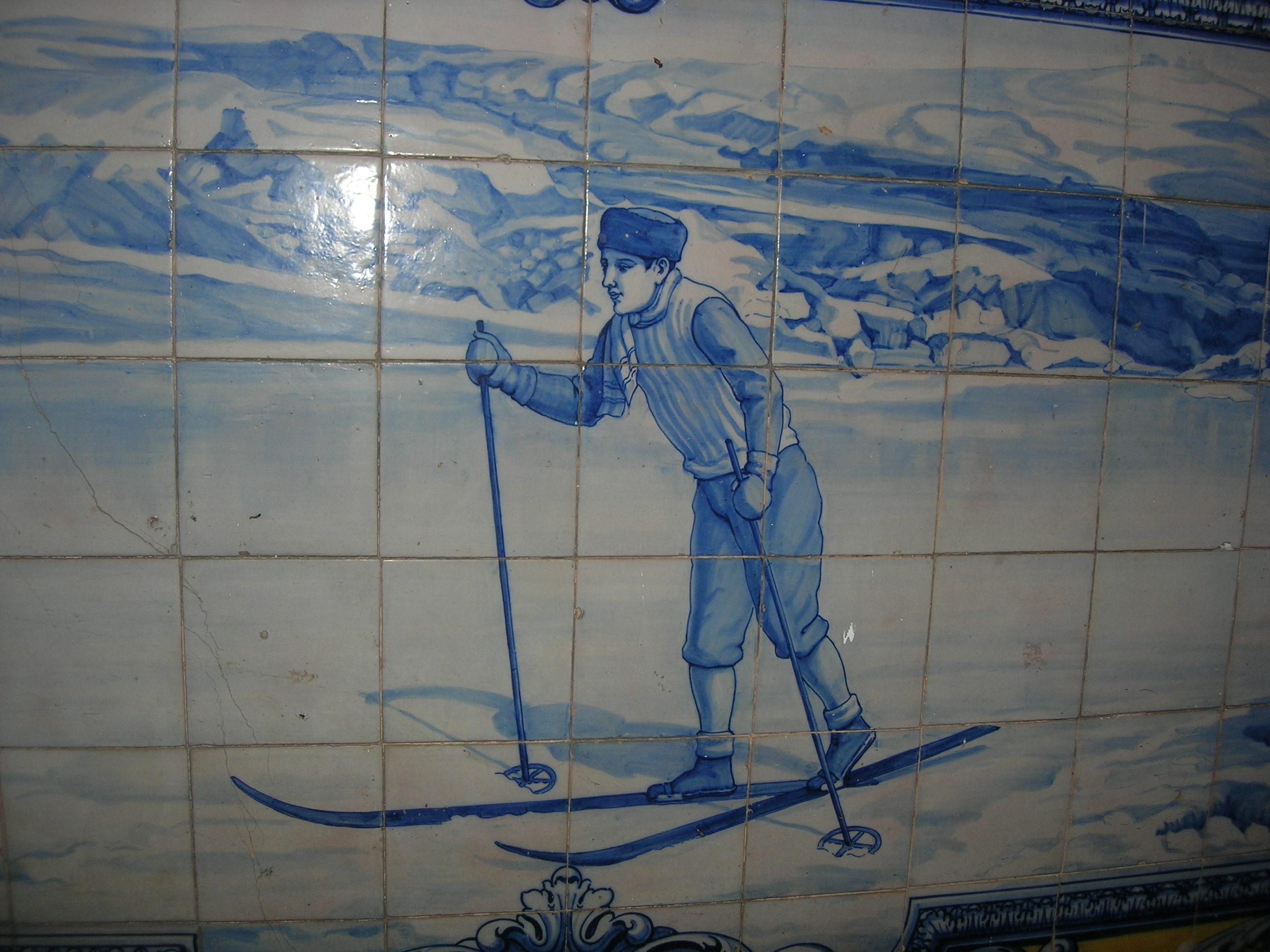
Mosaic depicting skiing, on north side of Vilar Formoso train station
