= Almeida, Portugal =

Almeida
- Municipality
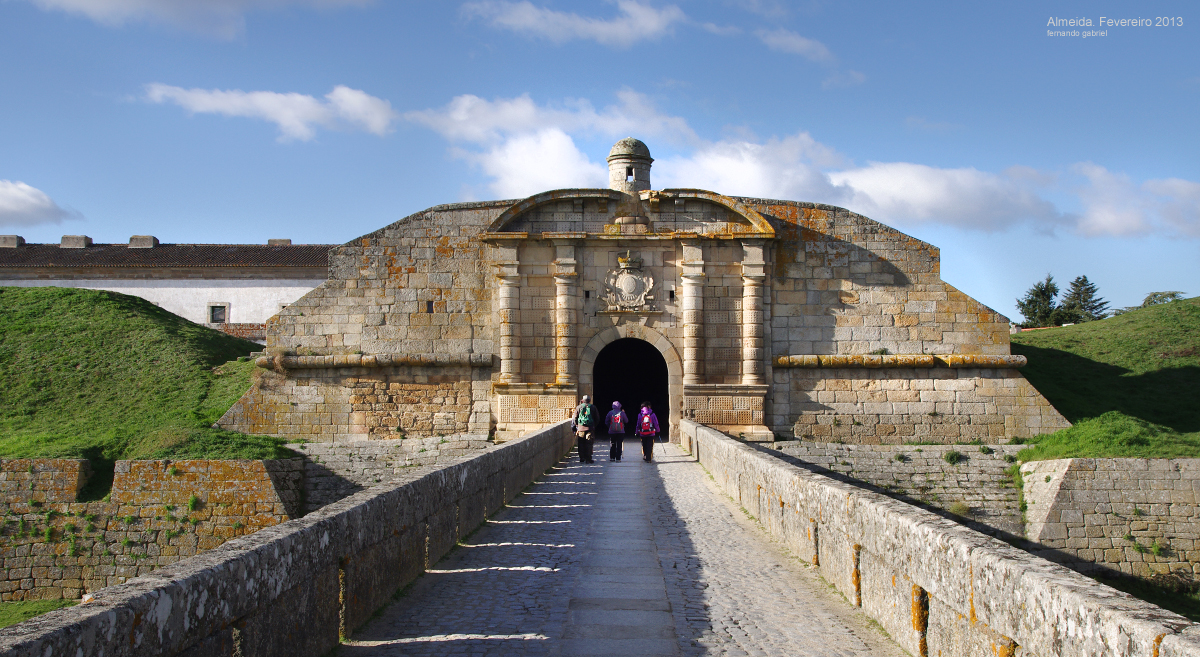
- Gates of the Fortified Village of Almeida

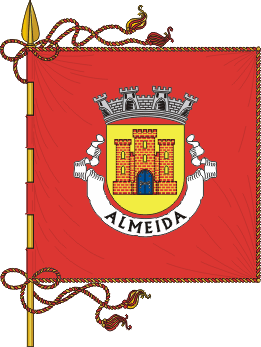
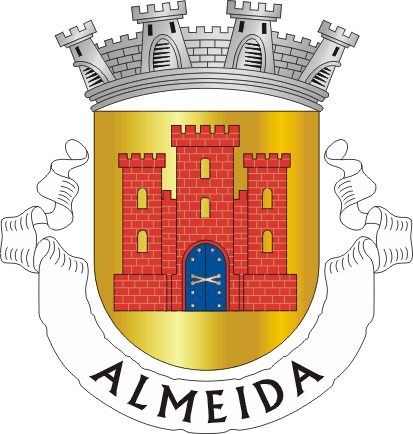
- Flag Coat of arms
- Interactive map of Almeida
- Location in Portugal
- Coordinates: 40°43′N 6°54′W
- Country: Portugal
- Region: Centro
- Intermunic. comm.: Beiras e Serra da Estrela
- District: Guarda
- Established: 1296
- Parishes: 16

Government
  - President: António José Monteiro Machado (PPD/PSD)

Area
  - Total: 517.98 km^{2} (199.99 sq mi)

Population (2011)
  - Total: 7,242
  - Density: 13.98/km^{2} (36.21/sq mi)
- Time zone: UTC+00:00 (WET)
  - Summer (DST): UTC+01:00 (WEST)
- Postal code: 6350 / 6355 Almeida
- Patron: Our Lady of the Snows
- Local holiday: July 2 (Battle of Côa)
- Website: www.cm-almeida.pt

Almeida (European Portuguese pronunciation: [alˈmɐjðɐ]) is a fortified village and a municipality in the sub-region of Beira Interior Norte and the District of Guarda, Portugal. The town proper has a population of 1,300 people (2011). The municipality population in 2011 was 7,242, in an area of 517.98 square kilometres (199.99 square miles). It is located in Riba-Côa river valley. The present Mayor is António Baptista Ribeiro, elected by the Social Democratic Party. The municipal holiday is July 2.

== Location ==
The village lies 7.2 kilometres (4.5 miles) west of the border with Spain and straddles the N332 road. The Rio Côa run northwards a short distance to the west of the village. The town's castle fortress was completed in 1641 and is located to the north of the village and is approached through the two tunnel gates and dry moat named the Portas de São Francisco.

== Twin town ==
- Mutzig, Bas-Rhin, France

== History ==
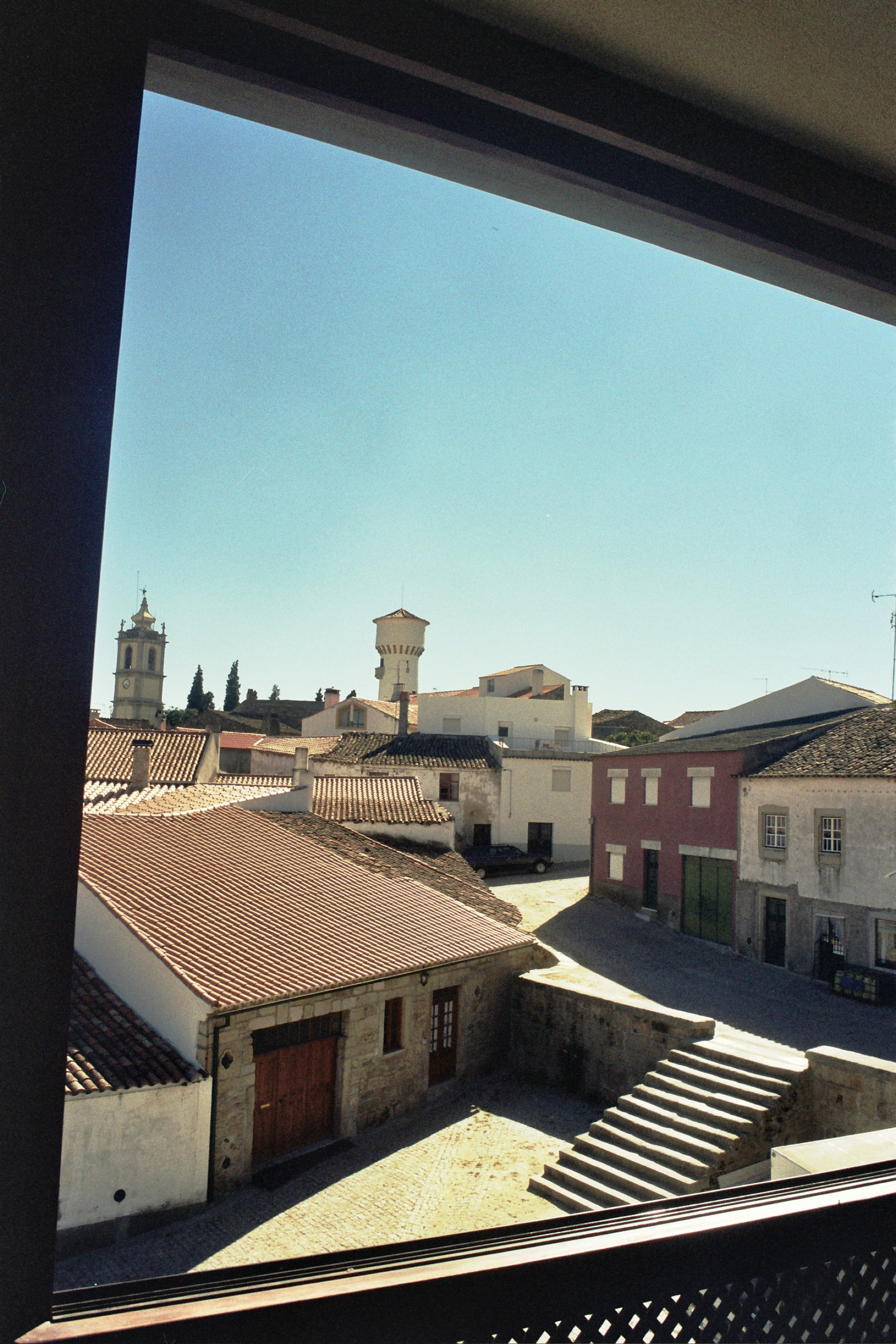
Almeida, Portugal

In and around the environment of Almeida, evidence of human occupation can be found dating back to the Bronze Age and Iron Age. Evidence has also been found of Roman occupation followed by the Suevi and the Visigoths.

The first fortifications constructed in the settlement were constructed by the Muslims who occupied the village until Christian reconquest of the Iberian Peninsula. It was during this time that the current name was first used, in the form of the Arabic المائدة al-Ma'ida ('the table'). This name refers to a legend that an ornate bejeweled table captured by Tariq ibn Ziyad was the dining table of King Solomon.

=== Sancho I, The Populator ===
The village of Almeida was captured from the Moors by the second king of Portugal, Sancho I in the 12th century because of its strategic position on the new country of Portugal's border with Spain. So important to the security of the country, Sancho had the village heavily fortified. The castle was refortified on three further occasions by King Dinis, King Manuel I and by King João VI. The present 12 pointed star fortification was constructed in 1641 to a Vaubanesque plan on which the French military engineer is believed to have personally worked, during the castle's final stages of completion.

=== Spanish occupation ===
During the Seven Years' War (1754 to 1763) which involved most of the great powers of Europe, Spain with the help of France launched an attack on Portugal due to its alliance with Great Britain. As a result of the invasion Almeida was captured by Spain in 1762.

=== Almeida Fortress ===
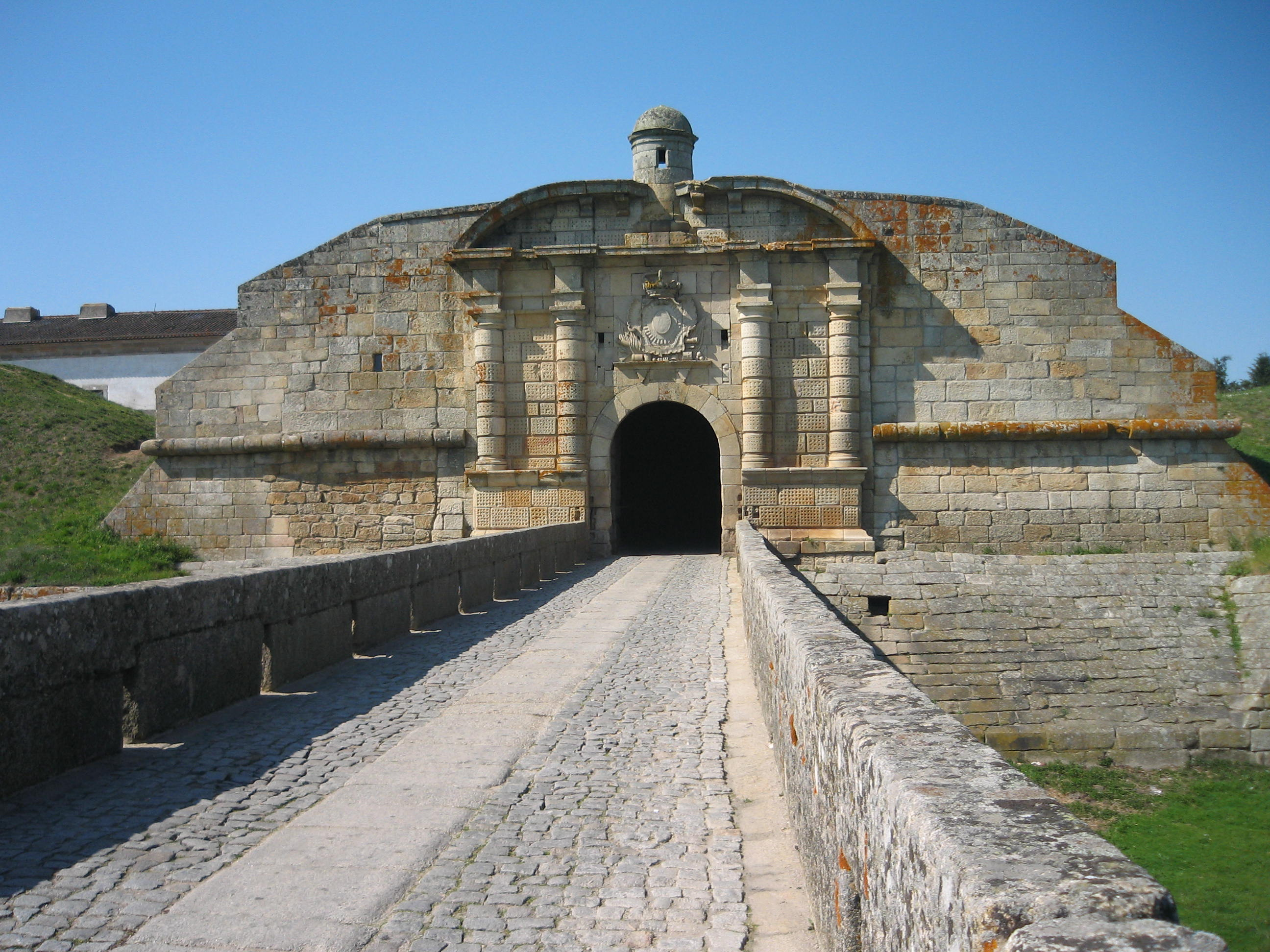
Gates of Saint Francis, Almeida Fortress

The fortress around the town guards an important cross-border road from Spain, and underwent several sieges. The siege of 1810, during the Peninsular War, ended spectacularly when a chance shell ignited the main gunpowder magazine, which exploded, killing 500 defenders and destroying most of the town.

== Classified Heritage ==
See main article: Label: Lista de património edificado em Almeida

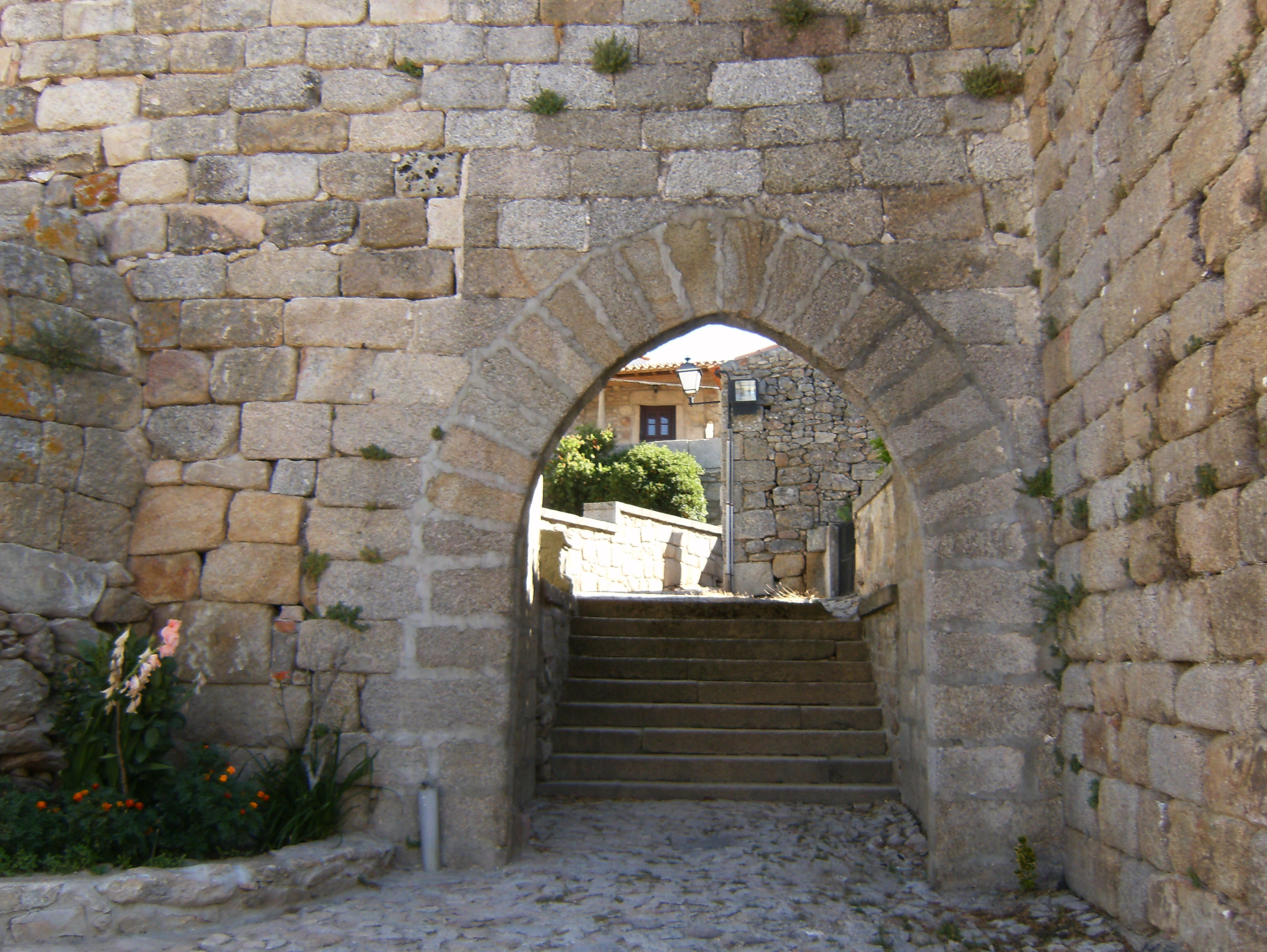
Village gate, in Castelo Bom

=== National monuments ===
- Walls of the Square of Almeida (National monument since February 3, 1928)
- Castle of Castelo Bom (National monument since 2 January 1946)
- Castle of Castelo Mendo (National monument since 2 January 1946)

=== Buildings of public interest ===
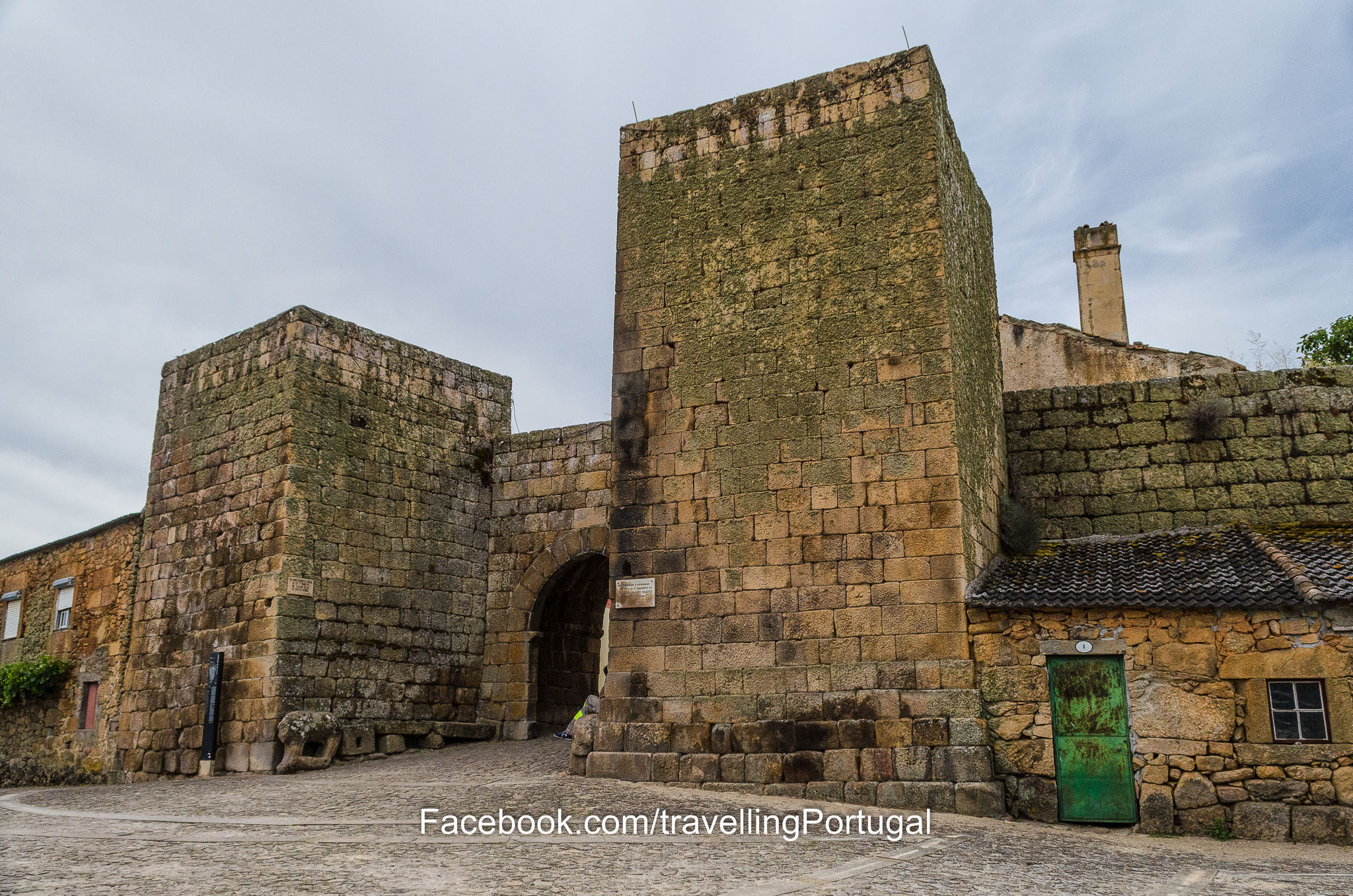
Medieval Village of Castelo Mendo

- Castelo Mendo Village (IIP since 25 June 1984)
- Pillory of Castelo Mendo (IIP since 11 October 1933)
- Pillory of Vale de Coelha (IIP since 11 October 1933)
- Church of Saint Michael (Malhada Sorda - IIP since 31 December 1997)
- Necropolis of graves excavated in the rock (Malpartida - IIP since 31 December 1997)
- Church of Our Lady da Annunciation (Leomil - IIP since 10 February 2014)
- Anta da Pedra de Anta (TL: Dolmen of the Rock of Dolmen) (Malhada Sorda - IIP since 8 October 2015)

=== Other monuments and museums ===
- Picadeiro D'el Rey (Almeida) _{(Loose Translation: King's Riding Arena)}
- Casamatas_{(tl: casemates)} / Historical-Military Museum of Almeida
- Quartel das Esquadras (Almeida) _{(tl: Barracks of the Police Stations)}
- Almeida Centre for the Study of Military Architecture (CEAMA)
- Malhada Sorda's Esnoga

See external links: Almeida, Portugal § External links

== Economy ==
The primary sector is the main source of wealth of the municipality of Almeida, similarly to the neighbouring municipalities of the interior. The agricultural and horticultural sector predominates as a complement to other family incomes, in which the smallholding stands out. Given its characteristics, combined with economic and social factors, it has low productivity levels.

Livestock comprises about 30 000 cattle and 10 000 sheep and goats.

The food, wood and marble and granite processing industries are the most representative, although in general this sector is characterised by low productivity and occupies only about 5% of the working population of the municipality.

The structure of the industrial sector has changed significantly, through the dynamisation of the Vilar Formoso industrial park, an infrastructure consisting of 31 lots.

The tertiary sector assumes some expression in the parishes of Almeida and Vilar Formoso: Almeida, due to the fact that the administrative services inherent to a county seat, some bank agencies, law and accountancy offices as well as some traditional commerce and small hotels are located there; Vilar Formoso, due to its dynamics as the main land border, presents a significant number of bank agencies, hotels and commercial establishments.

The services considered of social nature have also acquired some relevance in the two towns and in several villages, through the work developed by the social solidarity institutions there, in the areas of support and welcoming of the elderly and also of support to early childhood.

== Parishes ==
Administratively, the municipality is divided into 16 civil parishes (freguesias):

- Almeida
- Amoreira, Parada and Cabreira
- Azinhal, Peva and Valverde
- Castelo Bom _{(TL: Good Castle)}
- Castelo Mendo, Ade, Monte Perobolço and Mesquitela
- Freineda
- Freixo
- Junça and Naves
- Leomil, Mido, Senouras and Aldeia Nova _{(Aldeia Nova translates to New Village)}
- Malhada Sorda
- Malpartida and Vale de Coelha
- Miuzela and Porto de Ovelha
- Nave de Haver
- São Pedro de Rio Seco _{(TL: Saint Peter of the Dry River)}
- Vale da Mula _{(TL: Valley of the Mule)}
- Vilar Formoso

== Festivities and events ==
- Ade
1. Lamb Festival - 1st or 2nd Sunday of February
2. Festivity of Saint Barbara (biennial, August)
3. Festivity of St. John (27 December)
- Aldeia Nova
1. Festivity of Saint Mary Magdalene (22 June)
2. Festivity of Saint Barbara (movable in August)
- Almeida
1. Commemorations of the Siege of Almeida (August)
2. Festivity of Our Lady of the Snows (August)
3. Pilgrimage of the Lord of the Barge (Sunday of Pentecost)
4. Municipal Holiday(2 July)
- Amoreira
1. Festivity of Saint Bárbara (movable, August)
2. Festivity of Our Lady of Fátima (13 May)
- Azinhal
1. Festivity of St. Sebastian (August)
2. Traditional Festivity (Easter Monday)
- Cabreira
1. Festivity of Saint Mary Magdalene (22 July)
2. Festivity of Saint Barbara (August)
- Castelo Bom and Aldeia de S. Sebastião
1. St. Sebastian (Weekend closest to January 20. Annual)
2. Our Lady of Remedies (movable, August)
3. Saint Anthony (June)
4. Saint Barbara (August)
5. Our Lady of Fátima (13 May)
- Castelo Mendo and Paraizal
1. Our Lady of Fátima (13 May or closest Sunday)
2. Saint Anthony (August)
- Freineda
1. Saint Euphemia (16 September)
2. Bucho (Tripe) Festival (March)
- Freixo
1. Our Lady of Nativity (1st half of August)
2. Easter's Day Pilgrimage
3. Pilgrimage on Holy Sacrament Day
- Junça
1. Our Lady of the Monastery (15 August)
2. Saint Anthony (June)
3. St. Sebastian (May)
- Leomil and Ansul
1. Saint Anthony (2nd or 3rd week of August)
2. Our Lady of Annunciation (25 March - local holiday)
3. Our Lady of Conception (2nd or 3rd week of August)
- Malhada Sorda

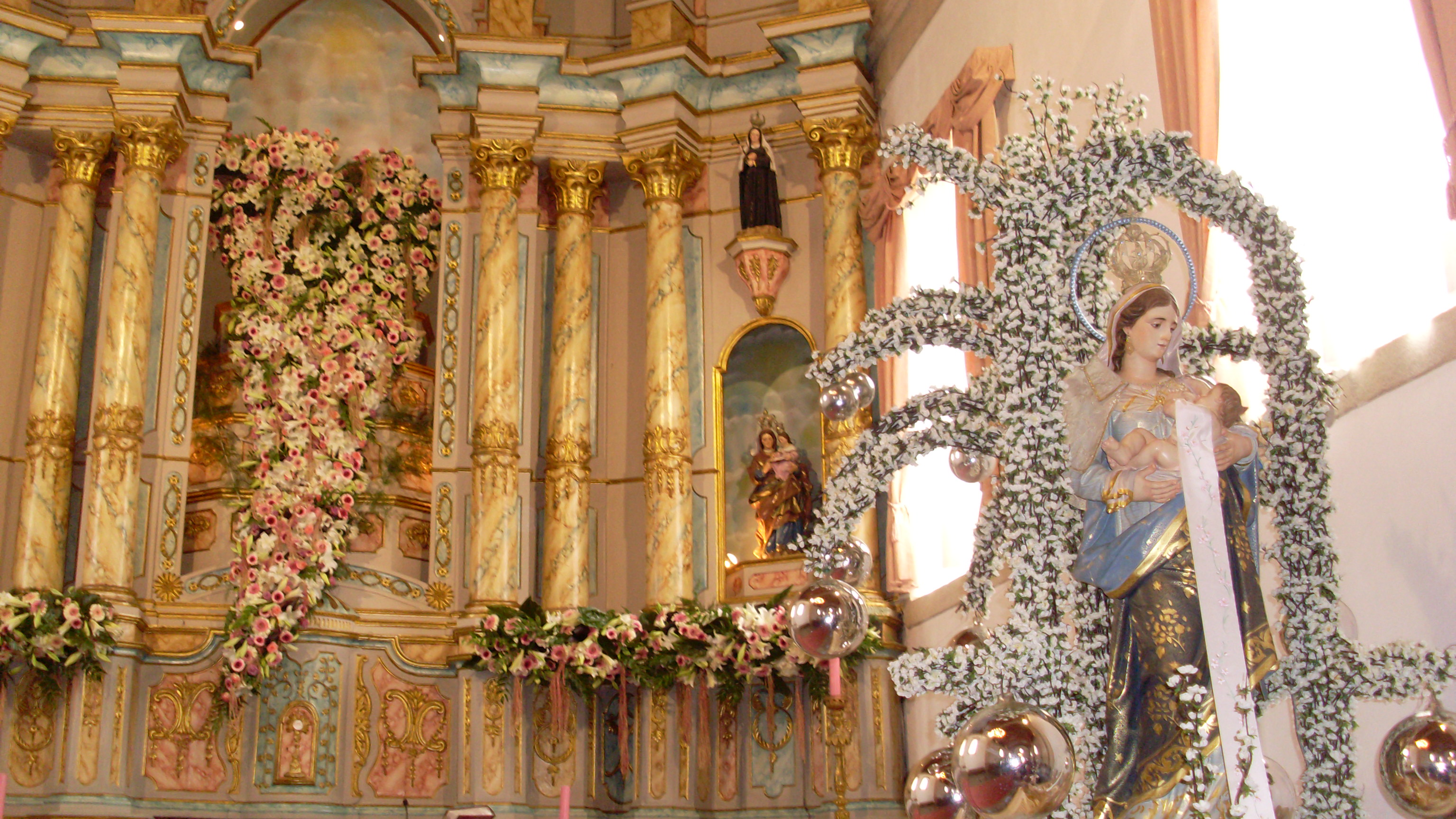
Altar and Image of Our Lady of Help

1. Pilgrimage – Our Lady of Help (5th to 9 September) - the biggest pilgrimage of Guarda's Diocese, which attracts pilgrims to the Sanctuary of Our Lady of Help all year round
  1. Sunday Eucharist in the Sanctuary of Our Lady of Help - every first Sunday of every month (with the exception of other festivities on that date)
  2. Festivity of the Assumption of Our Lady - 15 August
2. Festivities
  1. Saint Michael (last Monday of May)
  2. Saint Sebastian (Sunday after 20 January)
  3. Festivity of the Bachelors and Divine Holy Spirit (Pentecost)
  4. Festivity of the Lord (Day of Corpus Christi)
3. Ceremonies of the Holy Week
- Malpartida
1. Our Lady of the Snows (August)
2. Saint Anthony (August)
3. St. Sebastian (movable, August)
4. Saint Barbara (May)
- Mesquitela
1. St. Sebastian (20 January)
2. Our Lady of the Infirm (movable, August)
- Mido
1. St. Roque (16 August)
2. Saint Anthony (13 June - local holiday)
3. Our Lady of Fátima (October)
- Miuzela
1. St. Sebastian (movable, August)
2. Procession of the Steps (Corpus Christi)
- Monteperobolso
1. St. Brás (3 of February)
2. Saint Barbara (biennial, August)
3. Festival of the Emigrant (August)
4. Annual Festivity (Socializing lunch for the whole population)
5. St. Martin's Festivities (community's Magusto)
6. New Year's Eve (community supper)
- Nave de Haver and Poço Velho
1. Saint Anthony (13 June)
2. Holiest Sacrament (July)
3. Our Lady of Fátima (15 August)
4. Saint Barbara (4 December)
5. Immaculate Conception (8 December)
6. St. Bartholomew
- Naves
1. Saint Anthony (movable, August)
- Parada e Pailobo
1. Saint Anthony (August)
2. St. Sebastian (August)
3. Festivity of the Roscas (25th and 26 December)
- Peva e Aldeia Bela
1. Saint Mary Magdalene (22 June)
2. Holy Spirit (Day of Pentecost)
3. St. Sebastian (August)
- Porto of Ovelha e Jardo
1. Festivity of the Holiest Sacrament (1st Sunday of June)
2. Festivity of Saint Amaro (August)
- São Pedro de Rio Seco
1. Festivity of Our Lady of Good Success (penultimate weekend of August)
2. Festivity of St. Peter (Sunday after 29 June)
3. Festivity of St. Joseph (Sunday after 19 March)
4. Festivity of the Young Child (1st of Janeiro)
- Senouras
1. Saint Catherine (25 November)
2. Saint Luzia (13 December)
- Vale of Mula
1. Saint Anthony
2. Our Lady of Fátima (August)
3. Our Lady of Assumption (May)
4. Our Lady of Lourdes (2nd Sunday of February)
- Vale of Coelha
1. Our Lady of Póvoa (movable, biennial)
- Valverde
1. Our Lady of Grace (1st half of May)
2. Saint Anthony (biennial, 2nd half of August)
- Vilar Formoso
1. Immaculate Conception (8 December)
2. Festivity of Our Lady of Peace (15 August)

== Transportation ==
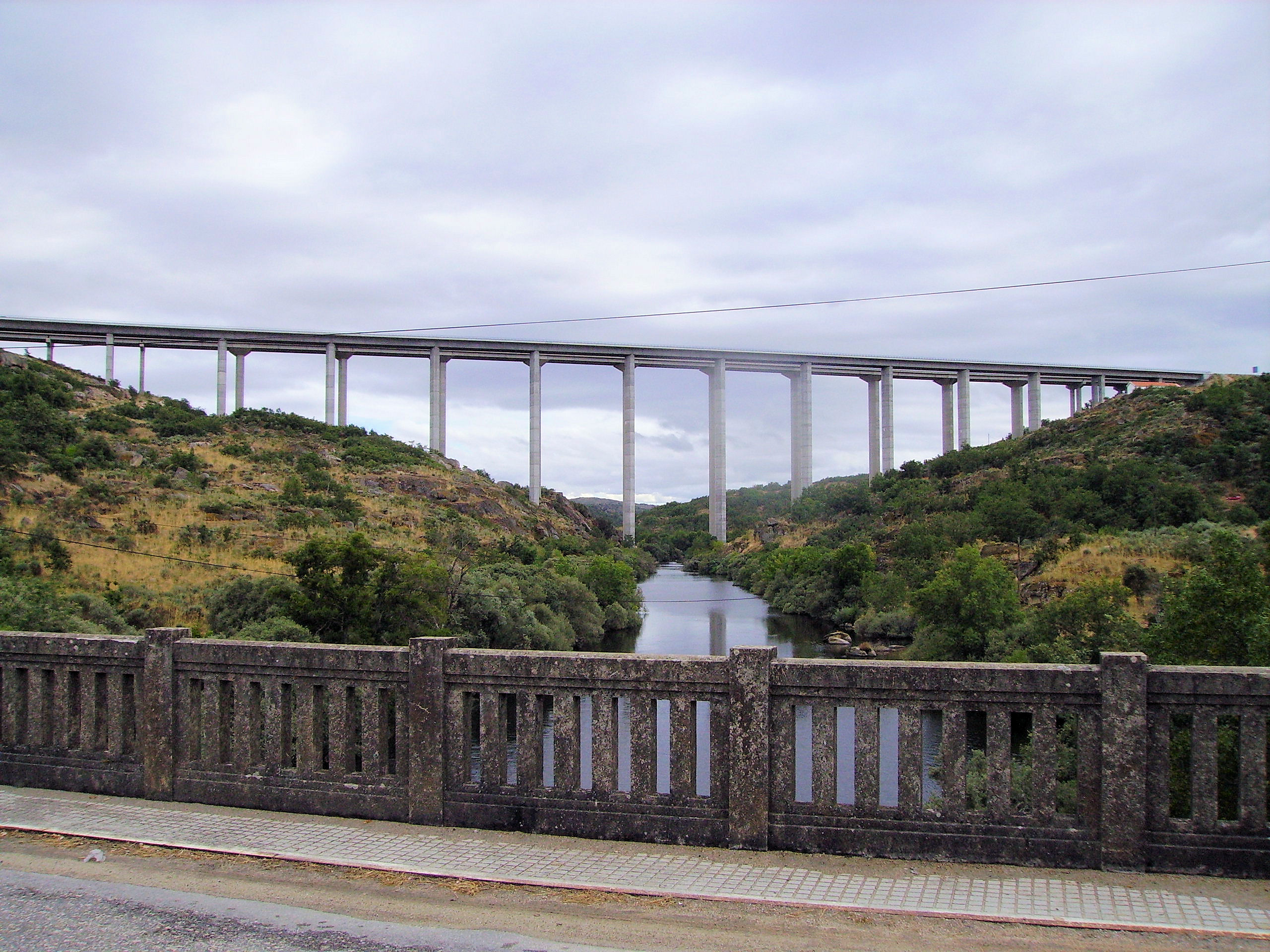
A25 - viaduct of Castelo Bom seen from EN16

The town is served by the A25 Motorway, the main motorway linking Portugal and Spain which, in the territory of the municipality of Almeida, is connected to the rest of the road network via two interchanges:

- Alto de Leomil: serves the western part of the municipality and the town of Almeida
- Vilar Formoso: serves the arraiana area (east) of the municipality and the town of Vilar Formoso

The municipality is also served by a considerable network of national roads:

- EN 16: Aveiro - Viseu - Guarda - Alto de Leomil - Castelo Mendo - Castelo Bom - Vilar Formoso
- EN 332: V. N. Foz Côa - Figueira de Castelo Rodrigo - Almeida - Vilar Formoso - Nave de Haver - Sabugal - Penamacor - Idanha-a-Nova
- EN 324: Pinhel - Valverde - Alto de Leomil - Parada - Sabugal
- EN 340: EN 324 - Almeida

In summary, the distance between Almeida and nearby towns:

	Dist.	Time	Dist. EN	Time EN	Route EN
Guarda	37 km	25 min	37 km	40 min	N324 + N16
Ciudad Rodrigo	42 km	30 min	42 km	40 min	N332 + N-620
Figueira de Castelo Rodrigo	---	---	22 km	20 min	N332
Pinhel	---	---	25 km	25 min	N340 + N324
Sabugal	---	---	49 km	50 min	N340 + N324
Covilhã	82 km	55 min	83 km	1h20 min	N340 + N324 + N16 + N18

Distance and time to other important points in the country

- Lisbon - 344 km; 3h 20 min;
- Porto - 230 km; 2h 15 min;
- Coimbra - 195 km; 2h 5 min;
- Castelo Branco - 130 km; 1h 20 min;
- Vila Real - 200 km; 2h;
- Évora - 320 km; 3h 20 min.

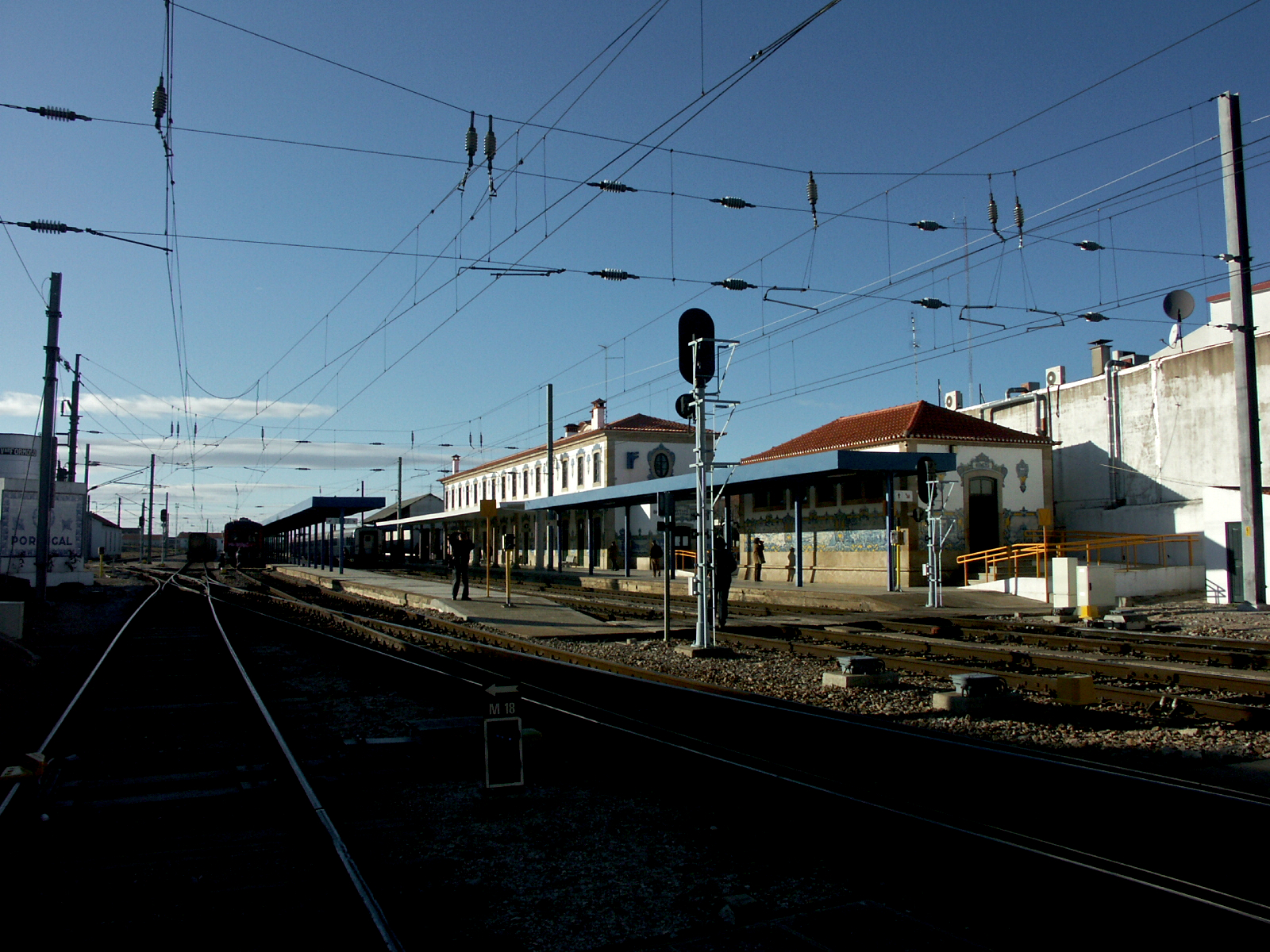
Beira Alta Line at Vilar Formoso Station

In terms of railways, the municipality of Almeida is crossed by the Beira Alta Line, being served by the Vilar Formoso station and the Aldeia stops (at the village of São Sebastião, parish of Castelo Bom), Freineda, Castelo Mendo (located near the village of Paraisal) and Miuzela. All the mentioned ones are stops of the Regional (CP) service that links the stations of Vilar Formoso and Guarda, allowing the transfer to the Intercidades(Intercities service) between the Guarda station and Lisbon, passing through cities like Coimbra and Santarém. Those who want to go north, namely to the cities of Porto, Aveiro, Braga, Guimarães or Viana do Castelo have to make an additional transfer at Pampilhosa or Coimbra-B stations.

Vilar Formoso railway station is also served by the international Sud-Express and Lusitânia Comboio Hotel services, hotel trains that connect to Paris and Madrid, stopping in Ciudad Rodrigo and Salamanca and in cities like Valladolid, Burgos, Vitoria-Gasteiz, San Sebastián and Hendaye, in the case of the former; and Ávila for the latter.

== Distinguished citizens ==
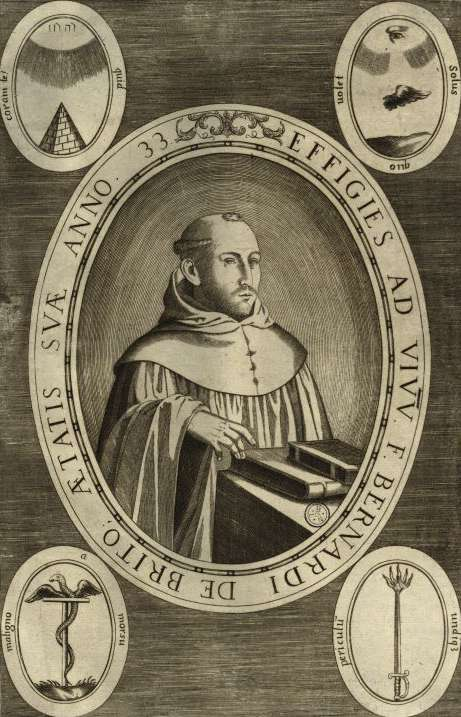
Friar Bernardo de Brito

- António Leitão (Castelo Bom, 1530 - ?) - plastic artist.
- Friar Bernardo de Brito (Almeida, 1569 - Almeida, 1617) - monk, historian and chief chronicler of the Kingdom of Portugal.
- António José de Abreu Castelo Branco (Almeida, 1752 - Lisbon, 1851) - military veteran.
- Paulino Joaquim Leitão (Almeida, 1779 - Lisbon, 1830) - poet and military.
- Major José Affonso Palla (Malhada Sorda, 1861 - Angola, 1915) - Republican military who participated in the coup of 5 October 1910; he was a deputy to the Constituent Assembly of 1911.
- António Ginestal Machado (Almeida, 1874 - Santarém, 1940) - Prime Minister of Portugal in 1923.
- Teófilo Carvalho dos Santos (Almeida, 1906 - Lisbon, 1986) - Lawyer. Opposer to the Estado Novo, founder of the Socialist Party and President of the Assembly of the Republic between 1978 and 1980.
- José Pinto Peixoto (Miuzela, 1922 - Lisbon, 1996) - eminent meteorologist, geophysicist and researcher.
- Eduardo Lourenço (São Pedro de Rio Seco, 1923 - Lisbon, 2020) - essayist and university professor. Camões Prize in 1996 and Pessoa Prize in 2011.
- Fernando Pinto Monteiro (Porto de Ovelha, 1942 - ...) - jurist and magistrate. Attorney-general of the Republic between 2006 and 2012.
- Major General Augusto Monteiro Valente (Coimbra, 1944 - Coimbra, 2012) - originally from Miuzela. Military, April Captain who occupied the border of Vilar Formoso during the Carnation Revolution.
- D. João Marcos (Monteperobolso, 1949 - ...) - Current Bishop of Beja.
- Jaime Silva (Almeida, 1954 - ...) - economist. Minister of Agriculture between 2005 and 2009.
- José Vilhena de Carvalho (1930–2013) - Lawyer and Historian. His books about Almeida are a reference in the history of the town.
- Pedro Zaz (born 1978 in Almeida) a Portuguese New-Media plastic artist
