= Kassiano Soares =

Brazilian footballer

Personal information
- Full name: Kassiano Soares Mendonca
- Date of birth: 24 April 1995 (age 31)
- Place of birth: Rio de Janeiro, Brazil
- Height: 1.86 m (6 ft 1 in)
- Position: Midfielder

Youth career
- Fluminense

Senior career*
Years	Team	Apps	(Gls)
2014–2018	Fluminense	0	(0)
2014	→ MYPA (loan)	6	(0)
2015–2016	→ ŠTK Šamorín (loan)	?	(3)
2017	→ Inter de Lages (loan)	0	(0)
2018–2019	Qormi	13	(0)
2020	Ranong United	4	(0)
2021	Cape Town Spurs	12	(0)
2021–2022	Jomo Cosmos		
2022	Canedo	2	(0)
2024	1. FCA Darmstadt	13	(1)
2025	Vasco da Gama Acre	0	(0)
- * Club domestic league appearances and goals

Kassiano Soares Mendonca (born 24 April 1995) is a Brazilian professional footballer who plays as a midfielder.

== Career ==
Before the 2014 season, Soares was sent on loan to Finnish side MYPA from Fluminense in Brazil, where he made 10 appearances and scored 0 goals and suffered a thigh injury. On 12 February 2014, he debuted for MYPA during a 3–0 win over KuPs. After that, Soares was sent on loan to Slovak third division club FC ŠTK 1914 Šamorín.

In 2018, he signed for Qormi in the Maltese top flight, where he claimed the football was "very tactical".

Before the 2020 season, Soares signed for Thai second division team Ranong United.

Before the second half of 2020–21, he signed for Cape Town Spurs in the South African second division.

== Career statistics ==
As of 10 May 2021

Appearances and goals by club, season and competition
Club	Season	League			Cup		Total	
Club	Season	Division	Apps	Goals	Apps	Goals	Apps	Goals
MYPA	2014	Veikkausliiga	6	0	3|0		9	0
Inter de Lages	2017	Campeonato Catarinense	0	0	-|-		0	0
Qormi	2018-19	Maltese Premier League	13	0	-|-		13	0
Cape Town Spurs	2020–21	National First Division	10	0	0|0		10	0
