= Malhada Sorda =

- Civil parish
- Location in Portugal
- Coordinates: 40.53511710°N 6.91340446°W
- Country: Portugal
- Region: Centro
- Intermunic. comm.: Beiras e Serra da Estrela
- District: Guarda
- Municipality: Almeida

Area
  - Total: 45.77 km^{2} (17.67 sq mi)

Population (2011)
  - Total: 334
  - Density: 7.3/km^{2} (19/sq mi)
- Time zone: UTC+00:00 (WET)
  - Summer (DST): UTC+01:00 (WEST)
- Postal code: 6355-080

Malhada Sorda is a town and civil parish in the municipality of Almeida, Portugal. The population in 2011 was 334, in an area of 45.77 km^{2}.

== Population ==
Population of the Parish of Malhada Sorda
1864	1878	1890	1900	1911	1920	1930	1940	1950	1960	1970	1981	1991	2001	2011
1 170	1 167	1 249	1 255	1 317	1 268	1 114	1 315	1 336	1 289	696	498	446	364	334

== Patrimony ==
- Parish Church of Saint Michael of Malhada Sorda and Belfry
- Anta da Pedra de Anta
- Sepulturas escavadas na rocha
- Sanctuary of Our Lady of Ajuda and Convent of the Barefooted Augustinians
- Traditional pottery kiln
- Alminhas da Malhada Sorda (Shrines)
- Synagogue of Malhada Sorda, with Sun clock
- Chapels of Saint Sebastian, Saint Anthony and of the Holy Christ
- Museum Padre José Pinto
- Jewry

== Festivities and Pilgrimages ==
- Pilgrimage – Festivities in Honor of Our Lady of Ajuda (September 5 to September 9) - the largest Pilgrimage of the Diocese of Guarda, which attracts pilgrims to the Sanctuary all year round
- Festivities
  - Saint Michael (last Monday of May)
  - Saint Sebastian (Sunday after the January 20)
  - Festivities of the Singles and of the Divine Holy Spirit (Pentecost)
  - Festivities of the Lord (Corpus Christi)
- Ceremonies of the Holy Week

== Fairs ==
- Every third weekend of the month
- Annual fair - September 7
