= António Ginestal Machado =

Portuguese politician ()

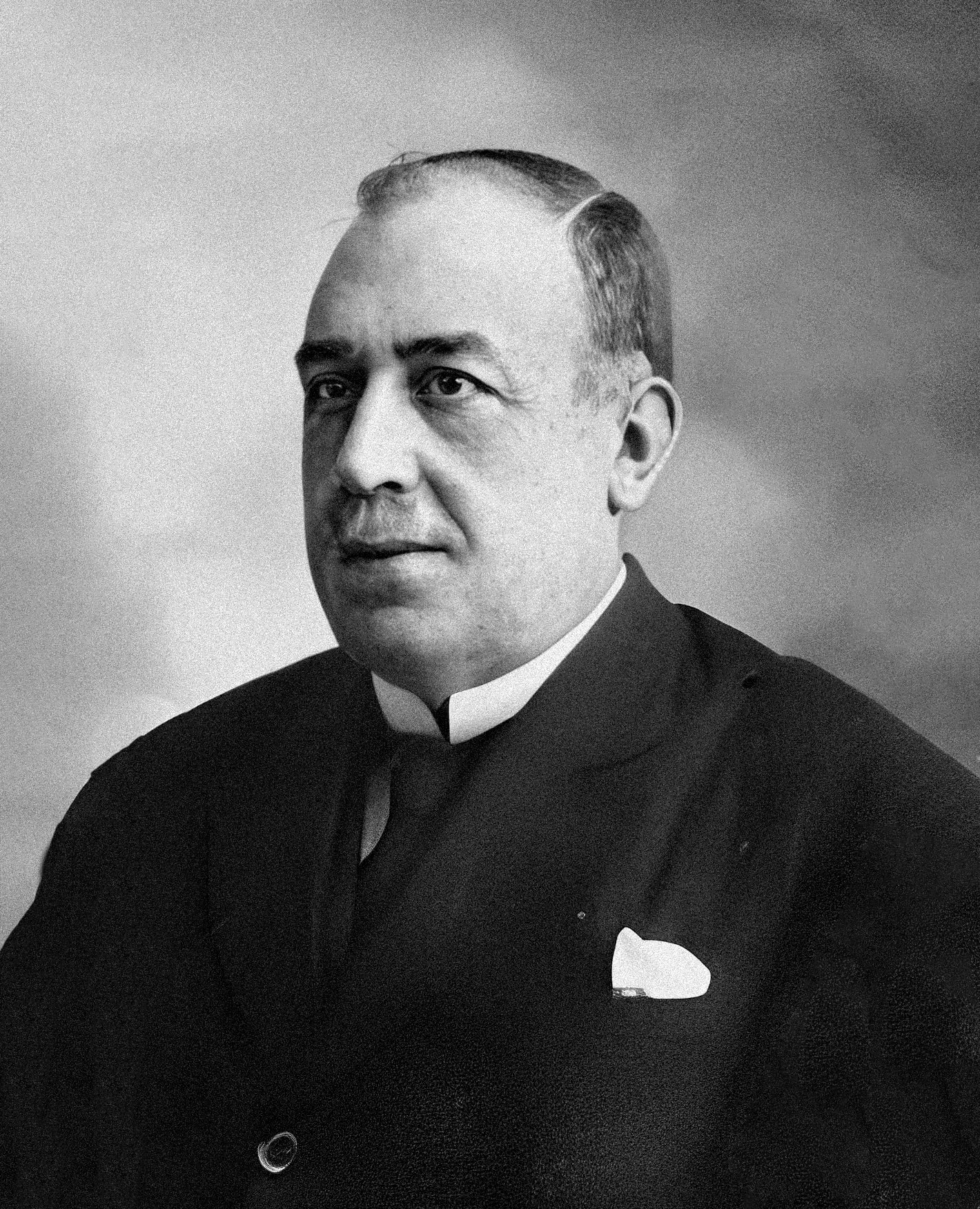

Prime Minister of Portugal
- In office 15 November 1923 – 17 December 1923
- President: Manuel Teixeira Gomes
- Preceded by: António Maria da Silva
- Succeeded by: Álvaro de Castro

Personal details
- Born: 3 May 1873 Almeida, Portugal
- Died: 28 June 1940 (aged 67) Santarém, Portugal
- Party: Republican Union, later Republican Liberal

António Ginestal Machado (European Portuguese: [ɐ̃ˈtɔni.u ʒinɨʃˈtal mɐˈʃaðu, ɐ̃ˈtɔnju -]; 3 May 1873 – 28 June 1940) was a Portuguese politician.

Born in Almeida, he graduated in Law at the University of Coimbra and became a high-school teacher. A member of the moderate Republican Union, he was one of the promoters of its fusion with the Evolutionist Party which originated the Republican Liberal Party. He was President of the Ministry (Prime Minister) from 15 November to 17 December 1923, in a minority government. He resigned due to the opposition of President Manuel Teixeira Gomes of dissolving the parliament, after an insurrection attempt. He was also previously Minister of Public Instruction from May to October 1921 in the cabinet of Tomé de Barros Queirós. He died in Santarém.

Political offices
Preceded by António Maria da Silva	Prime Minister of Portugal (President of the Ministry); 1923	Succeeded by Álvaro de Castro
