= Alexander Cañedo =

Mexican-American painter (1902–1978)

- Born: Alejandro de Cañedo; 26 December 1902; Mexico City, Mexico
- Died: 1 February 1978 (aged 75); West Hollywood, California, U.S.
- Education: École des Beaux-Arts
- Occupation: Artist

Alexander Cañedo (December 26, 1902 – February 1, 1978) was a Mexican-American artist who was part of the surrealism and magic realism art movements of the mid-20th century.

== Biography ==
Cañedo was born in Mexico City as Alejandro de Cañedo; his father was a Mexican government official and his mother was from the United States. In 1918, when Cañedo was 15, his parents sent him to École nationale supérieure des Beaux-Arts in Paris where he studied under the sculptor Jean Magrou. In 1923, Cañedo traveled to Rome where he continued his art studies. In 1927, Cañedo briefly returned to Mexico. During that trip, the Mexican Government appointed him attaché to the Mexican Embassy in Rome.

In 1928, Cañedo held his first art exhibition with the Circolo Artistico in Rome, a collection of pencil drawings. More exhibitions followed in other cities in Europe. That same year, he traveled to the New York City where he exhibited widely. At this point, he began signing his work with just his last name; eventually, he also Anglicized his first name as "Alexander" and dropped the "de".

Cañedo was commissioned in 1929 to illustrate the amatory novel Orientale: The Adventure of Therese Beauchamps by the French author Francis de Miomandre. The highly stylized Art Deco results were so successful that he retained Cañedo the following year to illustrate his next novel, The Love Life of Venus.

In 1932, Cañedo was invited to have a solo show of his pencil drawings at Walter P. Chrysler, Junior's newly opened Cheshire Gallery, located in the Chrysler Building. He also had a solo exhibition at the Argent Galleries, and participated in shows of the Art Students League of New York, of which he was an active member.

By the mid-1930s, Cañedo began exhibiting watercolors. These were shown at solo exhibitions at the Arthur U. Newton Galleries. He expanded to work in oil paint and in the early 1940s, such work was exhibited at the Arthur U. Newton Galleries and the Schneider-Gabriel Galleries of New York. Beginning in 1947 and over the next decade, he produced many illustrations for the covers of science fiction magazines such as Astounding.

Traveling west, Cañedo held a solo show at Gump's Gallery in San Francisco in 1949, the first of many exhibitions at Gump's. That year, he also exhibited at the first annual Art League of California faculty show. In 1950, Walter Foster published an art instruction book titled How Cañedo Draws the Figure; it remained in print for five years.

Cañedo permanently relocated to California, dividing his time between San Francisco and Los Angeles, with frequent painting trips to the Monterey area. His work tended to be formally similar, with nude figures set in improbable, alien or abstracted landscapes, or featured natural objects such as seashells floating in such settings. During this time, Cañedo also produced many overtly homoerotic artworks for private collectors which were too suggestive to be exhibited in galleries.

His work remained in demand throughout the 1960s, with solo exhibitions at the James Pendleton Gallery, Galleria Gianni, Raymond & Raymond Gallery and the Arcade Gallery in the Beverly Hills Hotel. His works are included in the permanent collection of the Leslie Lohman Gay Art Foundation.

Cañedo died in West Hollywood, California on February 1, 1978.
