= Pedro Zaz =

Portuguese New-Media artist and VJ

- Known for: Fulldome and video mapping

Pedro Zaz (born February 7, 1978) is a Portuguese New-Media artist and VJ working with fulldome / immersive cinema, video projection mapping, television, and audio-visual performance.

Zaz was born in Almeida, Portugal, and is co-founder of the international video artist group United VJs. “United VJs” creatively integrates the digital arts employing Video Projection Mapping, architecture, optical illusions, Fulldome Projection (digital planetariums), software programming, sound and video art. The international crew originates from São Paulo, with partners across South America, US and Europe, and has performed all over the world.

The artist also co-founded the education platform VJ University, which provides specific art & technology training for VJs and other visual artists around the world.

== Fulldome / Immersive Cinema ==
Zaz is director and one of the principle organizers of the Expanded Cinema festival Fulldome UK. In the field of fulldome, he also works as a software mentor and systems integrator for VJing in digital planetariums, and has co-created the Blendy Dome VJ and the Blendy 360 CAM software used for content creation and VJing in dome environments.
