= Vilar Formoso Fronteira da Paz =

Refugee museum in Portugal

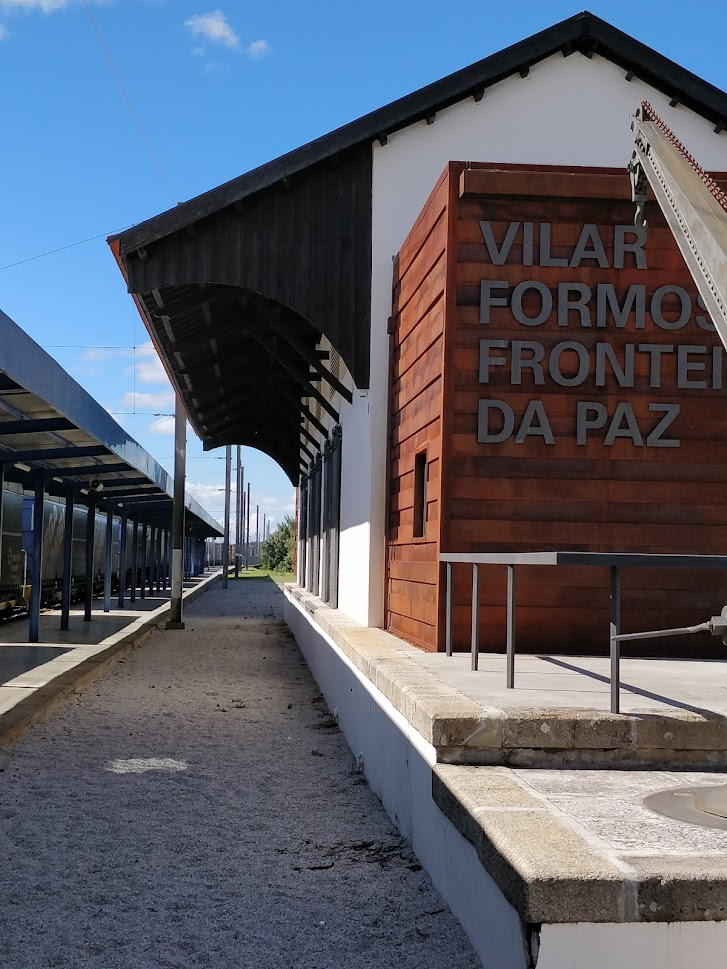
- Established: 26 August 2017
- Location: Vilar Formoso, Portugal
- Coordinates: 40.60634°N 6.82901°W
- Architect: Luísa Pacheco Marques,
- Historian: Margarida de Magalhães Ramalho
- Owner: Municipality of Almeida

The Vilar Formoso Fronteira da Paz (Frontier of Peace) memorial is a museum devoted to the role played by the Portuguese border town of Vilar Formoso in the reception of Jewish refugees and others from France and elsewhere who were escaping Nazi persecution in World War II.

== History ==
Seeking to escape from advancing German troops, many Jews, from France and elsewhere, made their way to Bordeaux in the hope of obtaining visas to enter Portugal. The Portuguese consul-general, Aristides de Sousa Mendes, ignored instructions from António de Oliveira Salazar, leader of Portugal's authoritarian Estado Novo regime, which remained neutral during the war but had no desire to upset the Germans, and continued to issue thousands of visas in Bordeaux, moving to Bayonne after Bordeaux was bombed. With these visas, the fleeing Jews and others, such as soldiers or airmen of the Allies trying to rejoin their units, made their way by train or car through Spain to Portugal, with the great majority eventually reaching the Portuguese border at Vilar Formoso.

== Memorial and museum ==
The memorial to the work of Sousa Mendes and the role of the people of Portugal in receiving the refugees takes the form of a museum built into two former warehouses at the Vilar Formoso railway station, which is of itself of considerable interest because of its azulejo tile decorations. It was officially opened on 26 August 2017 by the Portuguese president Marcelo Rebelo de Sousa. The exhibition has six sections, or cores, called as follows:

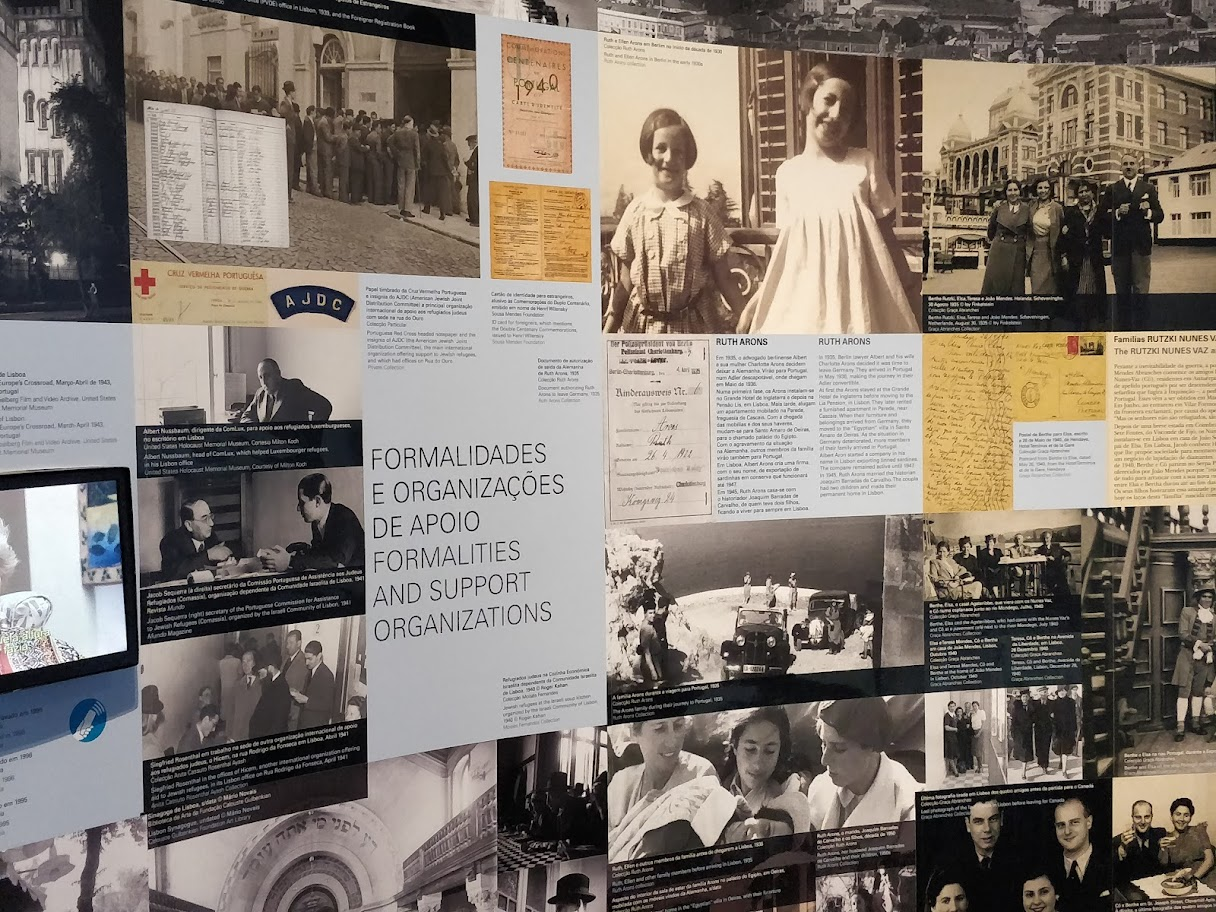
Internal view of the museum

- People like us
- The Beginning of the Nightmare
- The Journey
- Vilar Formoso / Frontier of Peace
- In Portuguese Lands
- The Departure

== The Display ==
=== People like us ===
This first section presents the experience of those who were "people like us" and who saw their lives turned upside down, with the rise to power of Adolf Hitler, in Germany in 1933.

=== The Beginning of the Nightmare ===
The exhibition presents, in a chronological sequence from 1933 to 1940, the most important events that forced thousands of people to flee into the unknown as the result of the persecution of Jews, the Roma, Jehovah’s Witnesses and others. The shape of the exhibition space is symbolically related to the Star of David.

=== The Journey ===
This section aims to convey the harsh conditions of the trip that the refugees made; the queues outside consulates; the lack of accommodation even if people had money; and shortages of food and transportation. The role of Aristides de Sousa Mendes is considered here.

=== Vilar Formoso / Frontier of Peace ===
This section shows the arrival of refugees by car and train, mainly in the last two weeks of June 1940. It discusses the assistance provided by the people of the town. Testimonies by refugees about the friendliness of the people of Vilar Formoso are provided.

=== In Portuguese lands ===
With the Portuguese capital Lisbon being overcrowded, the majority of refugees were sent to other cities, such as Porto, Coimbra and Figueira da Foz. Many ended up on the Portuguese Riviera near Lisbon in places such as Estoril and Cascais or further up the Atlantic coast at Ericeira. Others were sent to spa towns such as Caldas da Rainha. The advantages of all of these locations was that they had hotels available.

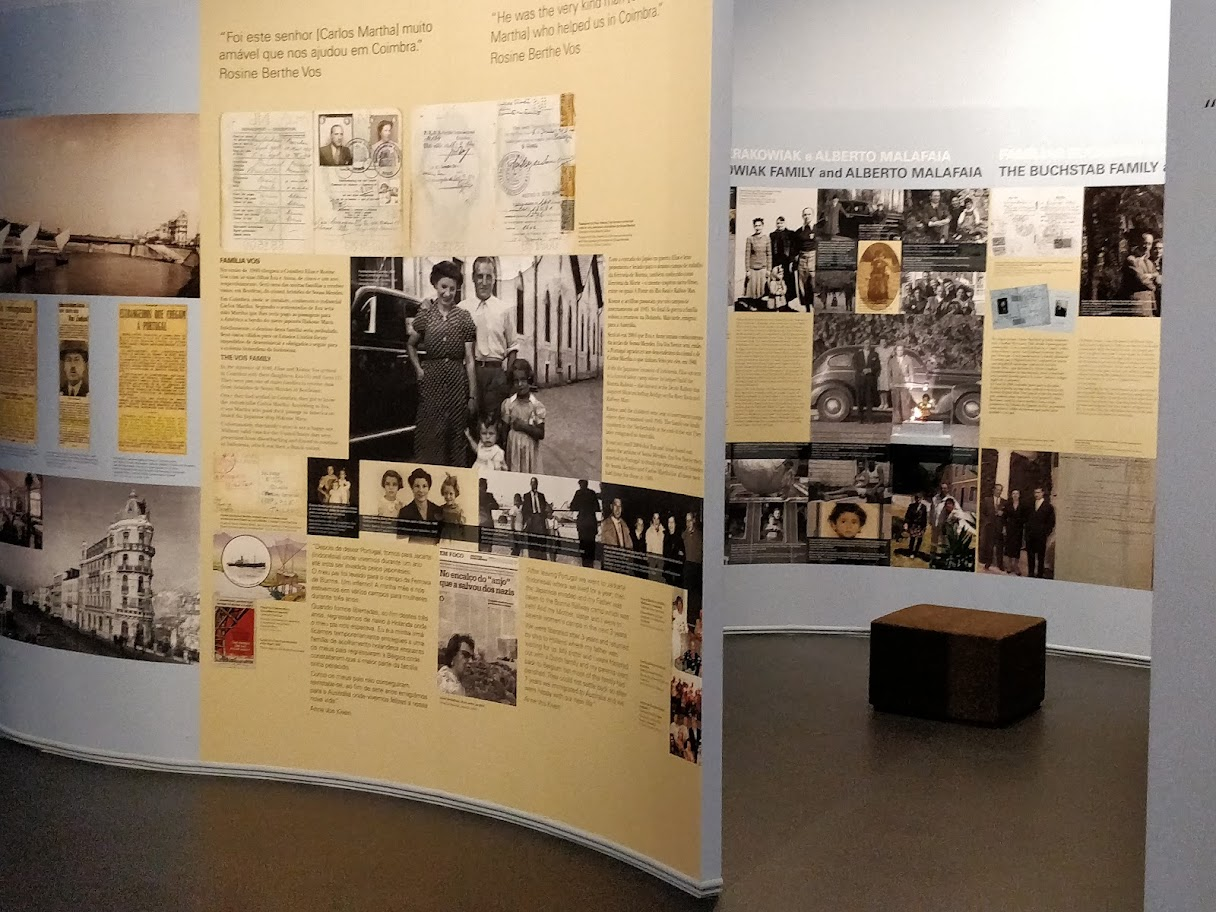
Internal view of the museum

=== The Departure ===
Few refugees intended to stay in Portugal, with most hoping to make it to the United States or South America. The exhibition describes the efforts to obtain visas and tickets.

== The Refugees ==
Among the refugees who were in Portugal during World War II and are believed to have passed through Vilar Formoso were:

- Menachem Mendel Schneerson
- Arthur Koestler
- Alfred Döblin
- Heinrich Mann
- Erika Mann
- Antoine de Saint-Exupéry
- Peggy Guggenheim
