= Vale (Santa Maria da Feira) =

Former civil parish in Portugal

- Civil parish
- Location in Portugal
- Coordinates: 40.982°N 8.440°W
- Country: Portugal
- Region: Norte
- Metropolitan area: Porto
- District: Aveiro
- Municipality: Santa Maria da Feira
- Disbanded: 2013

Area
  - Total: 9.01 km^{2} (3.48 sq mi)

Population (2001)
  - Total: 2,138
  - Density: 237/km^{2} (615/sq mi)
- Time zone: UTC+00:00 (WET)
  - Summer (DST): UTC+01:00 (WEST)

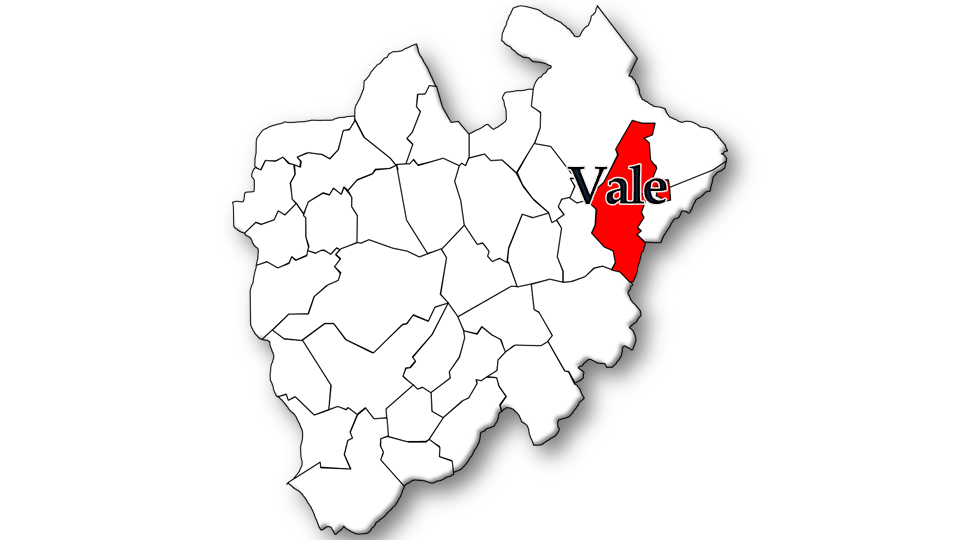
Location in Santa Maria da Feira.

Vale (Portuguese meaning "valley") is a former civil parish in the municipality of Santa Maria da Feira, Portugal. In 2013, the parish merged into the new parish Canedo, Vale e Vila Maior. It has a population of 2,138 inhabitants and a total area of 9.01 km^{2}.
