= Central Region, Portugal =

Central Region Região do Centro
- NUTS II Region
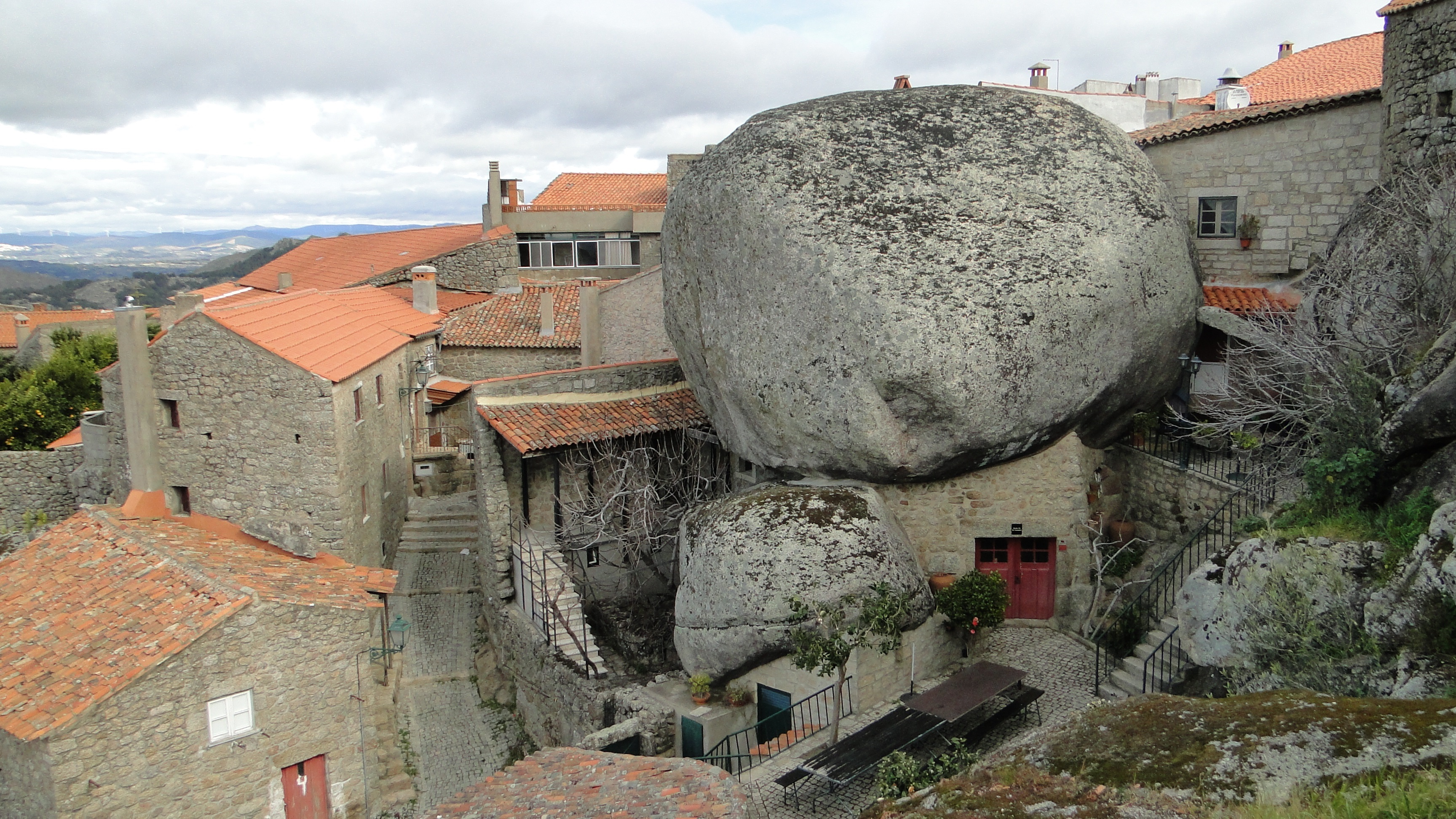
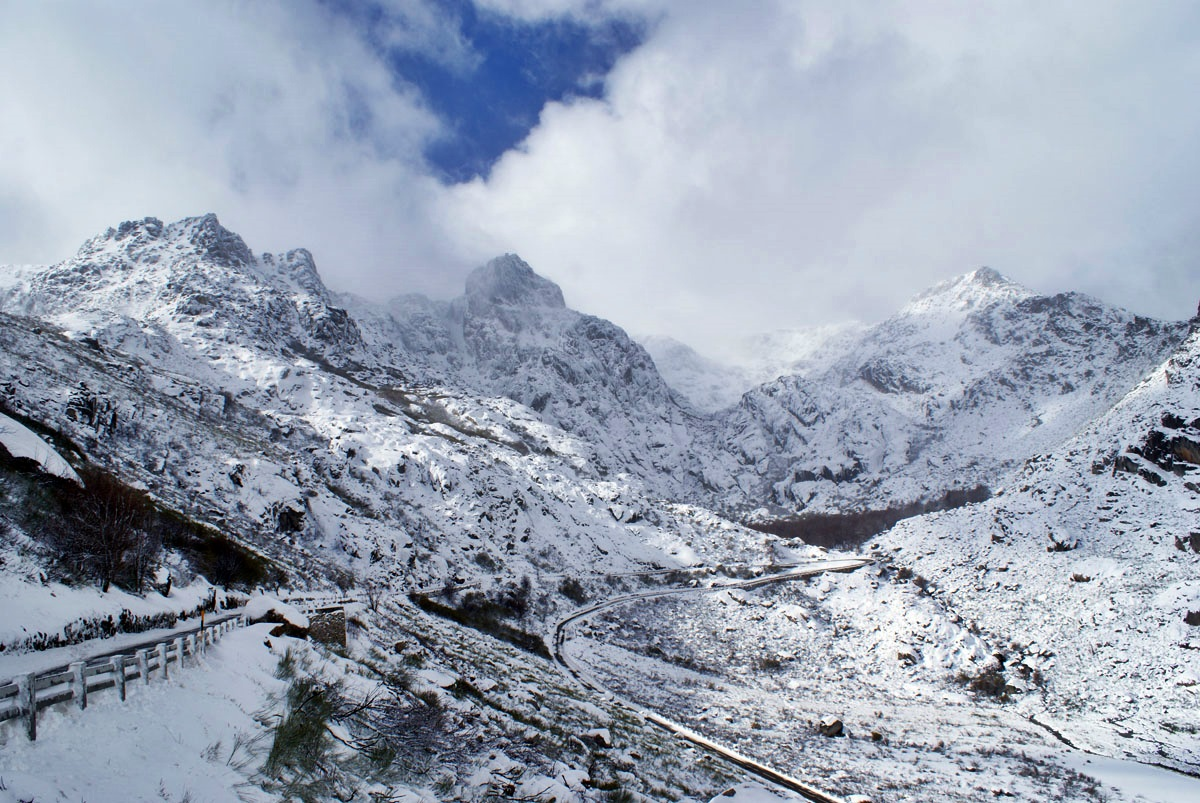
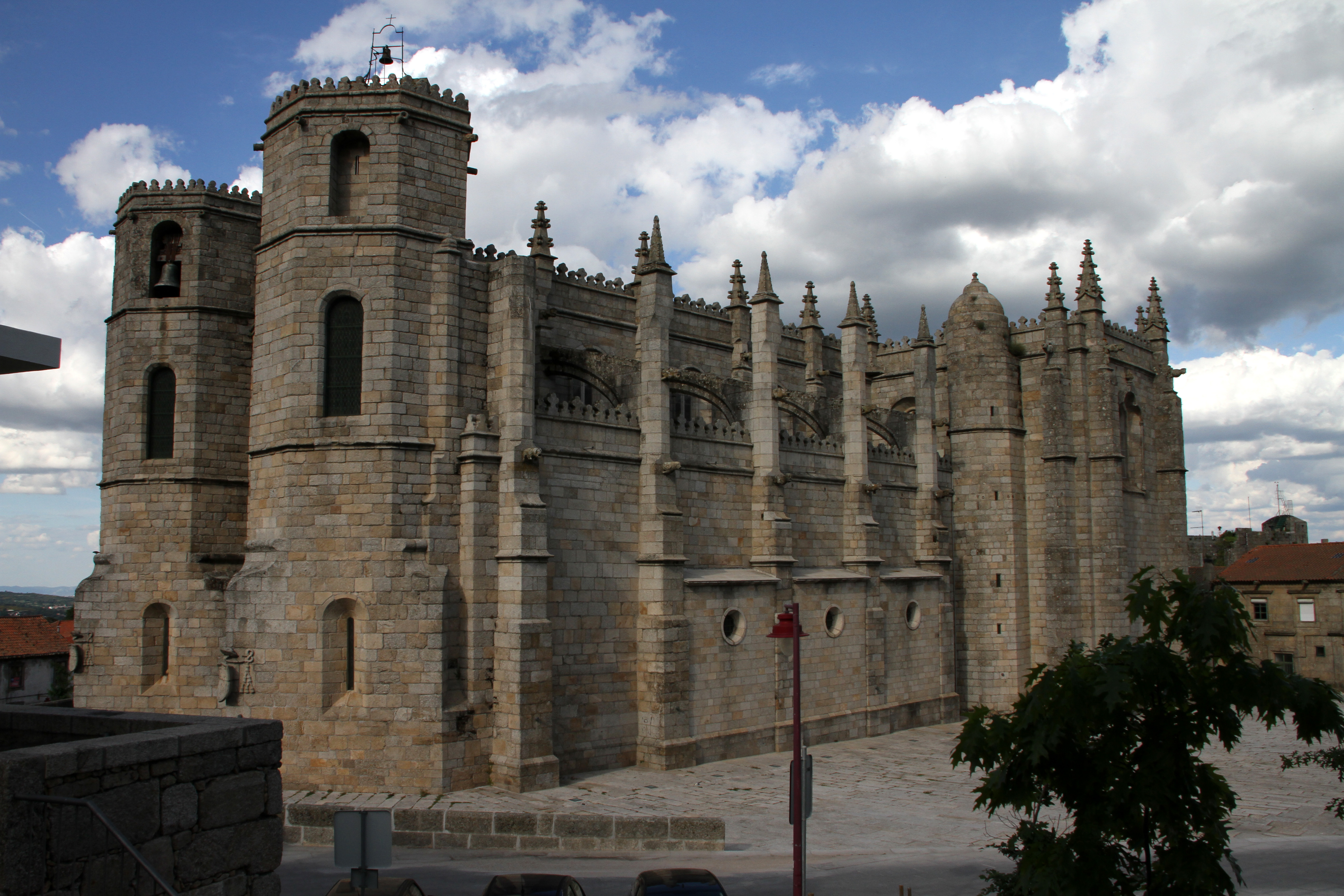
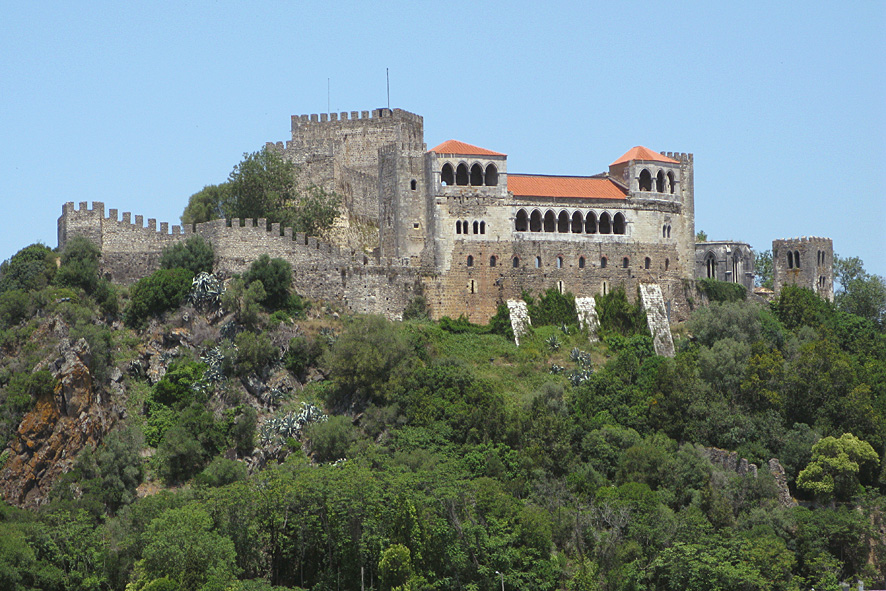
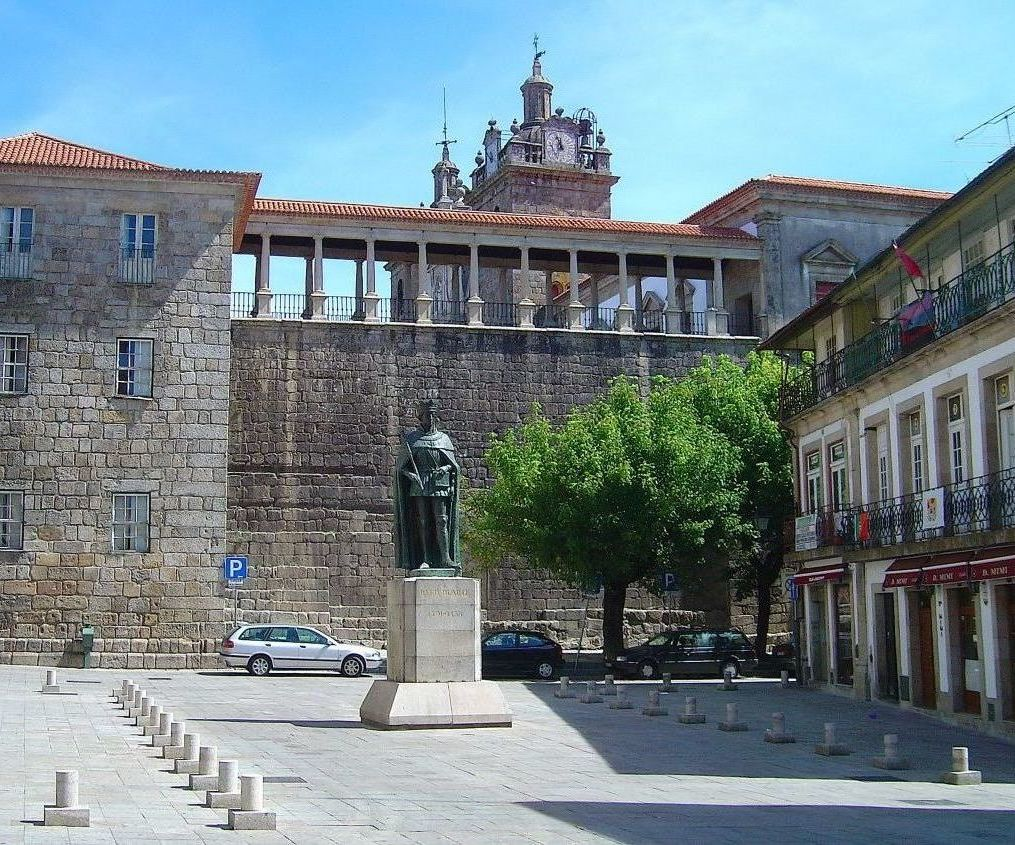
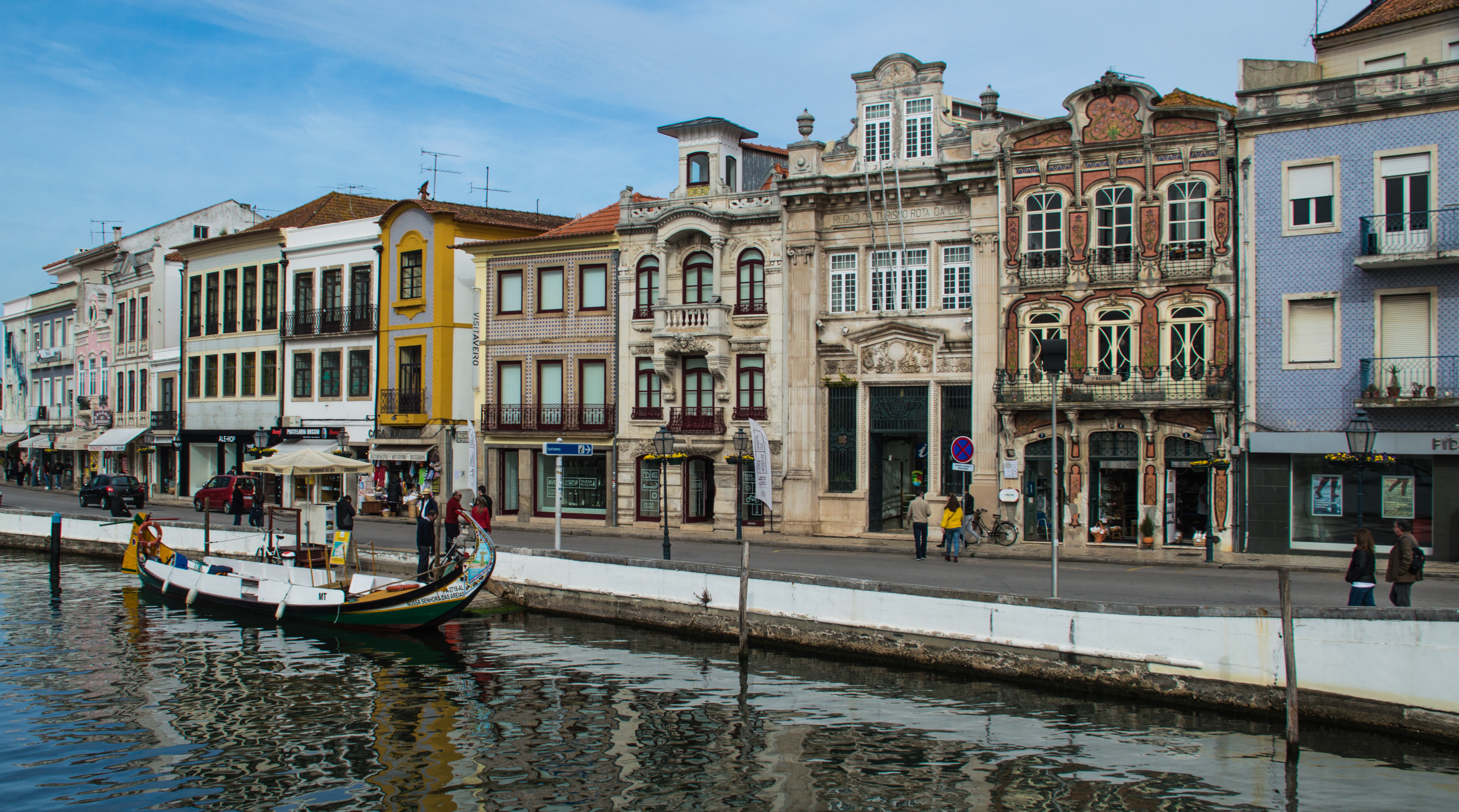
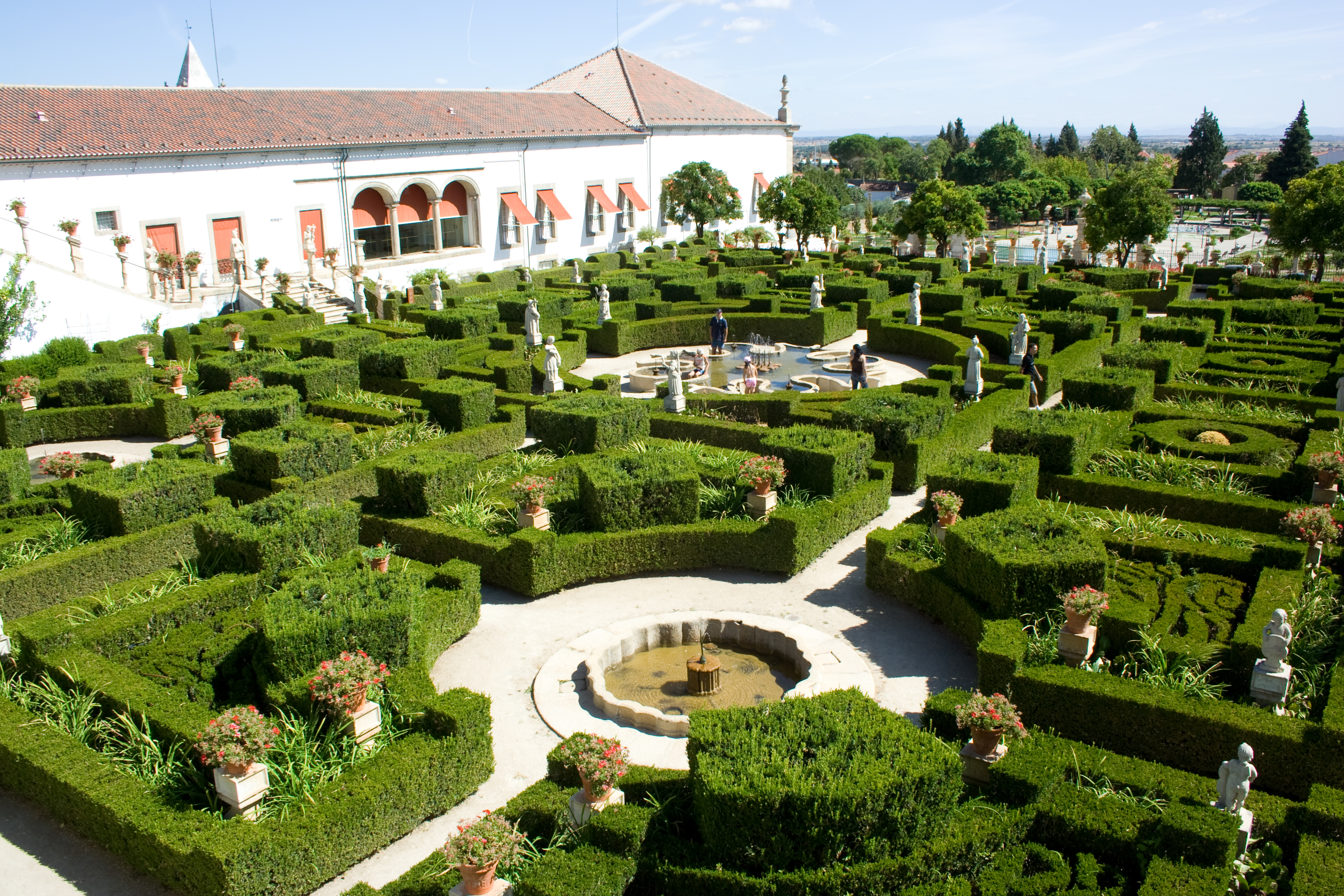
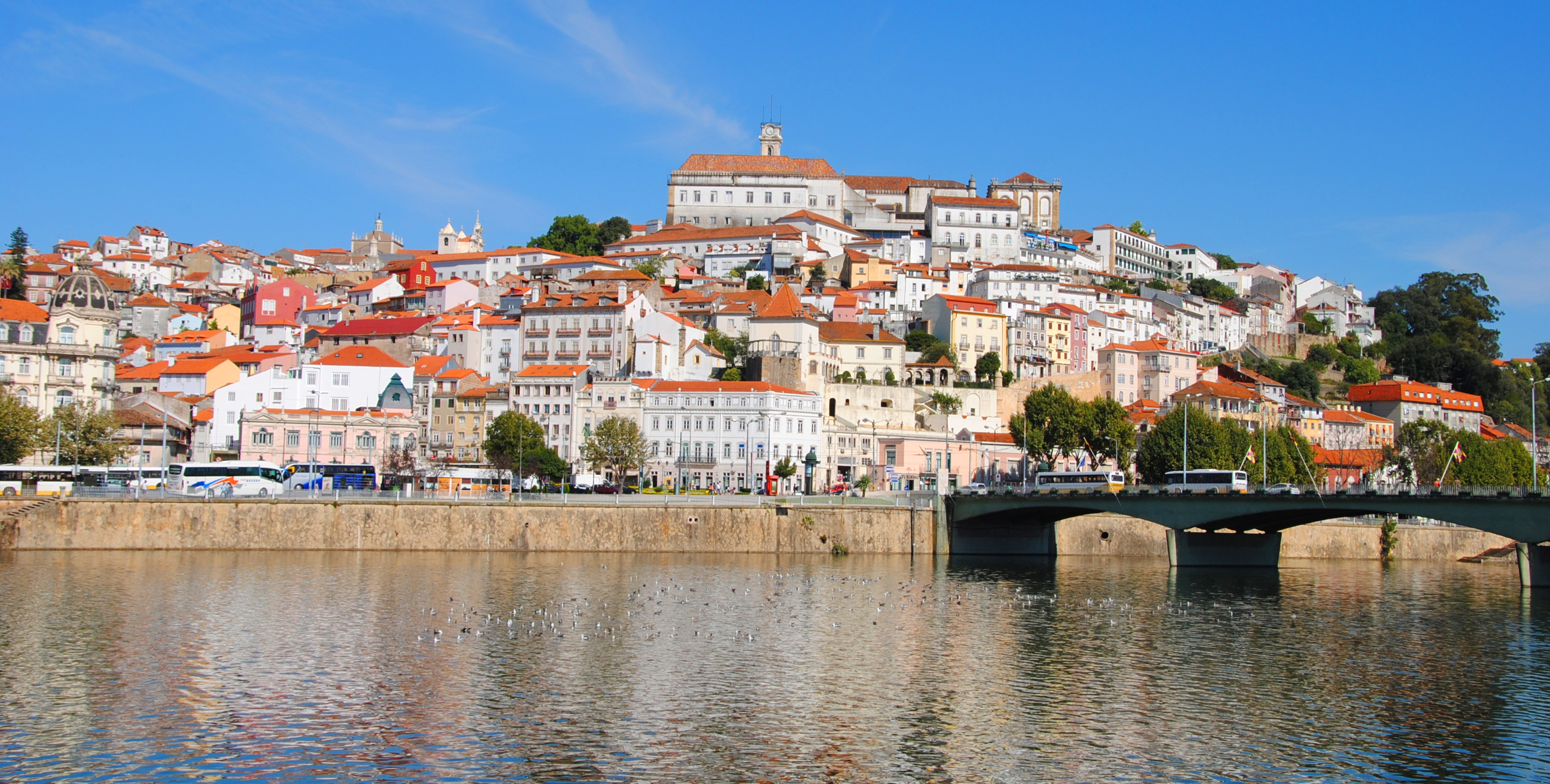
- From top left to right: The village of Monsanto, the Serra da Estrela, the city of Guarda, the city of Leiria, the city of Viseu, the city of Aveiro, the city of Castelo Branco and the capital city of Coimbra
- Etymology: centro, Portuguese for centre
- Interactive map of Central Region
- Country: Portugal
- Region: Central
- Provinces: Beiras
- Capital: Coimbra

Area
  - Total: 28,462 km^{2} (10,989 sq mi)

Population (2011)
  - Total: 2,327,026 (3rd)
  - Density: 81.759/km^{2} (211.75/sq mi)

GDP (nominal)
  - Total: €39.654 billion (2024)
  - Per capita: €23,236 (2024)
- Time zone: UTC+0 (WET)
  - Summer (DST): UTC+1 (WEST)
- HDI (2021): 0.857 very high · 2nd
- NUTS: PT16
- Website: www.centerofportugal.com
- Statistics from INE (2005); geographic detail from Instituto Geográfico Português (2010)

The Central Region (Portuguese: Região do Centro, IPA: [ʁɨʒiˈɐ̃w du ˈsẽtɾu]), also known as Central Portugal (Portugal Central), is one of the statistical regions of Portugal. The cities with major administrative status inside this region are Coimbra, Aveiro, Viseu, Leiria, Castelo Branco and Guarda. It is one of the seven Regions of Portugal (NUTS II subdivisions). It is also one of the regions of Europe, as given by the European Union for statistical and geographical purposes. Its area totals 28,462 km^{2} (10,989 sq mi). As of 2011, its population totalled 2,327,026 inhabitants, with a population density of 82 inhabitants per square kilometre.

== History ==
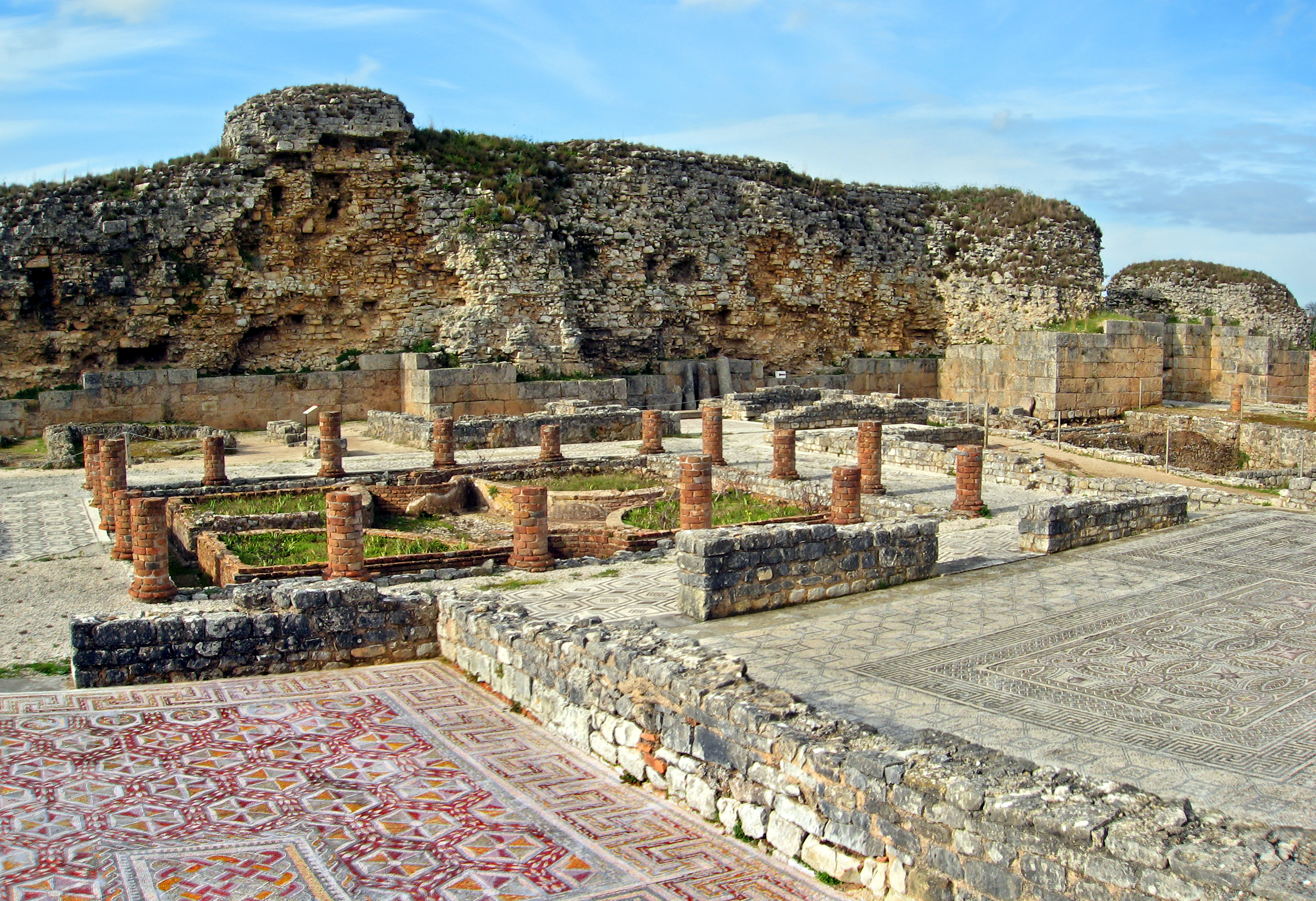
The ancient ruins at Conímbriga, the best preserved ruins in the ancient Roman province of Lusitania.

Inhabited by the Lusitanians, an Indo-European people living in the western Iberian Peninsula, the Romans settled in the region and colonized it as a part of the Roman Province of Lusitânia. The Roman town of Conímbriga, near Coimbra, is among the most noted and well-preserved remains of that period. After the fall of the Western Roman Empire, Visigoths were the main rulers and colonizers from the 5th to the 8th century.

In the 8th century, the Muslim conquest of Iberia turned the region a Muslim-dominated territory.

In the earliest years of the Christian Reconquista, just before the rise of a Portuguese national identity, the region was a battle place between Christian crusaders and Muslim Moors. Once the Christian regained control, kings and landlords made the region a county, called the County of Coimbra. It was integrated into the newly created Condado Portucalensis, the early precursor of the modern nation of Portugal.

The modern region matches up roughly with the boundaries of the historical Beira Province. Beira was an historical province of Portugal and its name was used by the heirs to the Portuguese throne during the monarchy period, before 1910. The princes were known as the Princes of Beira. Since 2024, Oeste in historical Estremadura and Médio Tejo in historical Ribatejo are part of the new NUTS II Oeste e Vale do Tejo region.

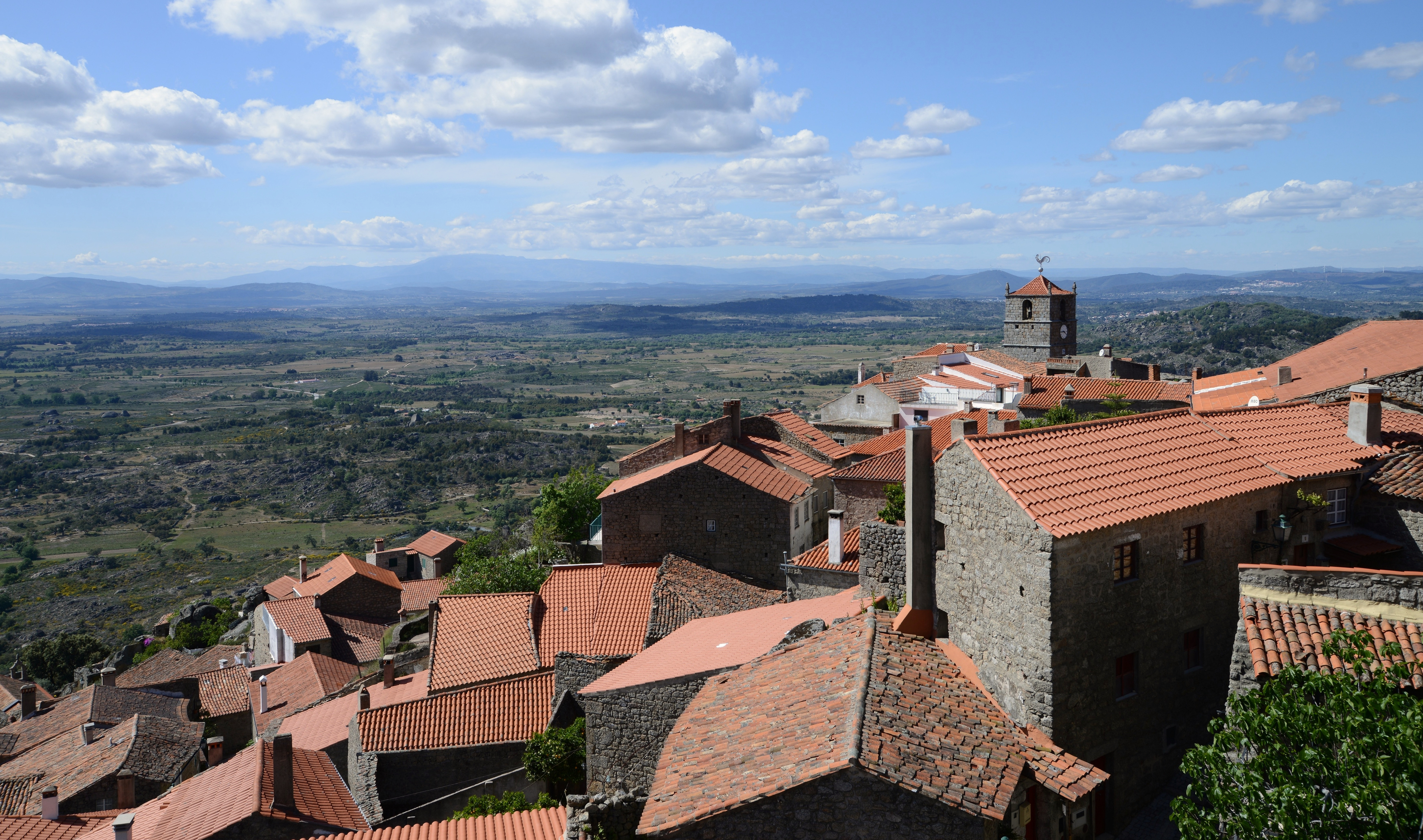
Monsanto, known as "the most Portuguese village of Portugal".

=== Historic villages ===
Along the region's mountainous border with Spain are a series of fortresses and castles that once protected the country from its many invaders. Over the centuries, Moors, Christians, Spaniards and Portuguese have all tried to take these villages, but their higher elevations usually gave them a distinct advantage. On that border, the more than one dozen fortified frontier villages beckon today's visitors to come explore a 900-year history upon which Portugal struggled to become a nation. Today, Portugal has the longest-standing border in all of Europe.

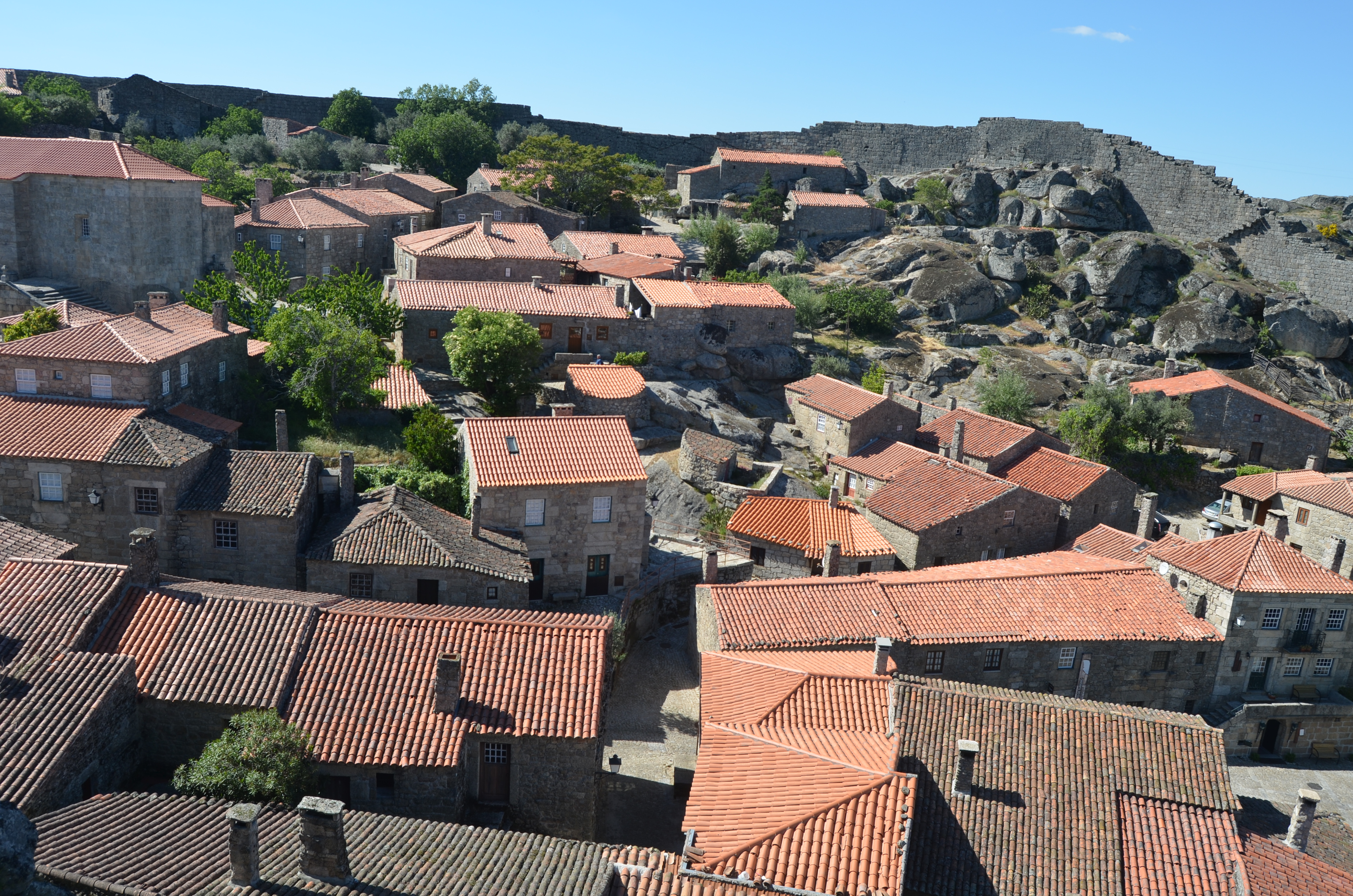
Sortelha, Sabugal municipality, the historic town nestled within the rugged hills.

In these rural border villages, ancient rituals and religious festivals remain popular. Visitors can sample them and partake in the traditional foods of that area, such as cheese, sausages, and mountain honey.

In the fortress town of Almeida, a walk through the narrow cobbled streets can lead a visitor to the ruins of a once mighty 12-pointed fortress. One of Portugal's many Pousadas— an historic property turned into an inn— is located in Almeida.

In the town of Castelo Rodrigo, a memorial stone marks the place of a fierce battle in 1664, and visitors can view the remains of the castle and its keep, as well as a palace. The town also has a small Gothic church. Near Castelo Mendo stands an intricate stone bridge built by the Romans.

=== Frontier castles ===
Most of the castles in this border region of Central are classified as national monuments. These stone fortresses date back to the 11th, 12th and 13th centuries. Castles, or parts of castles, still stand at Alfaiates, Sortelha, Vilar Maior, Sabugal, Castelo Mendo, Castelo Bom, Castelo Rodrigo, Penamacor, Monsanto, Pinhel and Almeida. A 20-castle route has been delineated by the Portugal government (see www.visitportugal.com), of which Sortelha, Castelo Mendo, Castelo Rodrigo and the fortified town of Almeida are considered gems among them all.

== Geography ==
The Sanctuary of Fátima is located in the Central Region of Portugal

The Centro is a region of diversified landscapes. The interior is mountainous with some plateaus, dominated by the Serra da Estrela mountain. The region is plentiful of pine and chestnut trees forests. The green, rugged landscape of this region is crisscrossed by rivers. Several river valleys at the foot of the mountains have a full bodied charm that draw one to outdoor activities like hiking, fishing, tennis and canoeing. In the Winter season, skiing on Serra da Estrela is a popular activity, but in some places, like near the town of Seia, skiing before the Winter season is possible due to artificial snow infrastructures. The coastal plain has several beaches, like the ones of Mira, Figueira da Foz, Ílhavo. Natural landmarks in this region are the Serra da Estrela mountain range (the biggest and highest in mainland Portugal), with its Serra da Estrela Natural Park, the Mondego river (the longest river located exclusively in Portuguese territory), the Aveiro Lagoon (Ria de Aveiro) and the coastal beaches.

The largest urban centres include Coimbra, Aveiro, Viseu, Leiria, Covilhã, Castelo Branco, Figueira da Foz, Guarda, Pombal and Águeda.

=== Subregions ===
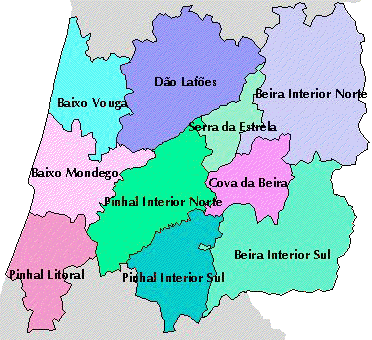
Old subregion map of the Central Region

The region is divided in six sub-regions:

- Beira Baixa
- Beiras e Serra da Estrela
- Região de Aveiro
- Região de Coimbra
- Região de Leiria
- Viseu Dão Lafões

== Economy ==
The Gross domestic product (GDP) of the region was 38.2 billion euros in 2018, accounting for 18.8% of Portugal's economic output. GDP per capita adjusted for purchasing power was 20,100 euros or 67% of the EU27 average in the same year. The GDP per employee was 68% of the EU average.

One of Portugal's richest regions by the abundance of natural streams of water, forests, arable land and its long coast line, the Central region has some of the most economically dynamic and densely populated municipalities of the country. Excellent transportation links with the Lisbon metropolitan area to the south and the Porto Metropolitan Area to the north, making ocean, rail and motorway access possible via containers, have all contributed to making manufacturing the principal industry, found mainly in the littoral strip, which is one of the largest industrialized areas in Portugal. Important products such as motor vehicles, food, electrical appliances, machinery, chemicals, and paper are produced there. Higher education, research and development, healthcare, information technologies, biotechnology, forestry, agriculture, fishing, and tourism industries are all major industries in the region. The wine regions of Dão DOC and Bairrada DOC are among the most reputed in Portugal. The major industrial, commerce, and service centres are located in and around Coimbra, Aveiro, Viseu, Leiria, Covilhã, Castelo Branco, and Figueira da Foz. Important light industry and agriculture is also based in and around Guarda.

== Education ==
The Central region has three public universities: the University of Coimbra, the oldest Portuguese university and the largest in the region; the Aveiro University; and the University of Beira Interior. There are also five state-run polytechnical institutes: Castelo Branco Polytechnical Institute; Coimbra Polytechnical Institute; Guarda Polytechnical Institute; Leiria Polytechnical Institute; Tomar Polytechnical Institute and Viseu Polytechnical Institute. In addition, there are a large number of public nursing schools and private higher education institutions across the region.

== See also ==
- Provinces of Portugal
- Regions of Portugal
