= Francis de Miomandre =

French novelist (1880-1959)

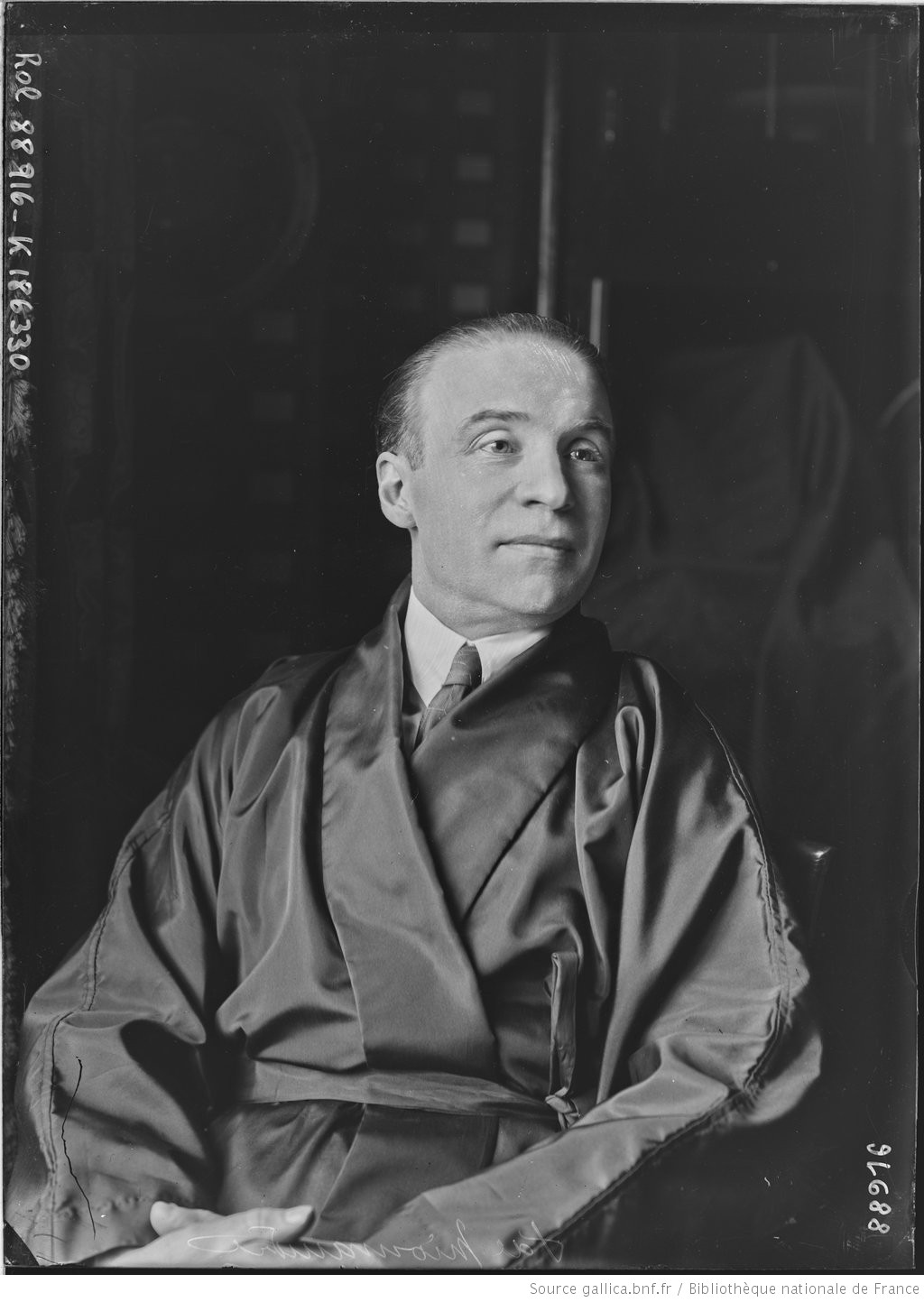
Portrait of Francis de Miomandre

Francis de Miomandre (22 May 1880, in Tours – 1 August 1959, in Saint-Brieuc) was a French novelist and well-known translator from Spanish into French.

== Biography ==
He was born in Tours, Indre-et-Loire, the son of a salesman Gilbert Durand and of Thérèse de Miomandre. He kept his mother's name as his nom de plume. In 1888 he moved with his parents to Marseille and stayed there until 1898, studying at the Jesuit College of St. Ignatius in Marseille. At the same time he befriended a group of young writers. In 1894 they founded a magazine la Revue Méditerranéenne in which he published his early work. In 1900 he met Camille Mockler in Saint-Leu-La-Forêt.

In 1904 Miomandre published his first book "Thoughts and memories" with a circulation of two hundred and twenty copies. He worked with the magazine « le Mercure de France » (Paris) «Antée» (Bruges) and «L'Occident». Francis began to sell paintings at a gallery called Berngayma, and later worked as a secretary to his director - Félix Fénéon. Later, he served as secretary of the editorial board of the journal «L'Art et les artistes» until 1912. He eventually won the Prix Goncourt in 1908 for his novel Écrit sur l'eau.... His novels are highly imaginative and put together with the genuine talent of a romancer who has traveled far and wide at his own study table.

Miomandre wrote thousands of articles for over two hundred magazines and newspapers. This work was his main livelihood. From time to time wrote in the edition Marges, New French Review, Manuscrit autographe and les Cahiers du Sud, and he had a column in the chronicle Nouvelles littéraires from 1922 until his death in 1959. In addition, in 1926, he regularly wrote literary critiques, and collaborated with other magazines. His first critical essays were published in the book "The Face" in 1907. Four years later, he released another collection of essays.

At the same time, he became one of the foremost translators of Spanish. In 1918 Miomandre released "Selected pages" by Jose Enrique Rodo, in 1921 - "Twenty-four sonnets" by Luis de Góngora. Among the authors who Miomandre translated were Miguel de Unamuno, Ventura Garcia Calderon, Miguel de Cervantes, Miguel Angel Asturias, Lydia Cabrera, Horacio Quiroga, Benito Perez Galdos, Enrique Rodríguez Larreta, Lazcano Tags, Eugenio d'Ors, Joaquim Maria Machado de Assis, Jose Martí and others. There are about fifty translated works.

Miomandre wrote articles for many Spanish and Latin American editions, and from 1946 to 1956 was editor of the category "Iberian Literature" for the magazine «Hommes et Mondes». According to Claude Kuffona, every morning Miomandre translated ten pages of text, and in the afternoon and evening worked on critical articles or his own literary works. He wrote easily and critics overwhelmingly recognized the lightness and clarity of his language.

Miomandre also acted as a screenwriter. In 1923 he wrote the screenplay for the film "Shelter of Love, or The Return of Uncle Arsene," based on his novel of the same name.

From 1908 to 1911, he participated in the Club des longues moustaches (Club of long whiskers).

== Works ==
=== Novels ===
- Écrit sur de l'eau... Prix Goncourt (1908)
- Aventures merveilleuses d'Yvan Danubsko, prince valaque (1909)
- Le Vent et la Poussière. (1909)
- L'Ingénu (1910)
- Au Bon Soleil, scènes de la vie provençale (1911)
- Digression peacockienne (1911)
- Gazelle (Mémoire d'une tortue) (1910)
- L'Ingénu (1911)
- Histoire de Pierre Pons, pantin de feutre, roman pour les enfants (1912)
- ...D'amour et d'eau fraîche (1913)
- L'Aventure de Thérèse Beauchamps (1913)
- Le Veau d'Or et la Vache Enragée (1917)
- Pantomime anglaise (1918)
- Voyages d’un sédentaire (1918)
- La Cabane d’amour ou le Retour de l’oncle Arsène (1919)
- Le Mariage de Geneviève (1920)
- L'Amour sous les oliviers (1921)
- Les Taupes (1922)
- Ces Petits Messieurs (1922)
- Le Greluchon sentimental (1923)
- La Naufragée. (1924)
- La Jeune Fille au jardin, unedited novel (1924)
- Contes des cloches de cristal (1925)
- La Bonbonnière d'or (1925)
- L’Ombre et l’Amour. Journal d’un homme timide. (1925)
- Le Radjah de Mazulipatam (1926)
- L’Amour de Mademoiselle Duverrier (1926)
- Olympe et ses amis (1927)
- Les Baladins d’amour (1928)
- Passy-Auteuil ou Le vieux monsieur du square. Monologue intérieur. (1928)
- Soleil de Grasse (1929)
- Baroque (1929)
- Le Jeune Homme des palaces (1929)
- Le Patriarche (1919)
- Vie du sage Prospero (1930)
- Jeux de glaces (1930)
- Âmes russes 1910 (1931)
- Les Égarements de Blandine (1932)
- Otarie. arabesque amoureuse et marine. Dedicated to Blaise Cendrars. (1933)
- Le Zombie (1935)
- Le Cabinet chinois (1936)
- Direction Étoile (1937)
- L'Invasion du paradis (1937)
- Le Fil d’Ariane (1941)
- Portes. (1943)
- Fugues (1943)
- Les Jardins de Marguilène (1943)
- Le Raton laveur et le maître d’hôtel (1944)
- Primevère et l’Ange (1945)
- L'Âne de Buridan (1946)
- La Conférence (1946)
- Rencontres dans la Nuit (1954)
- L’Œuf de Colomb (1954)
- Aorasie (1957)
- Caprices (1960)

=== Poetry ===
- Les Reflets et les souvenirs (1904)
- Samsara (1931)
