= Guillermo Cañedo Malburg =

Mexican sports executive

- Born: February 6, 1986 (age 40); Mexico City, Mexico
- Occupation: Sports Executive

Guillermo "Memo" Cañedo Malburg or Guillermo Cañedo III, (born 1986 in Mexico City) is a Mexican sports executive who is the current CEO of Comunicaciones F.C. He is the son of former Club America president, Guillermo Cañedo White. He is also the grandson of Guillermo Cañedo de la Bárcena, a well-known soccer executive and former FIFA vice-president. Cañedo formerly worked as a Sporting Manager at Club Tijuana Xoloitzcuintles de Caliente.

== Club Tijuana ==
With the team's promotion to first division, Guillermo joined their ranks in 2011. He was a sporting manager and oversaw the operation of the youth squads and was responsible for the club's local amateur 7 on 7 league.

== Comunicaciones F.C. ==
Guillermo replaced fellow Mexican Pedro Portilla White in June 2019, joining the newly appointed Sporting President, Juan Leonel Garcia.

== See also ==
- Club Tijuana Xoloitzcuintles de Caliente
- Estadio Azteca
- Club America
