= Canedo (Santa Maria da Feira) =

Former civil parish in Portugal

- Civil parish
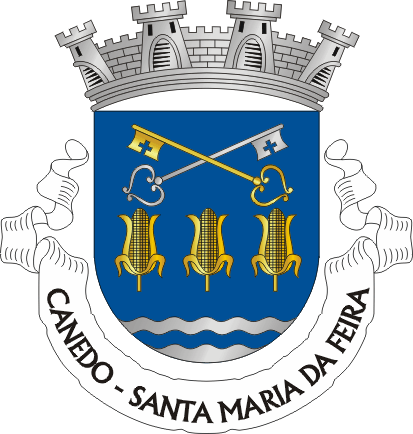
- Coat of arms

- Location in Portugal
- Coordinates: 41°00′N 8°28′W
- Country: Portugal
- Region: Norte
- Metropolitan area: Porto
- District: Aveiro
- Municipality: Santa Maria da Feira
- Disbanded: 2013

Area
  - Total: 27.81 km^{2} (10.74 sq mi)

Population (2001)
  - Total: 5,782
  - Density: 207.9/km^{2} (538.5/sq mi)
- Time zone: UTC+00:00 (WET)
  - Summer (DST): UTC+01:00 (WEST)

Canedo (Portuguese pronunciation: [kɐˈneðu]) is a former civil parish in the municipality of Santa Maria da Feira, Portugal. In 2013, the parish merged into the new parish Canedo, Vale e Vila Maior. It has a population of 5,782 inhabitants and a total area of 27.81 km^{2}.

== Sporting teams ==
- Canedo Futebol Clube
