= Ribacoa =

Ribacoa is a historical area in central Portugal. It is located roughly between Côa and Águeda rivers.
