= Canedo F.C. =

Portuguese football club

Canedo
- Full name: Canedo Futebol Clube
- Founded: 1984
- Ground: Campo das Valadas, Canedo, Santa Maria da Feira
- Capacity: 5,000
- Chairman: Mário Cardoso
- Manager: Cerqueira
- League: AF Aveiro Second Division
- 2012–13: AF Aveiro First Division, 12th (Relegated)
- Website: http://canedofc1984.blogspot.co.uk/

Canedo Futebol Clube, commonly known as Canedo is a Portuguese football club from Canedo, Santa Maria da Feira. Founded in 1984, the club currently plays at the Campo das Valadas which holds a capacity of 5,000.

The club currently plays in the AF Aveiro Second Division, following relegation in the 2012–13 season from the AF Aveiro First Division. The club is currently sponsored by English sportswear manufacturer Umbro.

== Honours ==
- AF Aveiro Cup
  - Winners (1): 2000–01
- AF Aveiro First Division
  - Winners (1): 1990–91
