= 1913 Portuguese legislative election =

| ← 1911 | 16 November 1913 | 1915 → |

37 of the 153 seats to the Chamber of Deputies
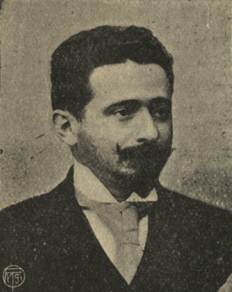

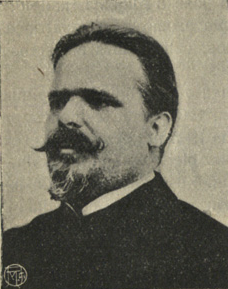

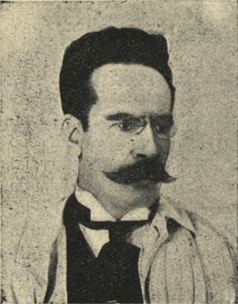
| | First party | Second party |
|---|---|---|
| Leader | Afonso Costa | António José de Almeida |
| Party | Democratic | Evolutionist |
| Seats won | 33 | 2 |
| Seats after | 68 | 41 |
| | Third party | Fourth party |
| | | PSP |
| Leader | Manuel de Brito Camacho |
| Party | Republican Union | Socialist |
| Seats won | 2 | 0 |
| Seats after | 36 | 2 |

Partial parliamentary elections were held in Portugal on 16 November 1913 to elect 37 of the 153 seats in the Chamber of Deputies. They were the first elections under the new constitution approved in 1911, which created a bicameral legislature. The result was a victory for the Democratic Party, which won 33 of the 37 seats, giving it 68 of the 153 seats in the Chamber of Deputies.

== Results ==
| Party | Votes | % | Seats | | |
| Party | Votes | % | Won | Not up | Total |
|---|---|---|---|---|---|
| Democratic Party | | | 33 | 35 | 68 |
| Evolutionist Party | | | 2 | 39 | 41 |
| Republican Union | | | 2 | 34 | 36 |
| Portuguese Socialist Party | | | 0 | 2 | 2 |
| Independents | | | 0 | 6 | 6 |
| Total | | | 37 | 116 | 153 |
| Total votes | 150,000 | – | | | |
| Registered voters/turnout | 397,038 | 37.78 | | | |
Source: Eleições 1913
