= Timeline of rival political parties =

This article lists a timeline of notable political rivalries by country. Political party rivalries concern competition between organized groups of people, united by political principles and seeking elective office to advance policies. They are distinct from rivalries between ruling families based on dynastic or hereditary claims, and from armed conflicts between nations. This list will not indicate every rival political party within a nation, such as in multiple-party governments. Only the most notable and significant political parties are presented. Rival political alliances may be included as well.

== Ancient to Medieval rivalries ==
=== Roman Republic ===
| Rivalry | Beginning Year | Ending Year |
|---|---|---|
| Populares vs Optimates | 56 BC | 27 BC |

== Early modern to present ==
=== Albania ===
| Rivalry | Beginning Year | Ending Year |
|---|---|---|
| Socialist Party vs Democratic Party | 1991 | present |

=== Argentina ===
| Rivalry | Beginning Year | Ending Year |
|---|---|---|
| Justicialist Party vs Radical Civic Union | 1983 | 2015 |
| Front for Victory vs Juntos por el Cambio | 2015 | 2019 |
| Justicialist Party vs Republican Proposal | 2015 | present |
| Frente de Todos vs Juntos por el Cambio | 2019 | present |

=== Australia ===
| Rivalry | Beginning Year | Ending Year |
|---|---|---|
| Australian Labor Party vs Coalition | 1923 | present |

=== Austria ===
| Rivalry | Beginning Year | Ending Year |
|---|---|---|
| People's Party vs Social Democratic Party | 1945 | present |

=== Bangladesh ===
| Rivalry | Beginning Year | Ending Year |
|---|---|---|
| Bangladesh Awami League vs Jatiya Samajtantrik Dal | 1972 | 1975 |
| Bangladesh Awami League vs Bangladesh Nationalist Party | 1991 | 2024 |
| Grand Alliance vs Jatiya Oikya Front | 2008 | 2022 |
| Bangladesh Nationalist Party vs Bangladesh Jamaat-e-Islami | 2024 | Present |

=== Bulgaria ===
| Rivalry | Beginning Year | Ending Year |
|---|---|---|
| Socialist Party vs Union of Democratic Forces | 1990 | 2001 |
| National Movement for Stability and Progress vs Socialist Party | 2001 | 2009 |
| Socialist Party vs GERB | 2009 | 2021 |
| We Continue the Change vs GERB | 2021 | present |

=== Cambodia ===
| Rivalry | Beginning Year | Ending Year |
|---|---|---|
| Cambodian People's Party vs FUNCINPEC | 1993 | present |
| Cambodian People's Party vs Candlelight Party | 1998 | 2012 |
| Cambodian People's Party vs Cambodia National Rescue Party | 2012 | 2017 |

=== Canada ===
| Rivalry | Beginning Year | Ending Year |
|---|---|---|
| Liberal Party of Canada vs Conservative Party of Canada (1867–1942) | 1867 | 1942 |
| Liberal Party of Canada vs Progressive Conservative Party of Canada | 1942 | 2003 |
| Liberal Party of Canada vs Conservative Party of Canada | 2003 | present |

=== Chile ===
| Rivalry | Beginning Year | Ending Year |
|---|---|---|
| Concertación vs Alliance | 1990 | 2017 |
| Chile Vamos vs Nueva Mayoría | 2017 | 2022 |

=== China ===
| Rivalry | Beginning Year | Ending Year |
|---|---|---|
| Kuomintang vs Chinese Communist Party | 1927 | 1949 |

=== Colombia ===
| Rivalry | Beginning Year | Ending Year |
|---|---|---|
| Liberal Party vs Conservative Party | 1958 | 2002 |

=== Croatia ===
| Rivalry | Beginning Year | Ending Year |
|---|---|---|
| Croatian Democratic Union vs Social Democratic Party | 2000 | present |

=== Cyprus ===
| Rivalry | Beginning Year | Ending Year |
|---|---|---|
| Democratic Party vs Democratic Rally | 1983 | 2008 |
| Progressive Party of Working People vs Democratic Rally | 2008 | present |

=== Czech Republic ===
| Rivalry | Beginning Year | Ending Year |
|---|---|---|
| Civic Democratic Party vs Social Democratic Party | 1996 | 2013 |
| ANO 2011 vs Social Democratic Party | 2013 | 2017 |
| ANO 2011 vs Civic Democratic Party | 2017 | present |
| ANO 2011 vs Spolu | 2021 | present |

=== Denmark ===
| Rivalry | Beginning Year | Ending Year |
|---|---|---|
| Social Democrats vs Venstre & Conservatives | 1918 | present |

=== France ===
| Rivalry | Beginning Year | Ending Year |
|---|---|---|
| French Section of the Workers' International vs Union for the New Republic | 1962 | 1967 |
| Federation of the Democratic and Socialist Left vs Union of Democrats for the Republic | 1967 | 1969 |
| Socialist Party vs Union of Democrats for the Republic | 1969 | 1976 |
| Socialist Party vs Rally for the Republic | 1976 | 2002 |
| Socialist Party vs Union for a Popular Movement | 2002 | 2015 |
| Socialist Party vs The Republicans | 2015 | 2017 |

=== Georgia ===
| Rivalry | Beginning Year | Ending Year |
|---|---|---|
| Georgian Dream vs United National Movement | 2012 | present |

=== Germany ===
| Rivalry | Beginning Year | Ending Year |
|---|---|---|
| Social Democratic Party of Germany vs Christian Democratic Union of Germany | 1945 | present |

=== Ghana ===
| Rivalry | Beginning Year | Ending Year |
|---|---|---|
| New Patriotic Party vs National Democratic Congress | 1992 | present |

=== Greece ===
| Rivalry | Beginning Year | Ending Year |
|---|---|---|
| Panhellenic Socialist Movement vs New Democracy | 1974 | 2012 |
| Syriza vs New Democracy | 2004 | present |

=== Hong Kong ===
| Rivalry | Beginning Year | Ending Year |
|---|---|---|
| Pro-Beijing camp vs Pro-democracy camp | 1984 | present |
| Democratic Alliance vs Democratic Party | 1998 | present |
| Democratic Alliance vs Civic Party | 2012 | present |

=== Hungary ===
| Rivalry | Beginning Year | Ending Year |
|---|---|---|
| Fidesz vs Socialist Party | 1998 | 2018 |
| Fidesz-KDNP vs United for Hungary | 2020 | 2022 |

=== India ===
| Rivalry | Beginning Year | Ending Year |
|---|---|---|
| Indian National Congress vs Communist Party of India | 1951 | 1967 |
| Indian National Congress vs Janata Party | 1977 | 1984 |
| United Progressive Alliance vs National Democratic Alliance | 1989 | 1991 |
| Indian National Congress vs Bharatiya Janata Party | 1991 | present |
| Indian National Congress vs National Democratic Alliance | 1998 | 2004 |
| United Progressive Alliance vs National Democratic Alliance | 2004 | 2023 |
| Indian National Developmental Inclusive Alliance vs National Democratic Alliance | 2023 | present |

=== Indonesia ===
| Rivalry | Beginning Year | Ending Year |
|---|---|---|
| Democratic Party (Indonesia) vs Indonesian Democratic Party of Struggle | 2004 | present |

=== Ireland ===
| Rivalry | Beginning Year | Ending Year |
|---|---|---|
| Fianna Fáil vs Fine Gael | 1933 | present |

=== Israel ===
| Rivalry | Beginning Year | Ending Year |
|---|---|---|
| Alignment Party vs Gahal | 1965 | 1973 |
| Likud vs Israeli Labor Party | 1988 | 2014 |
| Likud vs Zionist Union | 2014 | 2019 |

=== Italy ===
| Rivalry | Beginning Year | Ending Year |
|---|---|---|
| Historical Right vs Historical Left | 1861 | 1891 |
| Christian Democracy vs Communist Party | 1948 | 1991 |
| Christian Democracy vs Democratic Party of the Left | 1991 | 1994 |
| Centre-right coalition vs Centre-left coalition | 1995 | present |
| Pole for Freedoms vs The Olive Tree | 1996 | 2001 |
| House of Freedoms vs The Olive Tree | 2001 | 2007 |
| House of Freedoms vs The Union | 2007 | 2008 |
| Centre-right coalition vs Italy. Common Good | 2012 | 2013 |

=== Jamaica ===
| Rivalry | Beginning Year | Ending Year |
|---|---|---|
| Jamaica Labour Party vs People's National Party | 1943 | present |

=== Japan ===
| Rivalry | Beginning Year | Ending Year |
|---|---|---|
| Liberal Democratic Party vs Social Democratic Party | 1955 | 1994 |
| Liberal Democratic Party vs New Frontier Party | 1994 | 1997 |
| Liberal Democratic Party vs Democratic Party (1996-1998) | 1997 | 1998 |
| Liberal Democratic Party vs Democratic Party (1998-2016) | 1998 | 2016 |
| Liberal Democratic Party vs Democratic Party (2016-2018) | 2016 | 2018 |
| Liberal Democratic Party vs Constitutional Democratic Party | 2017 | present |
| Liberal Democratic Party vs Democratic Party for the People | 2018 | present |

=== Macau ===
| Rivalry | Beginning Year | Ending Year |
|---|---|---|
| Pro-establishment camp vs Pro-democracy camp | 1990 | present |
| New Macau Association vs Union for Development | 2001 | 2013 |
| New Macau Association vs Macau United Citizens Association | 2005 | present |

=== Malaysia ===
| Rivalry | Beginning Year | Ending Year |
|---|---|---|
| Barisan Nasional vs Barisan Alternatif | 1998 | 2004 |
| Barisan Nasional vs Pakatan Rakyat | 2008 | 2015 |
| Barisan Nasional vs Pakatan Harapan | 2015 | present |

=== Malta ===
| Rivalry | Beginning Year | Ending Year |
|---|---|---|
| Reform Party vs Democratic Nationalist Party | 1883 | 1921 |
| Maltese Political Union vs Democratic Nationalist Party | 1921 | 1926 |
| Nationalist Party vs Labour Party | 1926 | present |

=== Mexico ===
| Rivalry | Beginning Year | Ending Year |
|---|---|---|
| Institutional Revolutionary Party vs National Action Party | 1982 | 2018 |
| Juntos Hacemos Historia vs Va por México | 2020 | 2023 |

=== Mongolia ===
| Rivalry | Beginning Year | Ending Year |
|---|---|---|
| Mongolian People's Party vs Democratic Union Coalition | 1996 | 2000 |
| Mongolian People's Party vs Democratic Party | 2000 | present |

=== Myanmar ===
| Rivalry | Beginning Year | Ending Year |
|---|---|---|
| National League for Democracy vs Union Solidarity and Development Party | 2010 | present |

=== New Zealand ===
| Rivalry | Beginning Year | Ending Year |
|---|---|---|
| Liberal Party vs Reform Party | 1909 | 1928 |
| Labour Party vs United-Reform Coalition | 1931 | 1936 |
| Labour Party vs National Party | 1936 | present |

=== North Macedonia ===
| Rivalry | Beginning Year | Ending Year |
|---|---|---|
| Social Democratic Union vs VMRO-DPMNE | 1994 | present |

=== Norway ===
| Rivalry | Beginning Year | Ending Year |
|---|---|---|
| Labour Party vs Conservative Party | 1921 | present |

=== Philippines ===
| Rivalry | Beginning Year | Ending Year |
|---|---|---|
| Progresista Party vs Nacionalista Party | 1907 | 1916 |
| Democrata Party vs Nacionalista Party | 1916 | 1931 |
| Liberal Party vs Nacionalista Party | 1946 | 1971 |
| Lakas ng Bayan vs Kilusang Bagong Lipunan | 1978 | 1987 |
| Lakas–NUCD vs Nationalist People's Coalition | 1992 | 1998 |
| People Power Coalition vs Puwersa ng Masa | 2000 | 2003 |
| Koalisyon ng Katapatan at Karanasan sa Kinabukasan vs Koalisyon ng Nagkakaisang Pilipino | 2003 | 2006 |
| TEAM Unity vs Genuine Opposition | 2006 | 2009 |
| Team PNoy vs United Nationalist Alliance | 2012 | 2016 |
| Koalisyon ng Daang Matuwid vs Partido Galing at Puso | 2015 | 2018 |
| Otso Diretso vs Hugpong ng Pagbabago | 2018 | 2021 |

Starting in 1992, sextennial presidential elections allows political realignment to take place, with administration (government) and opposition coalitions taking shape. These won't become apparent after the election, and cements into the mid-term election three years later. The process repeats in the next presidential election.

=== Poland ===
| Rivalry | Beginning Year | Ending Year |
|---|---|---|
| Civic Platform vs Law and Justice | 2005 | present |

=== Portugal ===
| Rivalry | Beginning Year | Ending Year |
|---|---|---|
| Regenerator Party vs Historic Party | 1856, 1874 | 1870, 1878 |
| Reformist Party vs Historic Party | 1870 | 1874 |
| Regenerator Party vs Progressive Party | 1878 | 1910 |
| Democratic Party vs Evolutionist Party | 1911, 1918 | 1917, 1919 |
| Democratic Party vs Republican Liberal Party | 1919 | 1925 |
| Democratic Party vs Nationalist Republican Party | 1925 | 1926 |
| Socialist Party vs Social Democratic Party | 1975 | present |

=== Russia ===
| Rivalry | Beginning Year | Ending Year |
|---|---|---|
| Reform Party vs Democratic Nationalist Party | 1883 | 1921 |
| United Russia vs Union of Right Forces | 2001 | 2008 |
| United Russia vs Communist Party of the Russian Federation | 2001 | present |
| United Russia vs Solidarnost | 2008 | present |

=== Singapore ===
| Rivalry | Beginning Year | Ending Year |
|---|---|---|
| People's Action Party vs Workers' Party | 1968 | Present |

=== South Africa ===
| Rivalry | Beginning Year | Ending Year |
|---|---|---|
| National Party vs South African Party | 1915 | 1934 |
| African National Congress v. National Party | 1994 | 1999 |
| Democratic Alliance vs African National Congress | 2000 | Present |

=== South Korea ===
| Rivalry | Beginning Year | Ending Year |
|---|---|---|
| National Association vs Democratic Party (1945) | 1946 | 1951 |
| Liberal Party vs Democratic Party (1945) | 1951 | 1955 |
| Liberal Party vs Democratic Party (1955) | 1955 | 1963 |
| Republican Party vs Civil Rights Party | 1963 | 1967 |
| Republican Party vs Democratic Party (1967) | 1967 | 1980 |
| Justice Party vs Democratic Party (1967) | 1980 | 1981 |
| Justice Party vs Democratic Party (1981) | 1981 | 1988 |
| Justice Party vs Democratic Party (1987) | 1988 | 1990 |
| Korea Party (1990) vs Democratic Party (1987) | 1990 | 1991 |
| Korea Party (1990) vs Democratic Party (1991) | 1991 | 1995 |
| Korea Party (1990) vs National Congress | 1995 | 1997 |
| Korea Party (1997) vs National Congress | 1997 | 2000 |
| Korea Party (1997) vs Democratic Party (2000) | 2000 | 2003 |
| Korea Party (1997) vs Uri Party | 2003 | 2007 |
| Korea Party (1997) vs Democratic Party (2008) | 2007 | 2011 |
| Korea Party (1997) vs Democratic Party (2011) | 2011 | 2014 |
| Korea Party (1997) vs Democratic Party (2014) | 2014 | 2020 |
| People Power Party vs Democratic Party (2014) | 2020 | present |

=== Spain ===
| Rivalry | Beginning Year | Ending Year |
|---|---|---|
| People's Alliance vs Spanish Socialist Workers' Party | 1979 | 1989 |
| People's Party vs Spanish Socialist Workers' Party | 1989 | present |

=== Sweden ===
| Rivalry | Beginning Year | Ending Year |
|---|---|---|
| Social Democratic Party vs Moderate Party | 1940 | present |

=== Taiwan ===
| Rivalry | Beginning Year | Ending Year |
|---|---|---|
| Kuomintang vs Democratic Progressive Party | 1986 | present |

=== Thailand ===
| Rivalry | Beginning Year | Ending Year |
|---|---|---|
| Democrat Party vs Thai Rak Thai Party | 1998 | 2007 |
| Democrat Party vs People's Power Party | 2007 | 2008 |
| Democrat Party vs Pheu Thai Party | 2008 | 2014 |

=== Turkey ===
| Rivalry | Beginning Year | Ending Year |
|---|---|---|
| Justice and Development Party vs Republican People's Party | 2003 | present |
| People's Alliance vs Nation Alliance | 2018 | 2023 |

=== United Kingdom ===
| Rivalry | Beginning Year | Ending Year |
|---|---|---|
| Whigs vs Tories | 1678 | 1834 |
| Whigs vs Conservative Party | 1834 | 1859 |
| Liberal Party vs Conservative Party | 1859 | 1922 |
| Conservative Party vs Labour Party | 1900 | present |
| Democratic Unionist Party vs. Sinn Féin | 1994 | present |

=== United States ===
| Rivalry | Beginning Year | Ending Year |
|---|---|---|
| Federalist Party vs Democratic-Republican Party | 1799 | 1824 |
| Democratic Party vs Whig Party | 1833 | 1854 |
| Republican Party vs Democratic Party | 1854 | Present |

=== Venezuela ===
| Rivalry | Beginning Year | Ending Year |
|---|---|---|
| Democratic Action vs Copei | 1958 | 1998 |
| Great Patriotic Pole vs Democratic Unity Roundtable | 2010 | present |
