= 1919 Portuguese legislative election =

- 11 May 1919

All 163 seats in the Chamber of Deputies 82 seats needed for a majority
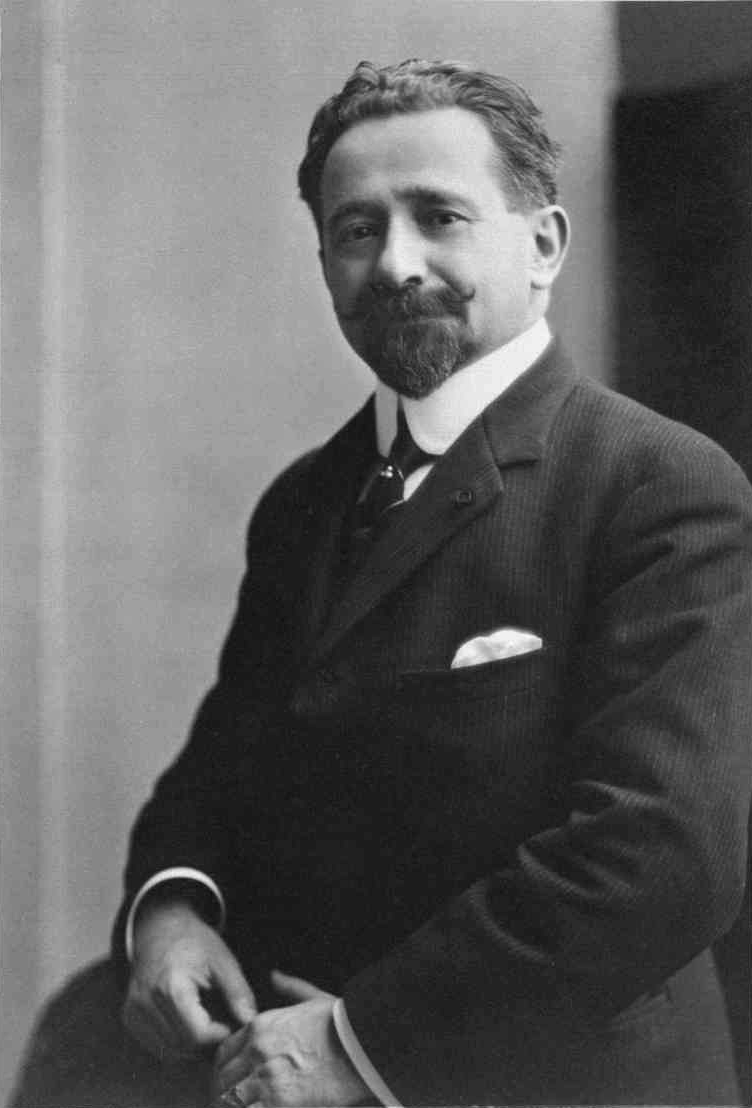

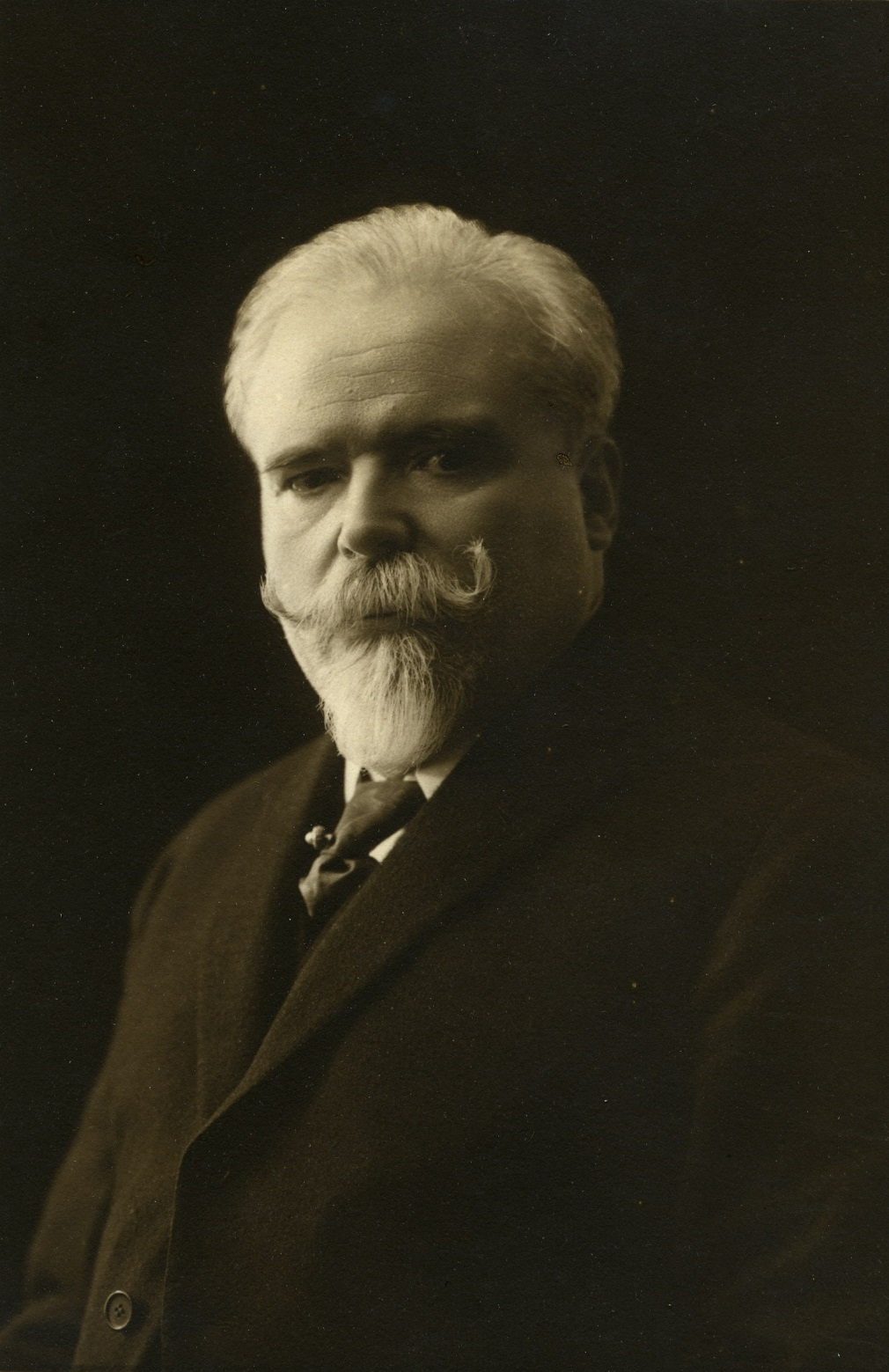

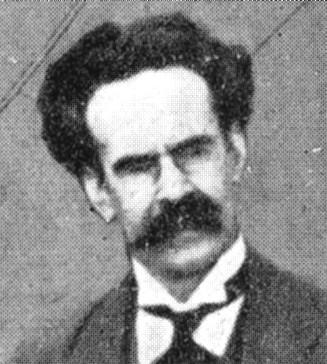
	First party	Second party	Third party
Leader	Afonso Costa	António José de Almeida	Manuel de Brito Camacho
Party	Democratic	Evolutionist	Republican Union
Last election	Boycotted	Boycotted	Boycotted
Seats won	96	38	17
Seat change	New	New	New
	Fourth party	Fifth party
	PSP	PCC
Leader		António Lino Neto
Party	Socialist	PCC
Last election	Boycotted	5 seats
Seats won	8	1
Seat change	New	▼4
Prime Minister before election
Domingos Leite Pereira
Independent
Prime Minister after election
Alfredo Ernesto de Sá Cardoso
Democratic

Parliamentary elections were held in Portugal on 11 May 1919. The three main parties that boycotted the 1918 elections returned to contest the elections. The result was a victory for the Democratic Party, which won 86 of the 163 seats in the House of Representatives and 36 of the 71 seats in the Senate.

== Results ==
=== Chamber of Deputies ===
Party	Seats	+/–
Democratic Party	86	New
Evolutionist Party	38	New
Republican Union	17	New
Portuguese Socialist Party	8	New
Portuguese Catholic Centre	1	–4
Other parties and independents	13	+8
Total	163	+8
Source: Nohlen & Stöver

=== Senate ===
Party	Seats	+/–
Democratic Party	36	New
Evolutionist Party	27	New
Republican Union	27	New
Portuguese Catholic Centre	1	0
Portuguese Socialist Party	0	New
Other parties and independents	7	–23
Total	71	–2
Source: Nohlen & Stöver
