= João Tamagnini Barbosa =

Portuguese politician and military officer (1883–1948)

Brigadier João Tamagnini Barbosa
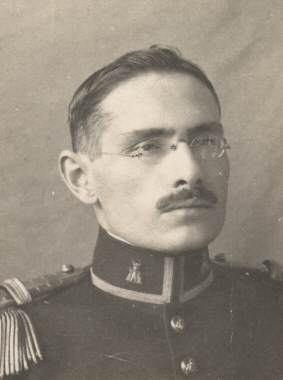

Prime Minister of Portugal
- In office 23 December 1918 – 27 January 1919
- President: João do Canto e Castro
- Preceded by: João do Canto e Castro (interim); Sidónio Pais (effective)
- Succeeded by: José Relvas

Minister for the Colonies
- In office 11 December 1917 – 15 May 1918
- President: Sidónio Pais
- Prime Minister: Sidónio Pais
- Preceded by: Ernesto Jardim de Vilhena
- Succeeded by: Alexandre José de Vasconcelos e Sá

Minister for War
- In office 11 May 1918 – 15 May 1918
- President: Sidónio Pais
- Prime Minister: Sidónio Pais
- Preceded by: Sidónio Pais
- Succeeded by: Amílcar Abreu Mota

Minister for Interior
- In office 15 May 1918 – 9 October 1918
- President: Sidónio Pais
- Prime Minister: Sidónio Pais
- Preceded by: Henrique Forbes Bessa
- Succeeded by: António Bernardino de Sousa Ferreira

Minister of Finance
- In office 9 October 1918 – 23 December 1918
- President: Sidónio Pais; João do Canto e Castro
- Prime Minister: Sidónio Pais (October 9, 1918–December 14, 1918); João do Canto e Castro (14 December 1918–23 December 1918)
- Preceded by: Francisco Xavier Esteves
- Succeeded by: Ventura Malheiro Reimão

Minister for Interior
- In office 23 December 1918 – 27 January 1919
- President: João do Canto e Castro
- Prime Minister: Himself
- Preceded by: António Bernardino de Sousa Ferreira
- Succeeded by: José Relvas

President of the S.L. Benfica
- In office 25 January 1947 – 15 December 1948
- Preceded by: António Afonso da Costa e Sousa (as interim)
- Succeeded by: António Afonso da Costa e Sousa (as interim)

Personal details
- Born: 30 December 1883 Portuguese Macau
- Died: 15 December 1948 (aged 64) Portugal
- Party: Republican Centrist Party later National Republican Party ("Sidonist Party")
- Spouse: Maria Luísa da Cunha e Silva
- Relations: Artur Tamagnini de Sousa Barbosa (brother)
- Children: Maria Helena; Luís Artur
- Parent(s): Artur da Mota Tamagnini Barbosa (father); Fátima Carolina Correia de Sousa (mother)
- Occupation: Army officer (Brigadier) and engineer

Military service
- Allegiance: Kingdom of Portugal; Portugal
- Branch/service: Portuguese Army
- Years of service: 1879–1948
- Rank: Brigadier

João Tamagnini de Sousa Barbosa (30 December 1883 – 15 December 1948), commonly known as João Tamagnini Barbosa (Portuguese pronunciation: [ʒuˈɐ̃w tamaˈɲini βɐɾˈβɔzɐ]), or Tamagnini Barbosa, was a Portuguese military officer and politician of the Portuguese First Republic (1910–1926).

== Biography ==
He served as Minister of Interior, Colonies and Finances during the period known as "New Republic", after the coup d'état of the National Republican Party ("Sidonist Party") and the semi-dictatorial government of President/Prime Minister Sidónio Pais, followed by a brief participation in the provisional government of João do Canto e Castro after the assassination of Sidónio Pais.

He briefly served as prime minister, after João do Canto e Castro, from 23 December 1918 to 27 January 1919.

After the 28 May 1926 revolution that installed the Ditadura Nacional (National Dictatorship) regime that would be followed by António de Oliveira Salazar's Estado Novo (New State), he was elected President of the General Assembly of S.L. Benfica on 19 January 1946. Moreover, he served as the 18th president of Benfica from 25 January 1947 to 15 December 1948.

== Legacy ==
The Escola Luso-Chinesa de Tamagnini Barbosa (巴波沙中葡小學) in Macau previously existed, but was later replaced by Zheng Guanying Official School in 2011.

Preceded by Manuel da Conceição Afonso	President of Benfica; 1947–1948	Succeeded by Mário de Gusmão Madeira
