= 1918 Portuguese general election =

- 28 April 1918
- Presidential election
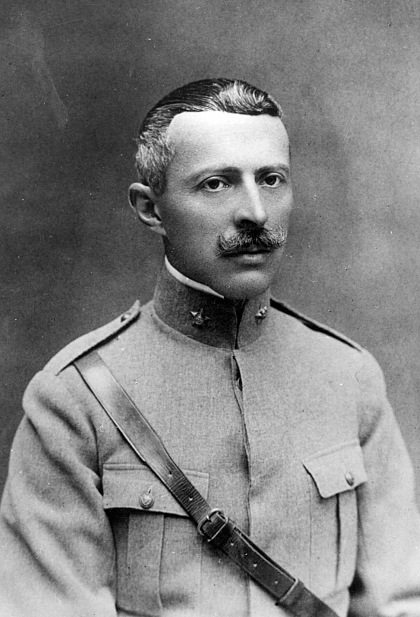
Nominee	Sidónio Pais
Party	PNR
Popular vote	470,831
Percentage	100.0%
President before election
Sidónio Pais
PNR
Elected President
Sidónio Pais
PNR
- Chamber of Deputies
- All 155 seats in the Chamber of Deputies
Party	Leader	Seats	+/–
PNR	Sidónio Pais	108	New
CM		37	New
PCC	António Lino Neto	5	+4
Others	–	5	−8
This lists parties that won seats. See the complete results below.
- Senate
- All 73 seats in the Senate
Party	Leader	Seats	+/–
PNR	Sidónio Pais	32	New
CM		10	New
PCC	António Lino Neto	1	0
Others	–	30	+27
This lists parties that won seats. See the complete results below.
Prime Minister before	Prime Minister after election
Sidónio Pais; PNR	Sidónio Pais; PNR

General elections were held in Portugal on 28 April 1918, following a coup by Sidónio Pais in December 1917. The elections were boycotted by the Democratic Party, the Evolutionist Party and the Republican Union, who had won over 90% of the seats in the 1915 elections.

Although they included the first direct vote election for the position of President, Pais was the only candidate and the vote was uncontested. In the parliamentary elections the result was a victory for the National Republican Party, which won 108 of the 155 seats in the House of Representatives and 32 of the 73 seats in the indirectly elected Senate.

== Results ==
=== President ===
Candidate	Party	Votes	%
Sidónio Pais	National Republican Party	470,831	100.00
Total		470,831	100.00
Valid votes		470,831	91.61
Invalid/blank votes		43,127	8.39
Total votes		513,958	100.00
Registered voters/turnout		900,000	57.11
Source: Nohlen & Stöver; Presidency

=== Chamber of Deputies ===
Party	Votes	%	Seats	+/–
National Republican Party			108	New
Monarchist Cause			37	New
Portuguese Catholic Centre			5	4
Other parties and independents			5	–8
Total			155	–8
Registered voters/turnout	900,000	–		
Source: Nohlen & Stöver

Chamber of Deputies seats
PNR	69.68%
CM	23.87%
CCP	3.23%
Others	3.23%

=== Senate ===
Party	Votes	%	Seats	+/–
National Republican Party			32	New
Monarchist Cause			10	New
Portuguese Catholic Centre			1	0
Other parties and independents			30	+27
Total			73	+4
Registered voters/turnout	900,000	–		
Source: Nohlen & Stöver

Senate seats
PNR	43.84%
CM	13.70%
CCP	1.37%
Others	41.10%

== Aftermath ==
Pais was assassinated in Lisbon on 14 December. On 16 December João do Canto e Castro was elected by parliament for a "transitional term".
