= 1918 Portuguese presidential election =

- 16 December 1918
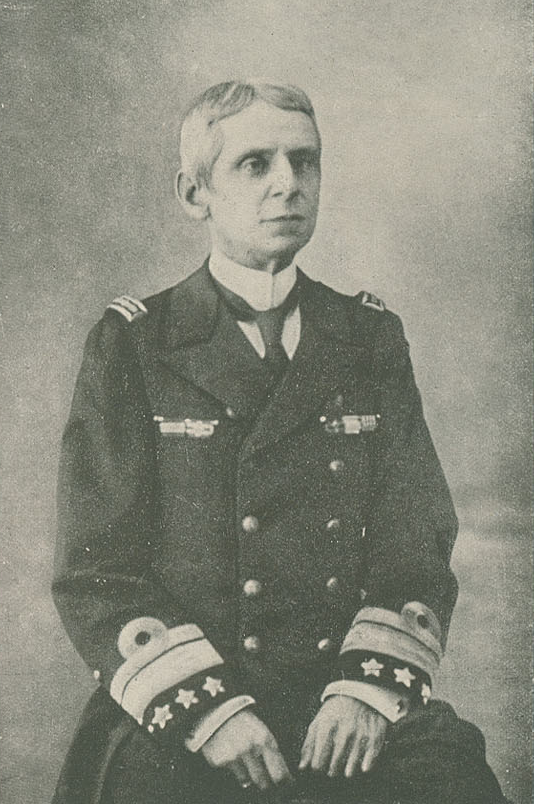
Candidate	João do Canto e Castro
Party	PNR
Electoral vote	137
Percentage	99.28%
President before election
Sidónio Pais
PNR
Elected President
João do Canto e Castro
PNR

Presidential elections were held in Portugal on 16 December 1918. Following Portugal's 1911 constitution, the Congress of the Republic must elect the president in Lisbon instead of the Portuguese people.

The election was held two days after the assassination of the Portuguese president Sidónio Pais on 14 December 1918. There were a total of four candidates. At the first ballot quorum wasn't reached, so the election was repeated, this time with the necessary members present. National Republican João do Canto e Castro won against his opponents and he was elected as the new President of Portugal succeeding the late Sidónio Pais.

== Results ==
Candidate	Party	First round		Second round	
Candidate	Party	Votes	%	Votes	%
João do Canto e Castro	National Republican Party	121	96.80	137	99.28
Tomás Garcia Rosado	Independent	1	0.80		
Basílio Teles	Democratic Party	1	0.80		
José Relvas	Republican Union	1	0.80		
Blank votes		1	0.80	1	0.72
Total		125	100.00	138	100.00
