= Nationalist Republican Party (Portugal) =

Nationalist Republican Party Partido Republicano Nacionalista
- Founded: 1923
- Dissolved: 1926
- Merger of: Republican Liberal Party; Reconstitution Party; National Republican Party
- Headquarters: Lisbon, Portugal
- Ideology: Sidonism; Conservatism; Nationalism; Social conservatism
- Political position: Right-wing

The Nationalist Republican Party (Portuguese: Partido Republicano Nacionalista, PRN, usually called Nationalists) was a right-wing republican party during the First Portuguese Republic. It was founded as a merger of the Republican Liberal Party, the Reconstitution Party and some elements of the old National Republican Party of Sidónio Pais. Initially with moderate conservative orientation, it drifted increasingly to the right, making concessions to Catholic constituencies towards the end of the First Republic.

== History ==
After the leader of the Republican Liberal Party (PRL), António Granjo, was assassinated in the "Bloody Night" of 19 October 1921, the Liberals and Reconstituents started negotiations to merge the two parties in 1922. On 7 February 1923, the public manifesto of the Nationalist Republican Party was finally signed. The party constituted a "bloc of the Rights", intended to incorporate both conservative republicans and frustrated monarchists. It was designed to challenge the power of then hegemonic Democratic Party. The adherents of PRN were predominantly proprietors, shopkeepers, militaries, public servants, physicians, and lawyers. It held close links with the Banco Nacional Ultramarino and other important banks and major corporations.

On 15 November 1923, the Nationalists formed a government, led by António Ginestal Machado. It included Óscar Carmona, future president of the Estado Novo, as minister of war and lasted one month. In December 1923, Álvaro de Castro left the PRN to form a new government, which did not include Nationalists, but Democrats, independents and members of the "Seara Nova". De Castro's government, which lasted until July 1924, was opposed by the PRN, most outspokenly by Francisco Cunha Leal.

Notable leaders of the Nationalist Republican Party, besides Machado, included Tomé de Barros Queirós, Júlio Dantas, and José Mendes Cabeçadas, Cunha Leal, who left to found the Liberal Republican Union in 1926, and, after 1925, Commander Filomeno da Câmara de Melo Cabral, one of the organisers of the 18 April 1925 Generals' Coup.

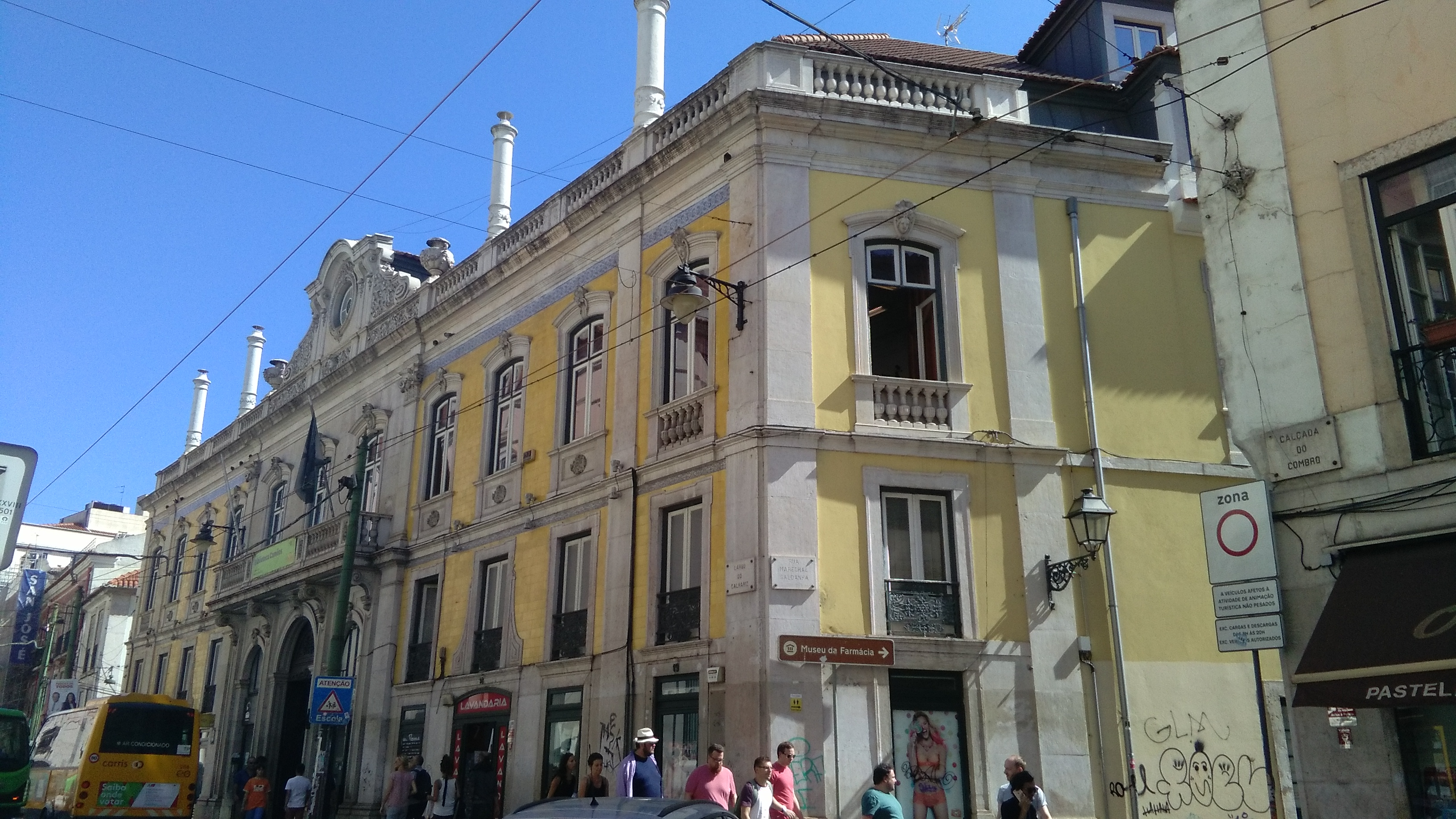
Calhariz Palace, where the first official NRP meeting took place (5 of February 1923)

The secession of the Liberal Republican Union in March 1926, and the beginning of the Ditadura Nacional at the end of May of the same year, marked the end of the Nationalist Republican Party. In the early 1930s many former members of the PRN joined the National Union, ruling party of the Estado Novo.

== See also ==
- Category:Nationalist Republican Party (Portugal) politicians

== Bibliography ==
- Wheeler, Douglas L. (1978), Republican Portugal: A Political History, 1910-1926, The University of Wisconsin Press, p. 237, ISBN 9780299074548
