= 1915 Portuguese legislative election =

← 1913	13 June 1915	1918 →
- Turnout: 59.9% (▲22.8pp)
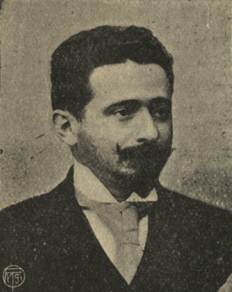

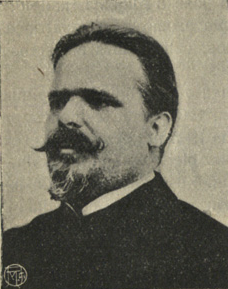

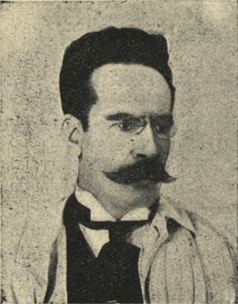

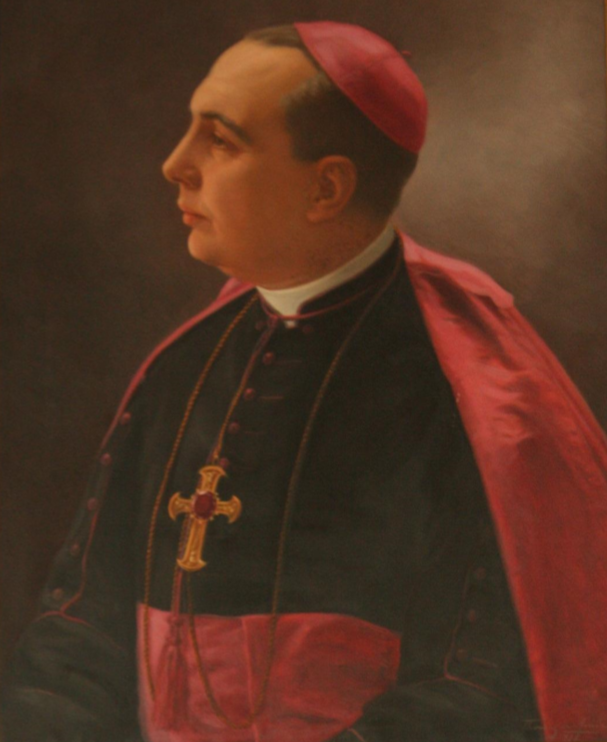
	Majority party	Minority party	Third party
Leader	Afonso Costa	António José de Almeida	Manuel de Brito Camacho
Party	Democratic	Evolutionist	Republican Union
Last election	68 (Chamber); 24 (Senate)	41 (Chamber); 16 (Senate)	36 (Chamber); 18 (Senate)
Seats won	106 (Chamber); 45 (Senate)	26 (Chamber); 9 (Senate)	15 (Chamber); 11 (Senate)
	Fourth party	Fifth party
	PSP
Leader		António Augusto de Castro Meireles
Party	Socialist	PCC
Last election	2 (Chamber); 2 (Senate)	Did not contest
Seats won	2 (Chamber); 0 (Senate)	1 (Chamber); 1 (Senate)
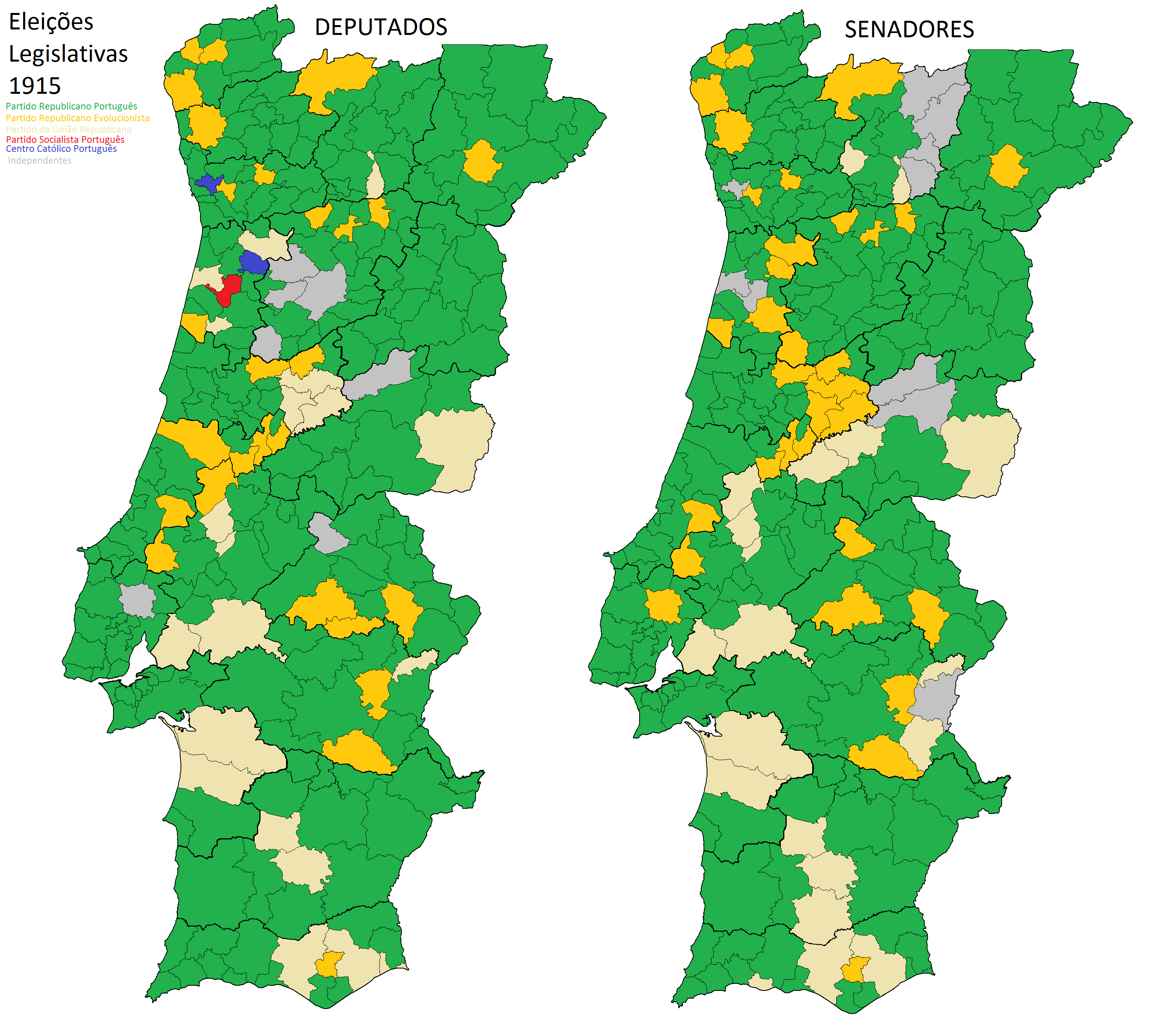
- Most voted-for party by municipality
Prime Minister before election
José de Castro
Democratic
Prime Minister after election
Afonso Costa
Democratic

Parliamentary elections were held in Portugal on 13 June 1915. The result was a victory for the Democratic Party, which won 106 of the 163 seats in the Chamber of Deputies and 45 of the 69 seats in the Senate.

== Results ==
=== Chamber of Deputies ===
Party	Votes	%	Seats	+/–
Democratic Party			106	+38
Evolutionist Party			26	–15
Republican Union			15	–21
Portuguese Socialist Party			2	0
Catholic Centre Party			1	New
Other parties and independents			13	+7
Total			163	+10
Total votes	282,387	–		
Registered voters/turnout	471,557	59.88		
Source: Nohlen & Stöver

Chamber of Deputies seats
Democratic Party	65.03%
Evolutionist Party	15.95%
Republican Union	9.20%
Socialist Party	1.23%
Catholic Center	0.61%
Others	7.98%

=== Senate ===
Party	Votes	%	Seats	+/–
Democratic Party			45	+21
Republican Union			11	–7
Evolutionist Party			9	–7
Catholic Centre Party			1	New
Portuguese Socialist Party			0	–2
Other parties and independents			3	–3
Total			69	+3
Total votes	276,188	–		
Registered voters/turnout	471,557	58.57		
Source: Nohlen & Stöver

Senate seats
Democratic Party	65.22%
Republican Union	15.94%
Evolutionist Party	13.04%
Catholic Center	1.44%
Others	4.35%
