= António Lino Neto =

Portuguese Catholic politician, lawyer and professor

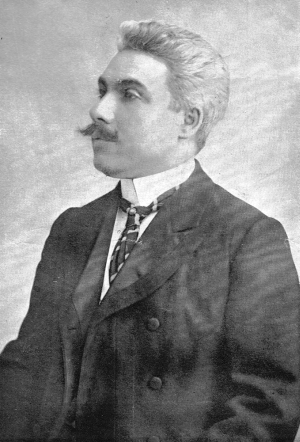
António Lino Neto

António Lino Neto (Mação, 30 January 1873 – 16 November 1961) was a Portuguese Catholic politician, lawyer and professor of Political Economy. He was politically active during the end of the Constitutional Monarchy, the First Republic and the beginning of the Estado Novo. He was the president of the Catholic Centre Party.

== Personal life ==
Lino Neto was born in Mação, to Lino Leitão Neto and Rosa Marques Correia da Silva. He went to the Seminary in Portalegre, and then studied Law in the University of Coimbra (from 1894 to 1899). In 1901 he marries his wife, Maria Matilde da Cruz Antunes de Mendonça. In 1908 he moves with his family to Lisbon and accepts a position as full professor in Instituto Industrial e Comercial de Lisboa. His office, as lawyer, was located in Rua Nova do Almada. António Lino Neto acquires the Santana Palace in Lisbon in 1919. He would be vice-rector of the Technical University of Lisbon from 1938 to 1943.

Lino Neto had 8 children, one of which was António Maria de Mendonça Lino Neto, who would be Minister of Justice during the Estado Novo.

Lino Neto was a close friend of Guerra Junqueiro, António Sérgio and poet Afonso Lopes Vieira.

== Political career ==
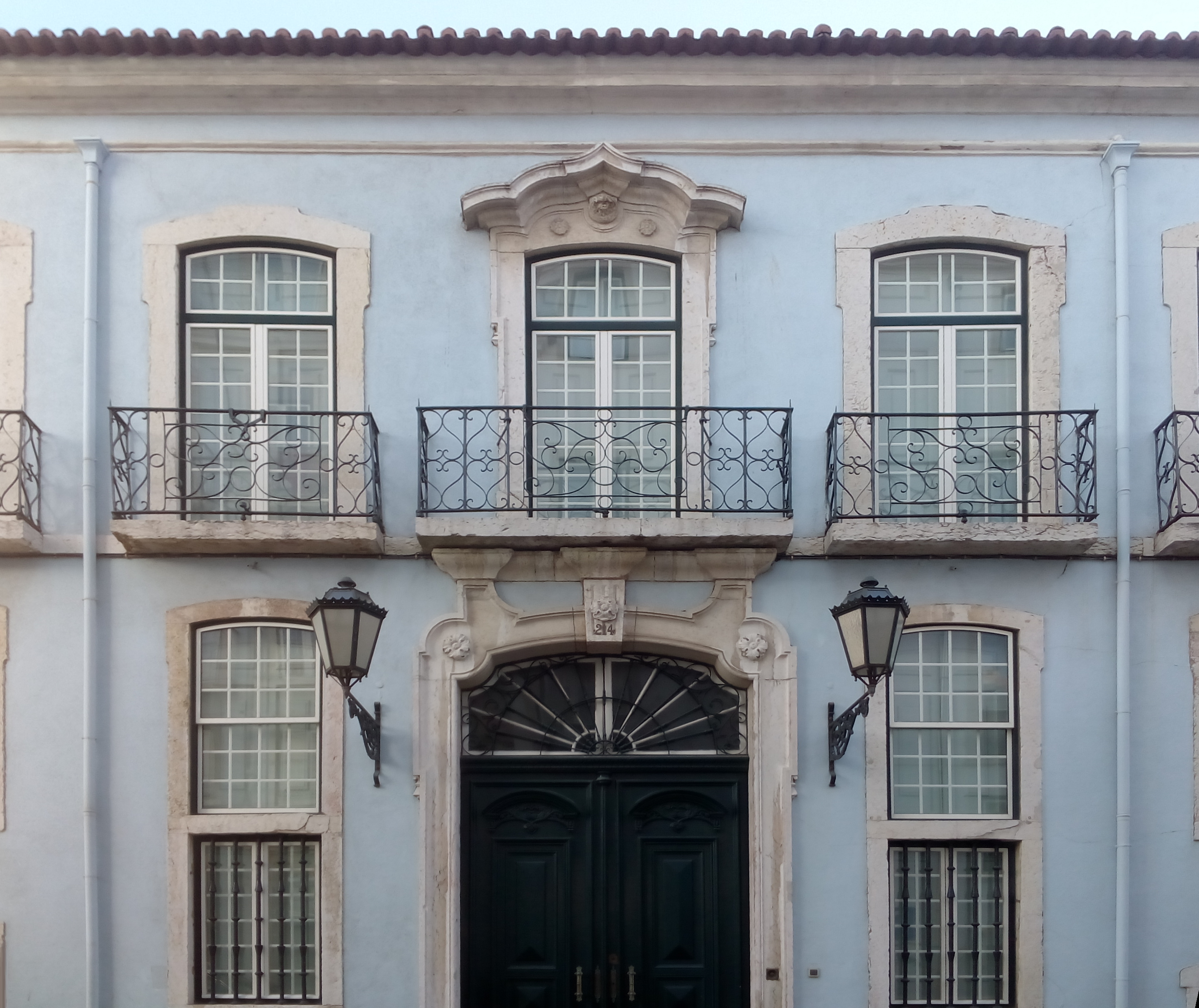
Palácio Santana, Lino Neto's residence in 1919.

Lino Neto published his political views in various journals and books and took part of various Catholic associations before, in 1919, being nominated President of the newly formed Catholic Centre Party. In 1920, Lino Neto directed A União, CCP's official weekly publication. His main political positions at the beginning of the 20th century were: the revitalization of the Catholic Church through improved education of the clergy, economic reform based on a reinvestment on agriculture; and a public administration reform through decentralization, in favor of Municipalities. Lino Neto was criticized by the Republicans, because he defended the right of Catholics to social and political intervention, and by the Monarchists, because he did not defend a return to Monarchism.

Lino Neto resigns from the presidency of CCP in 1934, dedicating himself to his academic life and law practice. From 1941 on, he slowly halts these professional activities, but continues writing.

He was awarded Knight Grand Cross of the Order of St. Gregory the Great by bishop António Mendes Belo.

== Writings ==
- Various pieces for O Distrito de Portalegre – 1894/1904
- O quinhão económico da vida – The economic share of life – 1940
- Adam Smith – Fundador da Economia Política – Adam Smith – The Founder of Political Economy – 1936
- A Questão Agrária – The Agrarian Issue – 1908
- A Questão Administrativa (o Municipalismo em Portugal) - The Administrative Issue (Municipalism in Portugal) – 1911
- Elementos de Economia Política – Elements of Political Economy – 1935/1936
