= National Republican Party (Portugal) =

Defunct political party in Portugal

National Republican Party Partido Nacional Republicano
- Leader: Sidónio Pais
- Founded: 1918
- Dissolved: 1923
- Merged into: Nationalist Republican Party
- Headquarters: Lisbon, Portugal
- Ideology: Sidonism; Nationalism; Social conservatism
- Political position: Right-wing

The National Republican Party (Portuguese: Partido Nacional Republicano, PNR), unofficially known as the Sidonist Party (Partido Sidonista) after its leader Sidónio Pais, was a political party in Portugal.

== History ==
The party was established in April 1918 in order to contest the general elections later that month. Pais was the only candidate for president, and was elected unopposed, whilst the PNR won 108 of the 155 seats in the House of Representatives and 32 of the 73 Senate seats. However, the elections were boycotted by the Democratic Party, the Evolutionist Party and the Republican Union, which had won all but 16 of the seats in the 1915 elections.

After Pais was assassinated later in December 1918, the party went into decline, and merged with the Republican Liberal Party and the Reconstitution Party to form the Nationalist Republican Party in 1923.
