= Portuguese Catholic Centre =

Portuguese political party

Portuguese Catholic Centre Centro Católico Português
- Abbreviation: CCP
- President: Alberto Pinheiro Torres (1917–1919); António Lino Neto (1919–1934)
- Founded: 22 January 1915; 8 August 1917
- Dissolved: February 1934; January 1940
- Religion: Catholicism

The Portuguese Catholic Centre (Portuguese: Centro Católico Português, CCP) was a political party in Portugal. Founded in 1915, it won seats in six consecutive elections, before being disbanded in January 1940.

== History ==
The party was established in Braga in 1915 and won a single seat in both the House of Representatives and the Senate in the parliamentary elections later that year. The 1918 elections were boycotted by the three largest parties, and saw the PCC win five House seats and retain its seat in the Senate. The party was reduced back to a single seat in both chambers in the 1919 elections, but won three seats in both chambers in the 1921 elections. Although it was reduced to a single Senate seat in the 1922 elections, the PCC won five seats in the House. The 1925 elections saw the party retain its Senate seat and win four seats in the House.

After the 28 May 1926 coup d'état, the PCC's direction supported the vote on the National Union and many of its members were invited by António de Oliveira Salazar to become part of the National Union. The CCP would have no presence in Parliament after the coup, despite not being disbanded. Instead, the CCP would then serve to provide administrative assistance to the clergy and other catholic corporations. On 7 February 1934, António Lino Neto (who had been president since 1919) resigned from the party after a letter from Pope Pius XI recognized another Catholic association, Acção Católica Portuguesa. The party was officially disbanded by the episcopacy in January 1940, in the context of the 1940 Concordat between Portugal and the Holy See. At the time it was the last non-government party still in operation, 14 years after the coup.

== Election results ==
Elections	Chamber of Deputies	Senate
1915	1 / 163	1 / 69
1918	5 / 155	1 / 73
1919	1 / 163	1 / 71
1921	3 / 163	3 / 71
1922	5 / 163	1 / 70
1925	4 / 163	1 / 65

== Notable members ==
- António de Oliveira Salazar, who ran in the 1921 Portuguese legislative election (elected as representative of Guimarães) and 1925 Portuguese legislative election (Arganil candidate, was not elected).
- António Lino Neto, president of the party (1919 - 1934).
- João J. Fonseca Garcia, president of the party (1934).

== See also ==
- Christian Democratic Party (1975–2004)
- Citizenship and Christian Democracy (2009–present)
