= First Portuguese Republic =

1910–1926 republic in Southwestern Europe

Coordinates: 38°42′N 9°11′W

Portuguese Republic República Portuguesa (Portuguese)
- 1910–1926
- Flag Coat of arms
- Motto: Ordem e Trabalho ("Order and Work")
- Anthem: A Portuguesa "The Portuguese"
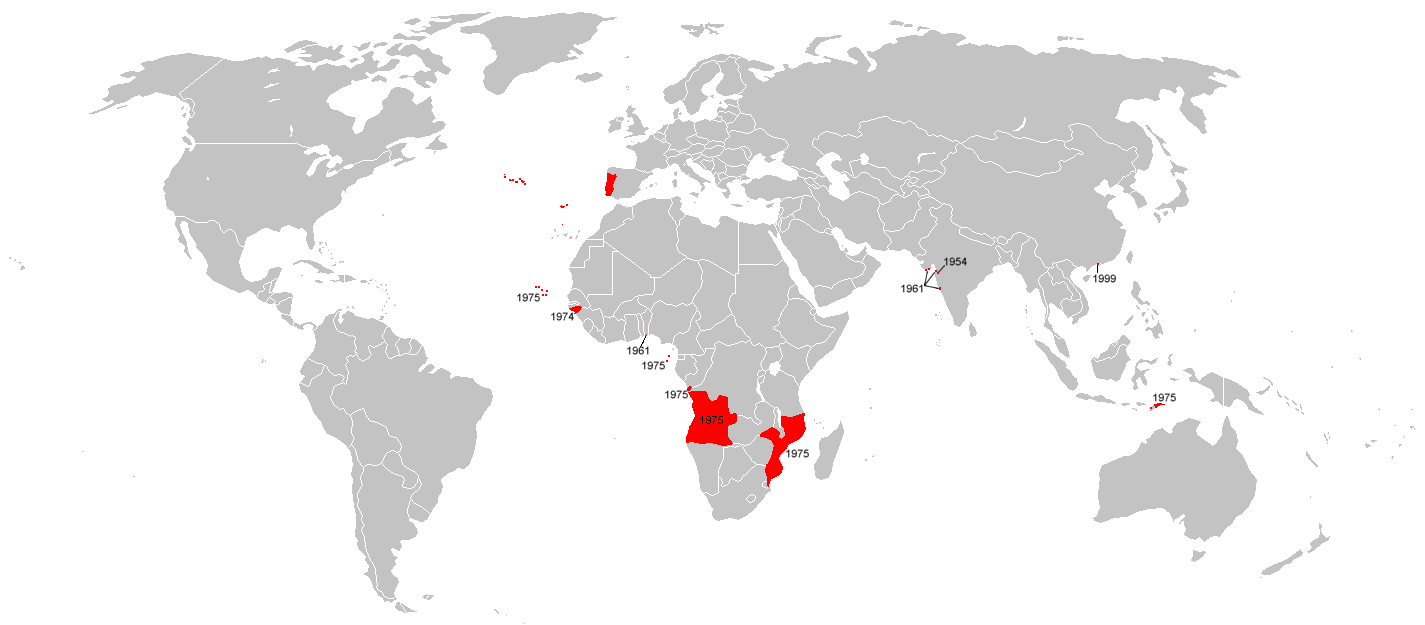
- The Portuguese Republic in 1914
- Capital: Lisbon
- Common languages: Portuguese
- Demonym: Portuguese
- Government: Parliamentary republic
- President
  - 1911–1915 (first): Manuel de Arriaga
  - 1925–1926 (last): Bernardino Machado
- Prime Minister
  - 1911 (first): João Pinheiro Chagas
  - 1925–1926 (last): António Maria da Silva
- Legislature: Congress of the Republic
  - Upper house: Senate
  - Lower house: Chamber of Deputies
- History
  - Established: 5 October 1910
  - Constitution: 21 August 1911
  - 1917 coup d'état: 5–8 December 1917
  - Disestablished: 29 May 1926
- Currency: Portuguese real (1910–1911); Portuguese escudo (1911–1926)
Preceded by	Succeeded by
Kingdom of Portugal and the Algarves; German East Africa	Ditadura Nacional

The First Portuguese Republic (Portuguese: Primeira República Portuguesa; officially: República Portuguesa, Portuguese Republic) spans a complex 16-year period in the history of Portugal, between the end of the period of constitutional monarchy marked by the 5 October 1910 revolution and the 28 May 1926 coup d'état. The latter movement instituted a military dictatorship known as Ditadura Nacional (national dictatorship) that would be followed by the corporatist Estado Novo (new state) regime of António de Oliveira Salazar.

The sixteen years of the First Republic saw eight presidents and 45 ministries, and were altogether more of a transition between the Kingdom of Portugal and the Estado Novo than they were a coherent period of governance.

== Early years of the Republic ==
After the republican uprising of 5 October 1910 that overthrew King Manuel II, a republican constitution was approved in 1911, inaugurating a parliamentary regime with little power in the hands of the president and a bicameral system. The republic caused important fractures in Portuguese society, especially between the monarchical rural population, the unions and the Catholic Church. Even the Republican Party was divided. The most conservative sector separated to form the Evolutionist Party and the Republican Union Party. Despite those secessions, the Portuguese Republican Party (commonly known as Democratic Party after this split, unlike the previous Portuguese Republican Party to the proclamation of the Republic), led by Afonso Costa remained the main political force of the Republic. The opposition forces began to use violence as a method to get closer to power, as there was no truly democratic political and parliamentary tradition, while almost all political factions were fighting for radical transformations that would end the immobility that had characterized the House of Braganza.

The Democratic Party (officially Portuguese Republican Party) saw in the beginning of the First World War a unique opportunity to achieve its objectives: an end to the threat of an invasion by Spain and foreign occupation of the colonies, and within the internal level, creating a national consensus around the regime and even around the party. These domestic objectives were not achieved, since participation in the conflict decreed in 1917 was not subject to national consensus and it was not possible to mobilize the population, even more so there was hostility towards entering the war when Portugal had to send a contingent of almost 12,000 soldiers to France and colonial troops from Germany invaded the Portuguese colony of Mozambique. What happened was the opposite: Portugal's financial difficulties prevented it from forming an adequate contingent for the war, and the armed forces were not prepared for a fight on a European scale, which is why internal criticism of Portugal's entry into the war caused ideological differences to widen. The lack of consensus on Portugal's participation in the war made possible the emergence of two dictatorships, led by Pimenta de Castro (January – May 1915) and Sidónio Pais (1917–1918), called the President-King.

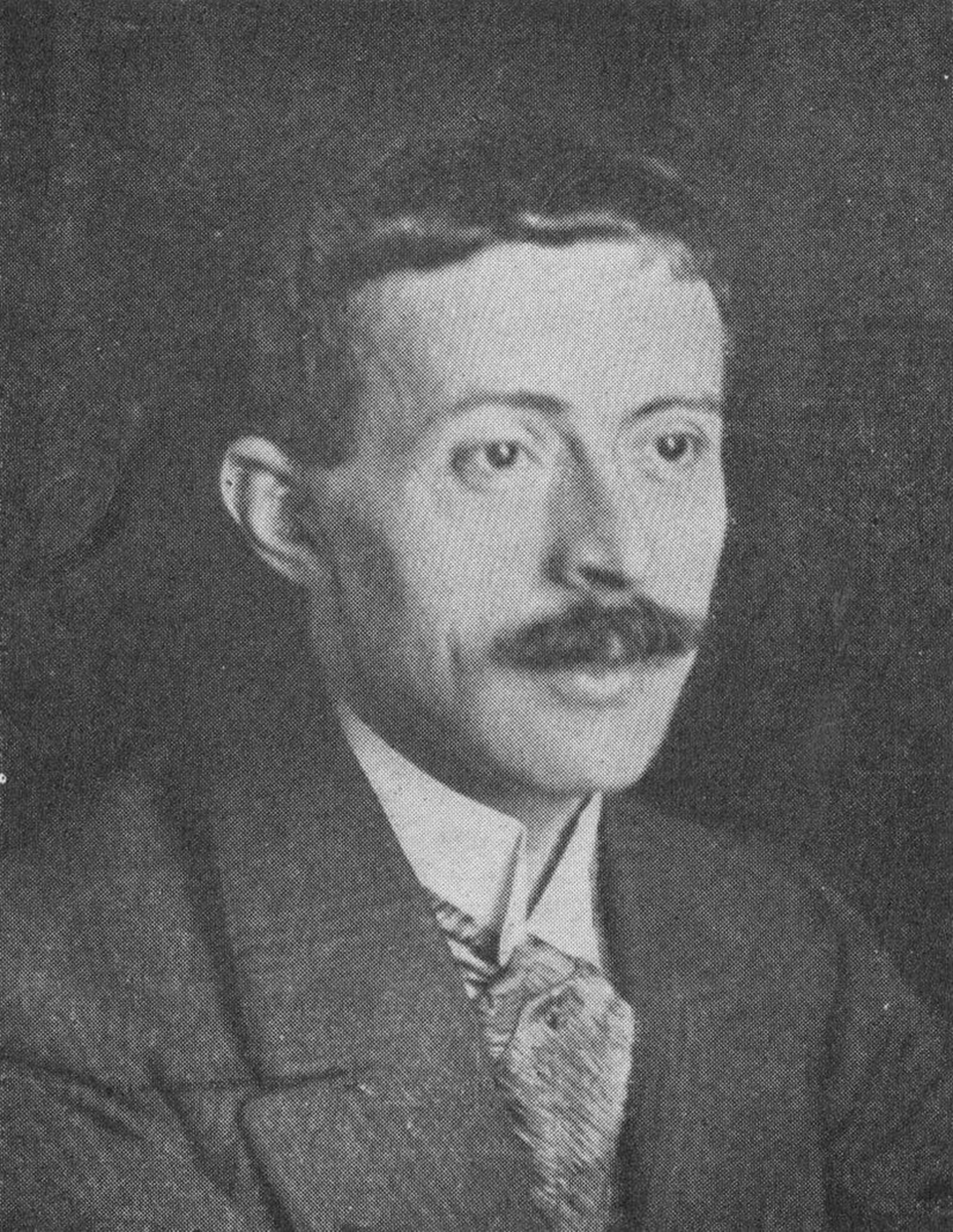
President Sidónio Pais

Sidonism, also called Dezembrismo, contained certain elements of modernization, but said regime preached some of the political solutions that would be used by the dictatorships — totalitarians and fascists of the 1920s and 1930s. Sidónio Pais tried to rescue traditional values, especially the Pátria and tried to govern in a charismatic way. Attempts were made to abolish traditional parties and alter the existing model of national representation in parliament (which was said to exacerbate divisions within the homeland), through the creation of a corporatist senate and a single party, the National Republican Party, as well as the attribution of functions to its leader. The state carried out an interventionist economic policy. Sidónio Pais also attempted to restore public order, turning the republic into a more acceptable model for the monarchists and Catholics who still remained a political force.

The power vacuum created after the assassination of Sidónio Pais on 14 December 1918 led the country into a brief civil war. In northern Portugal the restoration of the monarchy was proclaimed on 9 January 1919 and four days later a monarchical insurrection took place in Lisbon. A republican coalition, led by José Relvas coordinated the repression of the uprisings using military personnel loyal to the regime and armed civilians. After a series of confrontations with the monarchists, they were definitively defeated in Porto on 13 February 1919. This military victory allowed the Portuguese Republican Party return to government and emerge triumphant in the elections that took place during that year, winning them by an absolute majority.

== Search for stability ==
It was during this republican restoration that a reform was attempted to provide the regime with greater stability. In August 1918 a conservative President was elected – António José de Almeida (whose Evolutionist Party had joined during the war with the Portuguese Republican Party , to form the "Sacred Union") – and his government was given the power to dissolve parliament. The relations with the Holy See that had been restored by Sidónio Pais, were preserved. The president used his new power to resolve the government crisis of May 1921, appointing the Liberal Party (the result of the postwar merger between the Evolutionists and the Unionists) to prepare for the next election.

The Portuguese Republican Party won again by an absolute majority, but discontent with this situation did not disappear. There were many accusations of political corruption, and the opposition's attacks increased. At the same time, all political parties suffered from infighting, especially the ruling party. The party system was discredited because the government of the Portuguese Republican Party that had emerged from the polls was not really stable. The presidents' opposition to single-party governments that disagreed with the Portuguese Republican Party and everyone's desire to monopolize power caused the virtual absence of stability in the nation's government. Several different formulas were tried, including single-party governments, coalitions and presidential executives but none of them had any effect, causing the use of force to be considered "the only way" for the opposition to prevail if it wanted to enjoy the fruits of the power.

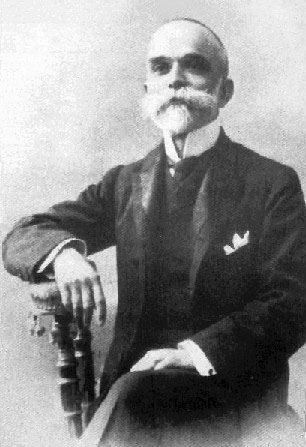
Bernardino Machado, last president of the First Portuguese Republic.

== Religion ==
The First Republic was intensely anti-clerical. Historian Stanley Payne points out, "The majority of Republicans took the position that Catholicism was the number one enemy of individualist middle-class radicalism and must be completely broken as a source of influence in Portugal." Under the leadership of Afonso Costa, the Minister of Justice, the revolution immediately targeted the Catholic Church; the provisional government began devoting its entire attention to an anti-religious policy, in spite of the disastrous economic situation. On 8 October the religious orders in Portugal were expelled, and their property was confiscated. On 10 October–five days after the inauguration of the Republic–the new government decreed that all convents, monasteries and religious orders were to be suppressed. All residents of religious institutions were expelled and their goods were confiscated. The Jesuits were forced to forfeit their Portuguese citizenship. A series of anti-Catholic laws and decrees followed each other in rapid succession. On 3 November, a law legalizing divorce was passed as well as laws to recognize the legitimacy of children born outside wedlock, authorize cremation, secularize cemeteries, suppress religious teaching in the schools and prohibit the wearing of the cassock. In addition, the ringing of church bells to signal times of worship was subjected to certain restraints, and the public celebration of religious feasts was suppressed. The government also interfered in the running of seminaries, reserving the right to appoint professors and determine curricula. This whole series of laws authored by Afonso Costa culminated in the law of Separation of Church and State, which was passed on 20 April 1911.

The republicans were anticlerical and had a "hostile" approach to the issue of church and state separation, like that of the French Revolution, and the future Mexican Constitution of 1917 and the Spanish Constitution of 1931. On 24 May 1911, Pope Pius X issued the encyclical Iamdudum which condemned the anticlericalism of the new republic for its deprivation of religious civil liberties and the "incredible series of excesses and crimes which has been enacted in Portugal for the oppression of the Church."

The Republic repelled a royalist attack on Chaves in 1912.

== Decline of the Republic ==
In the mid-1920s the national and international political scene was favorable to the emergence of an authoritarian solution, through which a strengthened government could impose public order and restore the political situation. The armed forces, whose political interest had increased due to the First World War and whose leaders had not forgotten that the Portuguese Republican Party had sent them to fight when the military themselves warned that they were not ready to fight, were approaching the conservative forces, which considered the reactionary military as "the last bastion" of order against the chaos that was developing throughout the country.

There were links between conservative politicians and military officials, who added their political and corporate demands to the situation. Finally, on 28 May 1926 the Portuguese Revolution of 1926 took place, a coup d'état by the armed forces supported by almost all the political parties that had given up on their plans to establish a stable government and conferred that mission on the army.

As had happened with the coup d'état of Sidónio Pais in 1917, the population of Lisbon did not try to protect the Republic, and the left parties themselves and their unions refused to resist the coup, allowing authority to pass into the hands of the army. With this began a military dictatorship that would maintain the formal structure of the Republic, but whose authoritarianism would slowly lead to the autocratic regime known as Estado Novo in the year 1932. The Estado Novo would remain in power without interruptions until 1974, when it would be overthrown by the Carnation Revolution and the Third Portuguese Republic would be established.

== Heads of state and government ==
The First Portuguese Republic was an unstable period in the History of Portugal. In a period of 16 years (1910–1926) Portugal had 8 Presidents of the Republic, 1 Provisional Government, 45 Prime Ministers and 1 Constitutional Junta:

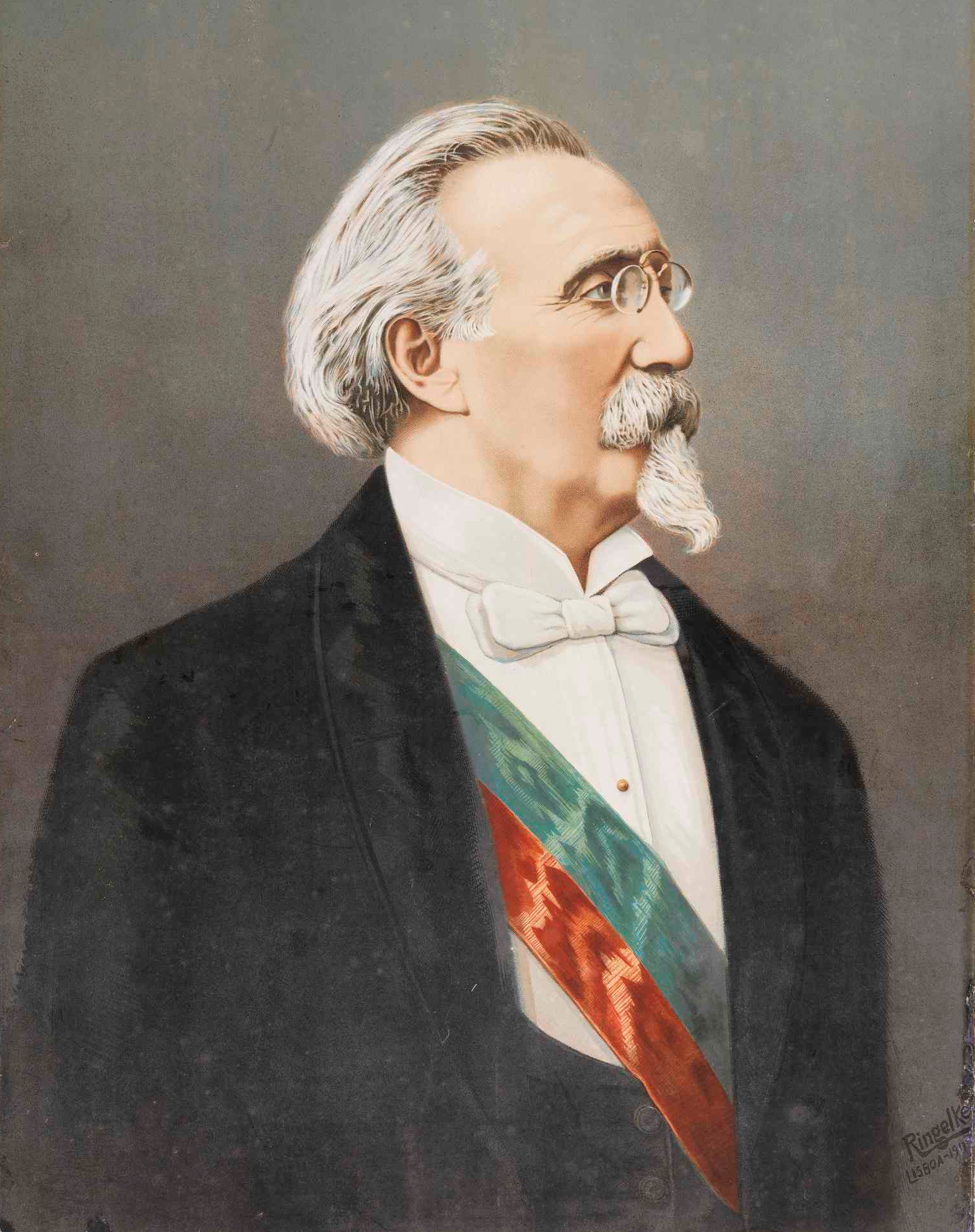
Manuel de Arriaga
(1911–1915)

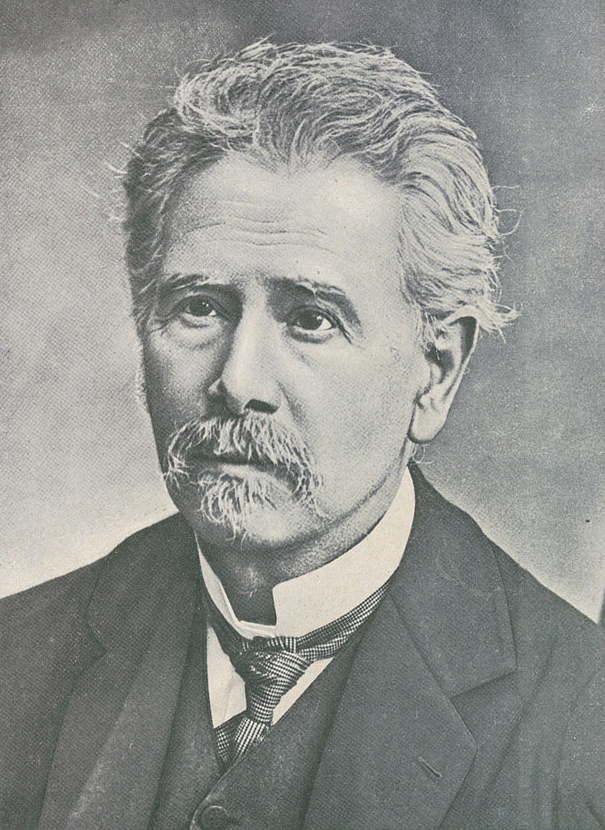
Teófilo Braga
(1915)

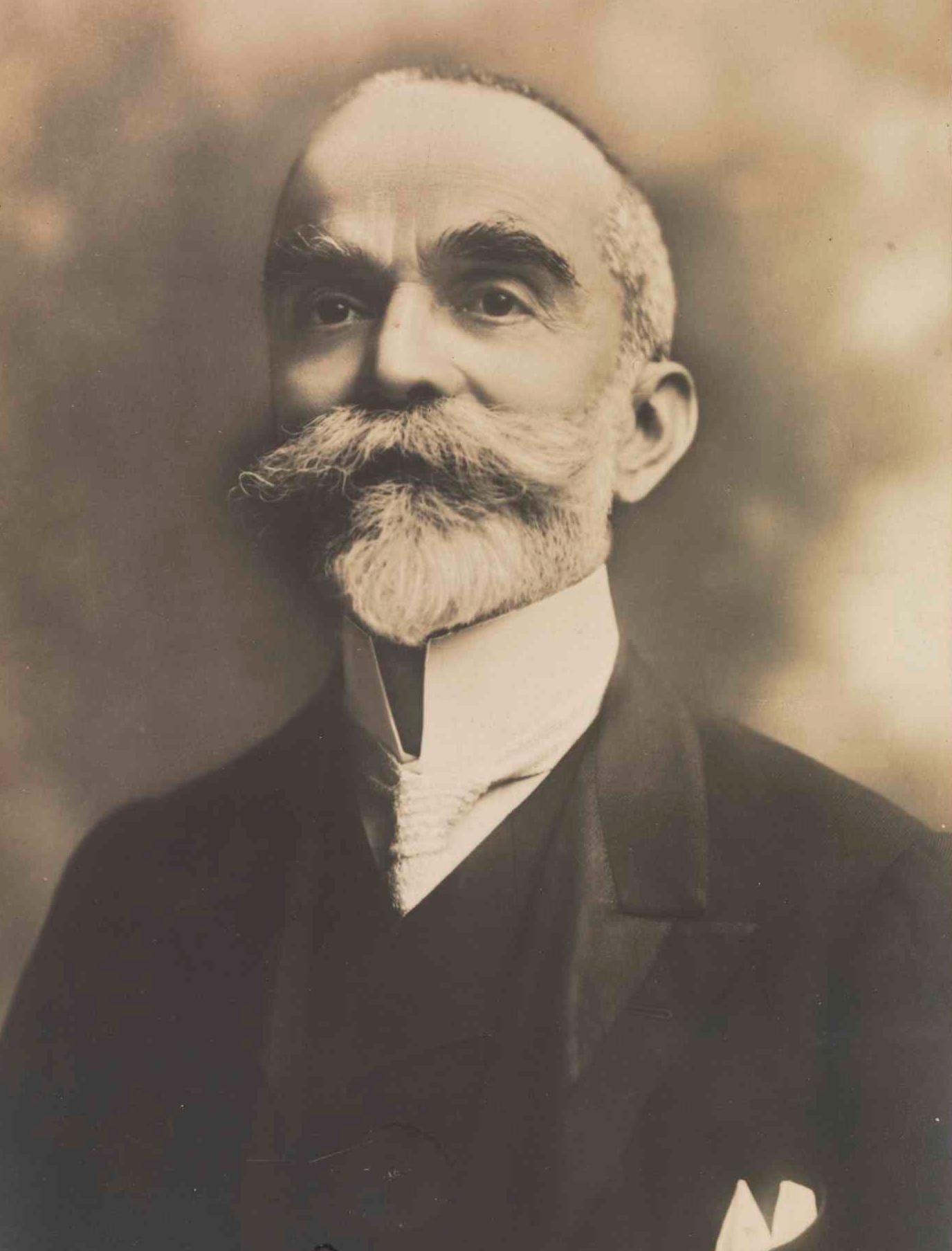
Bernardino Machado
(1915–1917; 1925–1926)

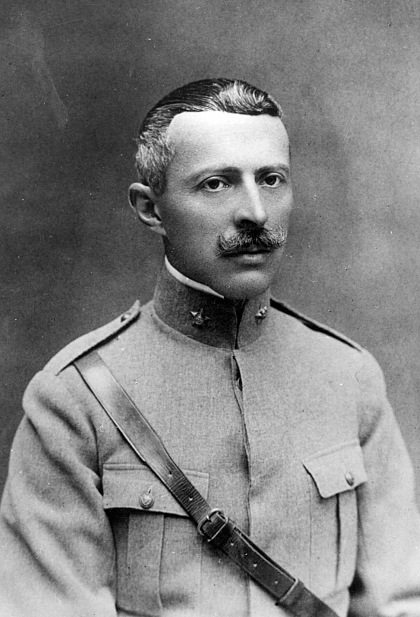
Sidónio Pais
(1918)

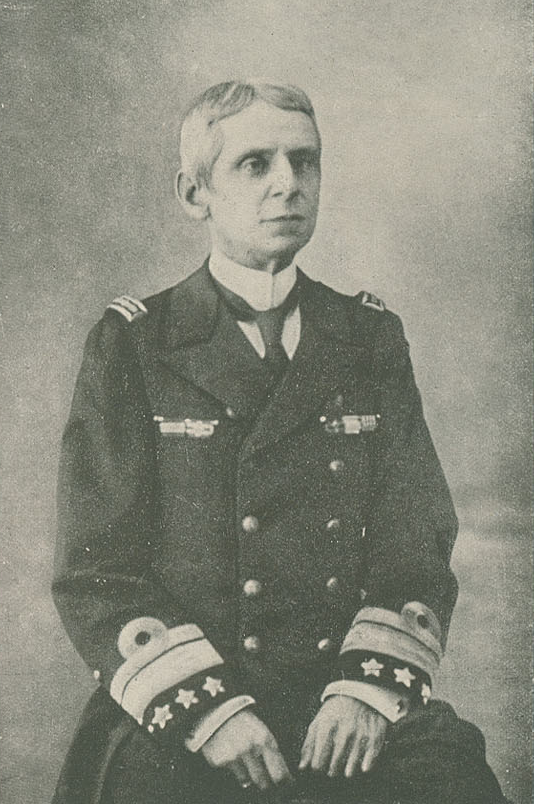
João do Canto e Castro
(1918–1919)

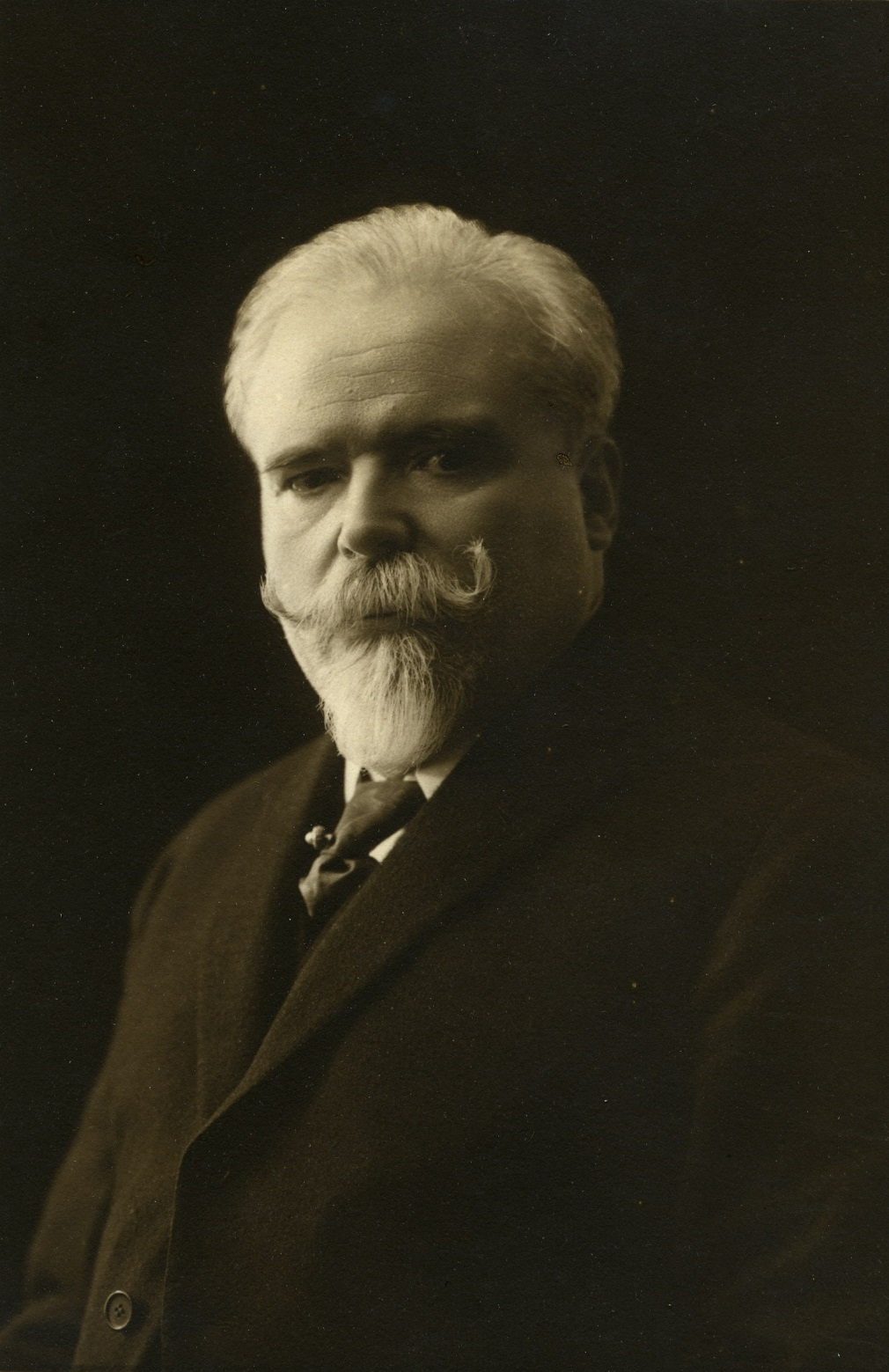
António José de Almeida
(1919–1923)

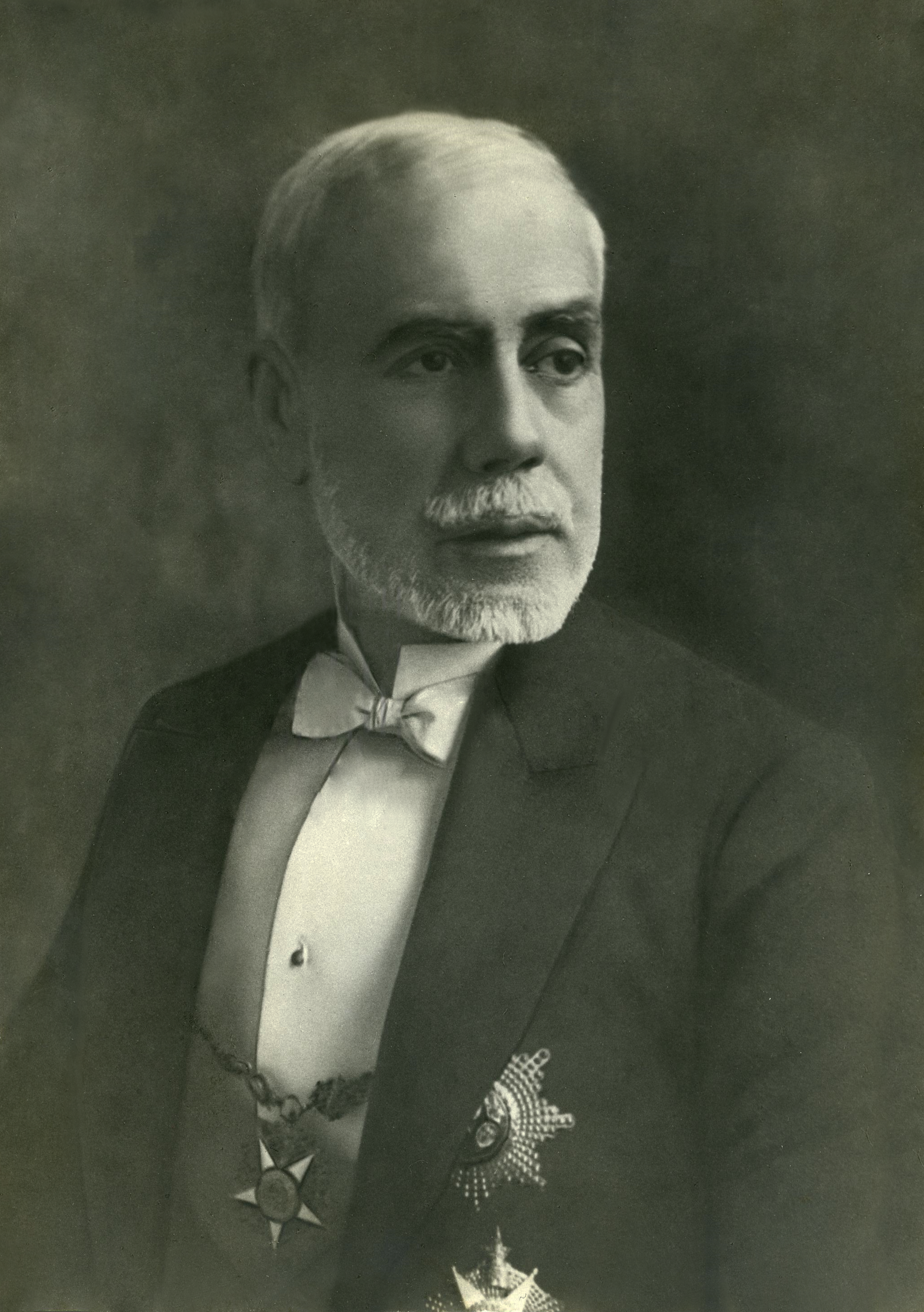
Manuel Teixeira Gomes
(1923–1925)

== Evaluation of the republican experiment and legacy ==
Most historians have emphasized the failure and collapse of the republican dream by the 1920s. José Miguel Sardica in 2011 summarized the consensus of historians:

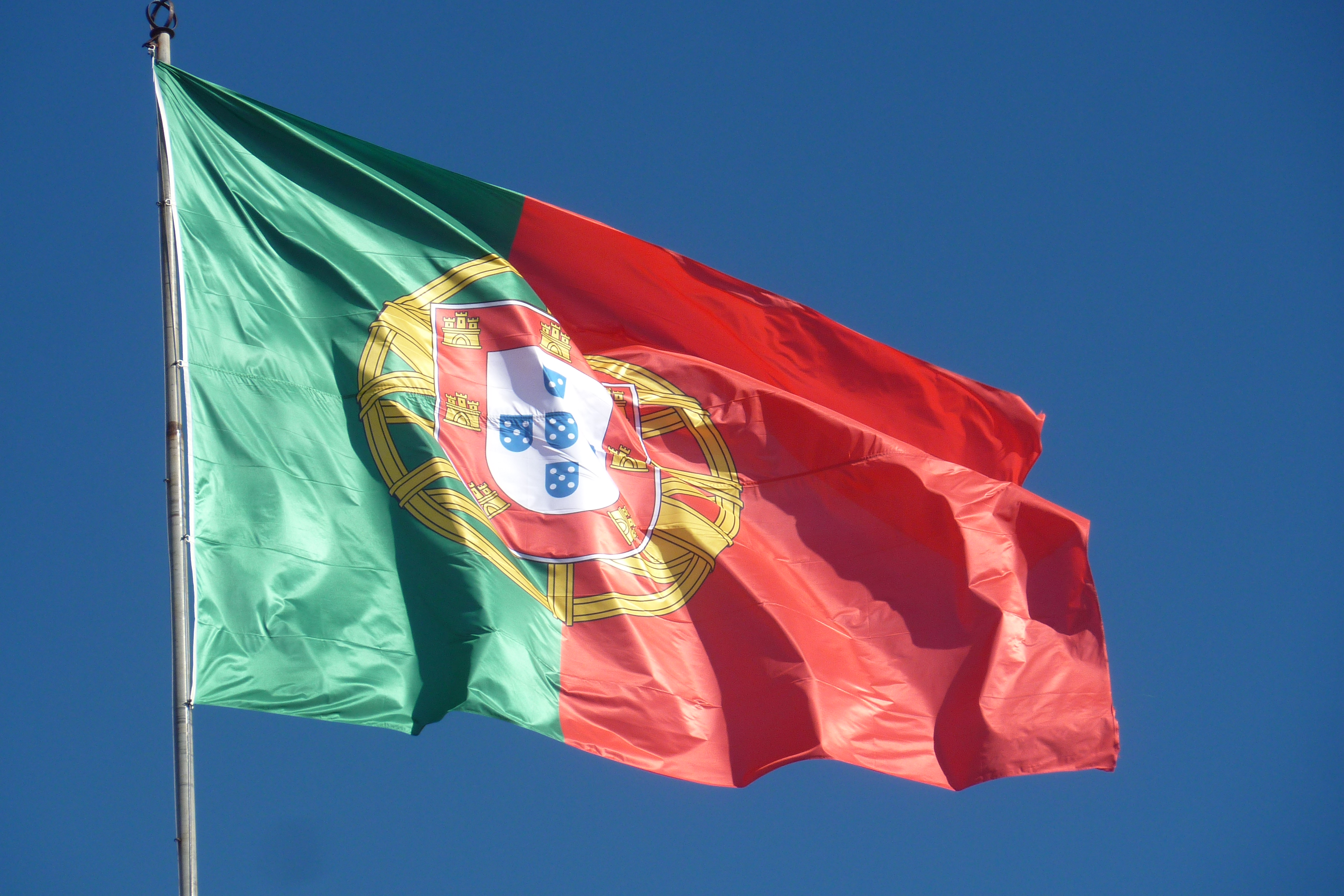
The current Portuguese flag dates back to the First Republic.

"… within a few years, large parts of the key economic forces, intellectuals, opinion-makers and middle classes changed from left to right, trading the unfulfilled utopia of a developing and civic republicanism for notions of "order," "stability" and "security." For many who had helped, supported or simply cheered the Republic in 1910, hoping that the new political situation would repair the monarchy’s flaws (government instability, financial crisis, economic backwardness and civic anomie), the conclusion to be drawn, in the 1920s, was that the remedy for national maladies called for much more than the simple removal of the king … The First Republic collapsed and died as a result of the confrontation between raised hopes and meager deeds."

Sardica, however, also points up the lasting effects of the republican experiment:

"Despite its overall failure, the First Republic endowed twentieth-century Portugal with an insurpassable and enduring legacy—a renewed civil law, the basis for an educational revolution, the principle of separation between State and Church, the overseas empire (only brought to an end in 1975), and a strong symbolic culture whose materializations (the national flag, the national anthem and the naming of streets) still define the present-day collective identity of the Portuguese. The Republic’s prime legacy was indeed that of memory."
