= Republican Liberal Party (Portugal) =

Defunct political party in Portugal

The Republican Liberal Party (Portuguese: Partido Republicano Liberal, PLR) was a political party in Portugal. It was conservative liberal, classical liberal, nationalist and moderately conservative.

== History ==
The party was established in 1919 by a merger of the Evolutionist Party and the Republican Union. The new party emerged as the largest in the 1921 elections, winning 79 of the 163 seats in the House of Representatives and 32 of the 71 seats in the Senate. However, it was beaten by the Democratic Party in the 1922 elections.

In 1923 the party merged with the Reconstitution Party and the National Republican Party to form the Nationalist Republican Party.
