= Republican Union (Portugal) =

Portuguese political party

Republican Union Party Partido da União Republicana
- Abbreviation: PUR
- Leader: Manuel de Brito Camacho
- Founded: 26 February 1912
- Dissolved: 1919
- Split from: Portuguese Republican Party
- Merged into: Republican Liberal Party
- Ideology: Conservatism
- Political position: Center-right

The Republican Union Party (Portuguese: Partido da União Republicana, PUR), commonly known as the Republican Union or the Unionist Party, was a political party in Portugal.

== History ==
The party was established on 26 February 1912 as the result of a split in the National Republican Union (UNR), with one faction breaking away to form the Evolutionist Party and the rump of the UNR becoming the Republican Union. It won 15 seats in the House of Representatives and 11 seats in the Senate in the 1915 parliamentary elections, emerging as the third-largest faction after the Democratic Party.

The party boycotted the 1918 elections, but returned to run in the 1919 elections, in which it won 17 House seats, regaining its place as the third-largest party.

In 1919 the party merged with the Evolutionist Party to form the Republican Liberal Party.
