= Evolutionist Party =

Former Portuguese political party

Republican Evolutionist Party Partido Republicano Evolucionista
- Abbreviation: PRE
- Leader: António José de Almeida
- Founded: 24 February 1912
- Dissolved: 1919
- Split from: Portuguese Republican Party
- Merged into: Republican Liberal Party
- Ideology: Classical Liberalism Conservative Liberalism
- Political position: Center-right

The Republican Evolutionist Party (Portuguese: Partido Republicano Evolucionista, PRE), commonly known as the Evolutionist Party, was a political party in Portugal led by António José de Almeida.

== History ==
The party was established on 24 February 1912 as the result of a split in the Portuguese Republican Party that led to the creation of the PRE, the Democratic Party and the Republican Union. It won 26 seats in the House of Representatives and nine seats in the Senate in the 1915 parliamentary elections, emerging as the second-largest faction after the Democratic Party.

The party boycotted the 1918 elections, but returned to run in the 1919 elections, in which it won 38 House seats, regaining its place as the second-largest party.

After Almeida became president in 1919, the party merged with the Republican Union to form the Republican Liberal Party during the same year.
