= Manuel de Brito Camacho =

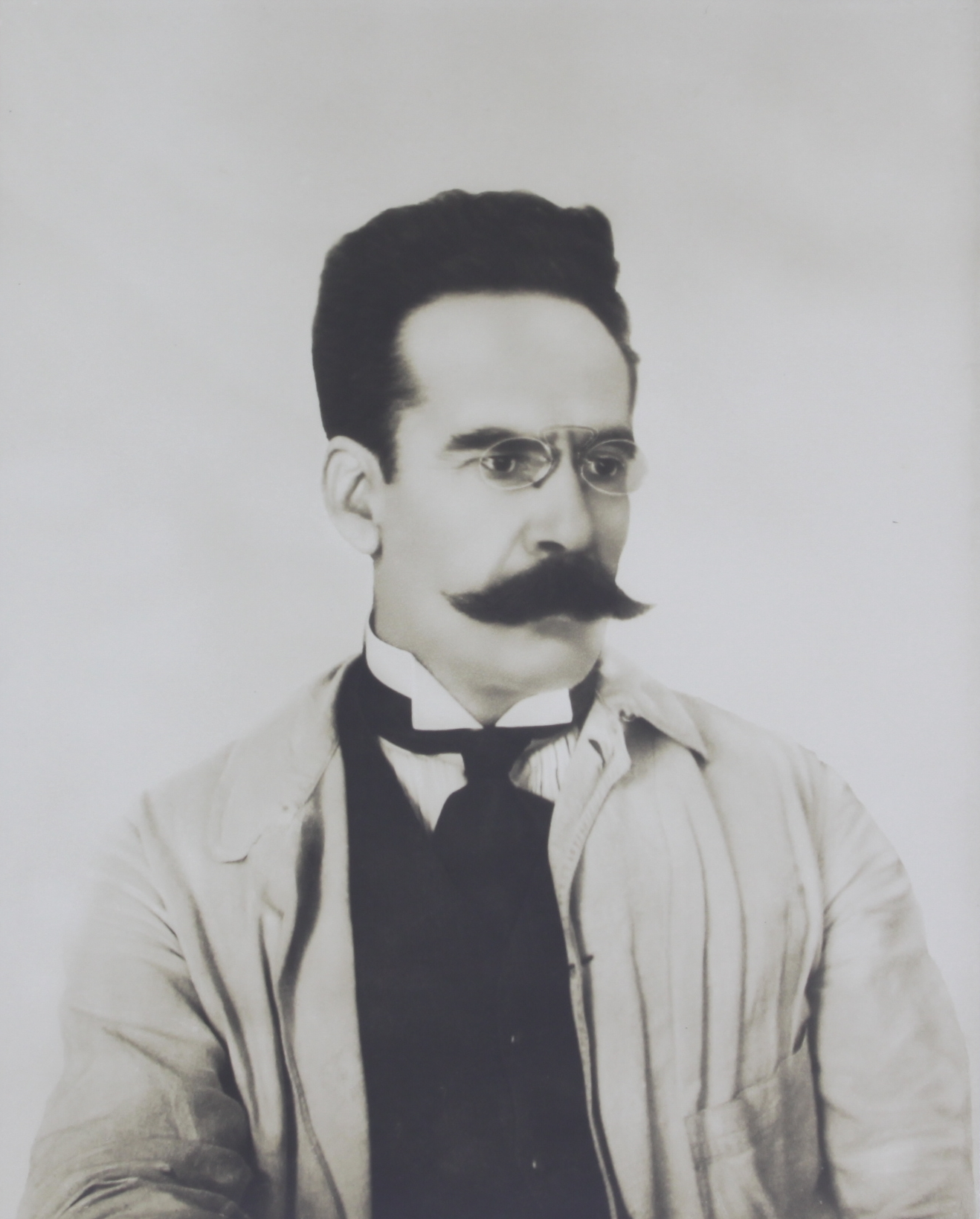

Minister of Public Works, Commerce and Industry
- In office 23 November 1910 – 24 August 1911
- Prime Minister: Teófilo Braga

Minister of Public Works, Commerce and Industry
- In office 4 September 1911 – 13 November 1911
- President: Teófilo Braga
- Prime Minister: João Chagas

Personal details
- Born: Manuel de Brito Camacho; 12 February 1862 Monte das Mesas, Aljustrel
- Died: 19 September 1934 (aged 72) Lisbon
- Resting place: Lisbon
- Party: Portuguese Republican Party; Republican Union Party/Unionist Party; Liberal Republican Party
- Relations: Inocêncio Camacho Rodrigues (half-brother)
- Education: Lisbon Polytechnic School
- Occupation: politician
- Profession: publicist
- Cabinet: Minister of Public Works, Commerce and Industry
- Portfolio: Minister of Public Works, Commerce and Industry

Military service
- Allegiance: Portugal
- Branch/service: Army
- Years of service: 1891-1896
- Rank: Colonel

Manuel de Brito Camacho (12 February 1862, Aljustrel — 19 September 1934, Lisbon) a Portuguese military officer, writer, publicist and politician, who among other positions, was Minister of Public Works, Commerce and Industry (1910–1911) and Republican High Commissioner to Portuguese Mozambique (1921 and 1923). He was the founder of the Partido Unionista (Union Party), and director of the newspaper A Luta (The Struggle), the mouthpiece of the same Party.

== Biography ==
Manuel de Brito Camacho was born on Monte das Mesas, in the vicinity of Rio de Moinhos, a few kilometers from the village of Aljustrel, to a rural family of farmers. He was the half-brother of Inocêncio Camacho Rodrigues, the governor of the Bank of Portugal involved in the scandal caused by the thefts of Alves dos Reis.

After primary studies in Aljustrel (1876–1880), he attended the Beja secondary school, afterward leaving for Lisbon where he attend preparatory studies at the Escola Politécnica, as a ward of uncle in Lisbon. Upon concluding his studies, he entered into the faculty of Medicine in the School of Medical-Surgery of Lisbon, completing his course in 1884, where he began his career in the parish of Torrão, Alcácer do Sal.

In 1891 he joined the Portuguese Army as surgeon-adjunct, and assigned to the military units in Tancos and later Torres Novas, a career that would ultimately make him a colonel.

=== Political career ===
His political career began in the 1893 General Elections, when he was a candidate for the district of Beja on the Republican electoral list. At that time he published Nove de Junho (Ninth of June), which questioned monarchist institutions. Following the election, he was disciplined, suspended for a year and transferred to the 2nd Division in Viseu. Shortly afterward he was reassigned to the Azores for his republican ideals, where he remained for a year.

In 1894, he returned to Viseu, and began regularly contributed as a correspondent, becoming one of the more notable figures in the Republican camp. By 1894 he had founded, with Ricardo Pais Gomes and Ribeiro de Sousa, the magazine O Intransigente (The Intransigent), a Republican publication that criticized the politics and propaganda of the time, which he maintained regularly until June 1895.

From 1896 to 1897 he dedicated himself to publishing and collaboration with other Republican periodicals, and developed in Évora a political action committee, realizing several conferences and commissions.

In 1902 he presented a doctoral thesis in Medicine at the University of Paris, but abandoned his practice definitively as military medic, dedicated himself completely to journalism and politics. He promoted a conference titled A Coroa substituída pelo chapéu de côco (The Crown Substituted by the Bowler Hat), wherein he violently attacked institutional monarchism. Although disconnected with medical practice, he did run for a professorship at the Escola Médico-Cirúrgica de Lisboa (Medical-Surgery School of Lisbon) in 1904.

Brito Camacho founded, with other like-minded Republicans, the magazine A Lucta, which began printing on 11 January 1906. The publication quickly turned into an influential republican source, transforming itself into an official organ of the Partido Unionista (Unionist Party).

=== After the Revolution ===
In elections following the Lisbon Regicide he was elected as Republican deputy, transforming himself in the National Assembly and the press into the principal paladin for the removal of the monarchy (the throne then occupied by young King Manuel II). Camacho was one of the leaders of the movement that created the conditions for the implantation of the First Portuguese Republic on 5 October 1910. In preparation for these events, Brito Camacho was an important connection between the Republican movement and segments of the Army with republican ideals. His political actions and connection with the Republican movement allowed him to mediate during the process of forming the Provisional Government that followed.

On 23 November 1910 he was named the Ministério do Fomento (Minister of Public Works, Commerce and Industry) in the Provisional Government of Teófilo Braga. In this function he was responsible for several reforms, including the division of the Instituto Industrial e Comercial de Lisboa (Lisbon Industrial and Commercial Institute) a Portuguese school of vocational education founded in 1852, to form the engineering school Instituto Superior Técnico (at the University of Lisbon) and the economics/business management school Instituto Superior de Comércio (at the Technical University of Lisbon). On the creation of the Instituto Superior Técnico (IST) he invited Professor Alfredo Bensaúde, to teach the first Engineering classes, today still one of the first specialized engineering programs in the country (for mining, civil, mechanical, electrical and chemical engineering). Courses in these fields were also standardized with a general period of study lasting two-years followed by a three-year period of specialized study. In December 1910 Camacho was responsible for the creation of the Associação de Classe Industrial de Veículos e Artes Correlativas (Association Industrial Vehicle Classes and Associated Arts), the precursor to the Associação Automóvel de Portugal (Automobile Association of Portugal).

Brito Camacho was one of the members of the government, along with Joaquim Teófilo Braga, António José de Almeida, Afonso Costa, José Relvas, António Xavier Correia Barreto, Amaro de Azevedo Gomes and Bernardino Machado, who signed the Law of Separation specifying the separation of Church and State (on 20 April 1911).

In September 1911, in the first post-Revolutionary elections, he was returned to the government benches.

But, as Brito Camacho resumed the directorship of A Lucta, his support for the Portuguese Republican Party had begun to dissolve. He eventually led a faction on the right of the political spectrum whom split from the Republican Party to form the Partido da União Republicana (Republican Union Party), later abbreviated to the Partido Unionista (Unionist Party). The newspaper, A Luta began to function as an organ of the Party. Manuel then began to develop an intense journalistic and political program to counter the hegemony of the Portuguese Republican Party, which was rechristened the Partido Democrático (Democratic Party); the Unionists would assume the role of opposition in successive governments.

In 1918, after the election of António José de Almeida as President, the Unionist and Evolutionist Parties decided to merge, creating the Partido Liberal Republicano (Liberal Republican Party). As a consequence, Brito Camacho slowly reduced his political activity and finally abandoned the leadership of the Party; in his reduced capacity, Brito Camacho even refused the invitation to form a government supported by the Liberal Republican Party.

Between March 1921 and September 1923 he exercised functions as the Republican High-Commissioner in Portuguese Mozambique, taking residence in Lourenço Marques until 1922.

=== Later life ===
Generally, he was a militant republican throughout his life, with an acidic tongue and who was not too popular or respected during his time. His acerbic humor was a reflection of his unhappy upbringing and life. Although he did marry, to an important property-owner's daughter in the region of Aljustrel, his wife died giving birth to their own child, a daughter. The child died shortly after her birth. He was not a humble man, but at the same time he lived a life of austerity and miserly reclusivity, in a home that could pass for an unsuccessful farmer.

Because of his militant atheism, he was commonly forgotten by the regime of the Estado Novo. A close study of his writings makes it difficult to reconcile some of his libertarian ideas. Although Camacho, did promote the national Strike Law which created conflict between the working and bourgeois classes, he did not generally side with one group or the other; he was a defender of all his constituents in the Alentejo, and defended their interests against the central power. His actions in the development of the Crédito Agrícola were due to the development of a policy on cereals, then the Estado Novo concern for the economic development of small and medium-size farms.

In 1925, continuing his role as deputy, he made it clear his interest in abandoning active politics. He continued to promote the defense of the democratic ideals and political stability within the Republic. As a consequence of the 28 May 1926 Revolution, he was forced to abandon politics and retreated into private life.

He died in Lisbon on 19 September 1934.

== Public works ==
Manuel de Brito Camacho was the author of more than thirty volumes of published works, in particular narratives and descriptions of his homeland and life in the rural Baixo Alentejo. The strong presence of rural Alentejan imagery were so common in his works that Aquilino Ribeiro titled his study of the politicians life Brito Camacho nas Letras e no Seu Monte (Brito Camacho in Letters and on His Mountain). In addition to several journalistic writings and political commentaries, Brito Camacho is the author of:

- Impressões de Viagem (1902)
- Contos e sátiras (1920)
- Gente rústica (1921)
- A caminho d'Africa (1923)
- Os amores de Latino Coelho (1923)
- Quadros alemtejanos (1925)
- Moçambique, Problemas Coloniais (1926)
- Jornadas (1927)
- D. Carlos, intimo(1927)
- Gente Vária (1928)
- Cenas da Vida (1929)
- De bom humor (1930)
- Gente bóer (1930)
- Por cerros e vales (1931)
- A Linda Emília (1932)
- Matéria vaga (G1934)
- Política Colonial (1936)
- Rescaldo da guerra (1936)
- Questões nacionais (1937)

== Honors ==
On 29 October 1987, during an official visit, the President of the Republic Mário Soares unveiled a commemorative plaque in Brito Camacho's home in Aljustrel, where he had lived until his death. In 1999, the local school, where the young Manuel had attended, was renamed in his honor (Escola Básica Doutor Brito Camacho).
