= Chamber of Deputies of Portugal (1910–1926) =

Lower chamber of Congress during First Portuguese Republic

Chamber of Deputies of the Portuguese Republic Câmara dos Deputados da República Portuguesa

Type
- Type: Lower house

History
- Founded: 1910
- Disbanded: 1926
- Preceded by: Chamber of Deputies of Portugal (1822-1910)
- Succeeded by: National Assembly (Portugal)

Leadership
- (Final) President of the Chamber of Deputies: António Xavier Correia Barreto
- Seats: 163 (at abolishment)

Elections
- Voting system: Limited Voting

Meeting place
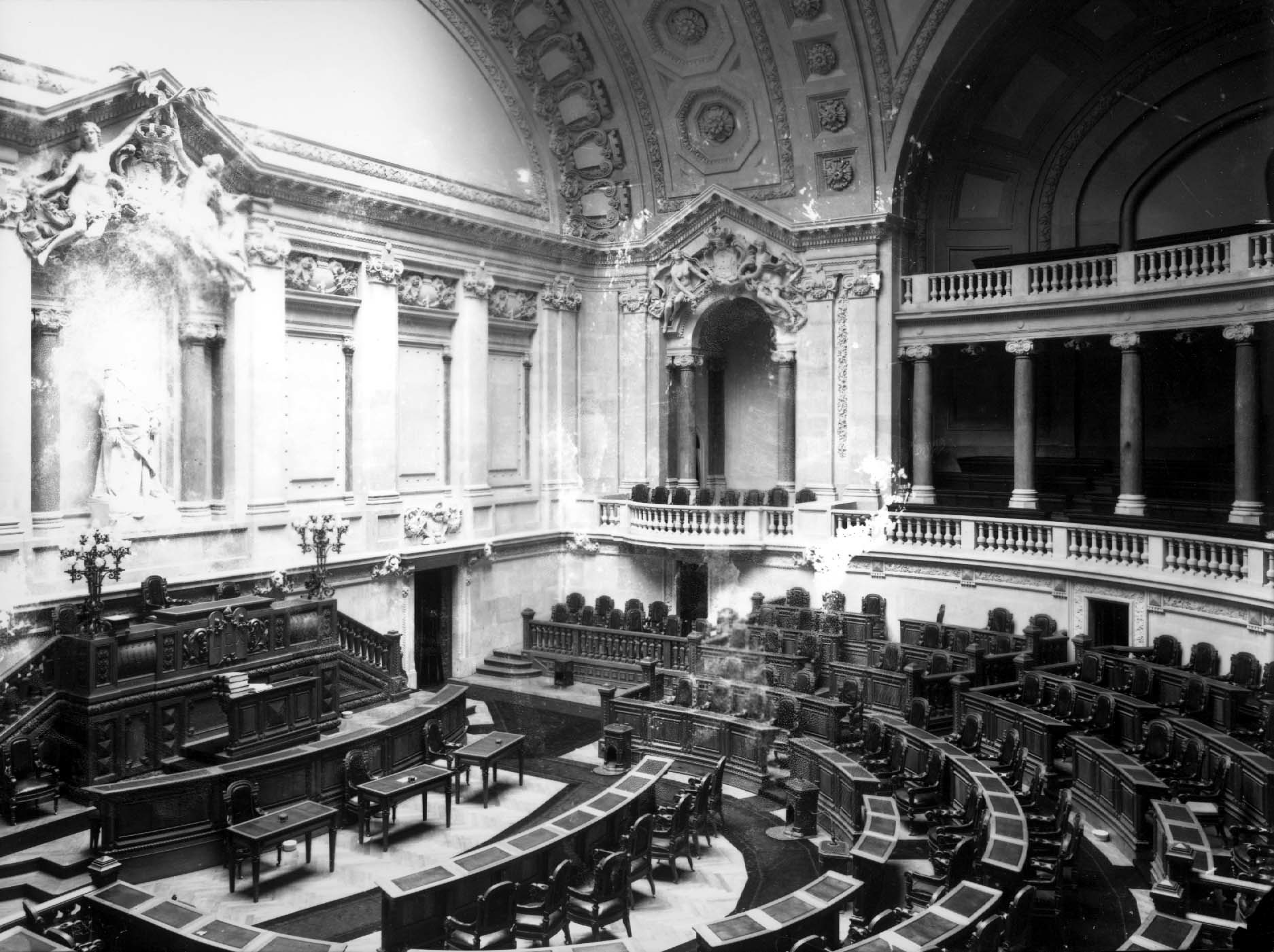
- São Bento Palace; Lisbon, Portugal

The Chamber of Deputies of the Portuguese Republic (Portuguese: Câmara dos Deputados da República Portuguesa), alternatively translatable as the House of Representatives, was the lower house of the Congress of the Republic, the legislature of the First Portuguese Republic. The Chamber of Deputies was elected for a three-year term and had the power to lay taxes, initiate constitutional amendments and legislation regarding the Armed Forces, debate on bills proposed by the Executive, and decide on the extension of the legislative term.
