= List of heads of state of Portugal =

This is a list of heads of state of Portugal from 1139 to the present day.

Between 1139 and 1910, Portugal had a Monarchy system, with all monarchs coming from a single ancestor, Afonso I of Portugal, although the direct lines were cut during the passing of time due to several events. In the almost 800 years of Monarchy, Portugal had four royal houses ruling the country. These houses were:

- House of Burgundy (1139–1383)
- House of Aviz (1385–1580)
- House of Habsburg (1581–1640)
- House of Braganza (1640–1910)

On 5 October 1910, a revolution overthrew the Monarchy and a Republic was implemented. Since then, the Republic has had four distinct phases:

- First Portuguese Republic (1910–1926)
- National Dictatorship (1926–1933)
- Estado Novo (1933–1974)
- Third Portuguese Republic (1974–present)

== Monarchs ==
=== House of Burgundy (1139–1383) ===
The Portuguese House of Burgundy, known as the Afonsine Dynasty, was the founding house of the Kingdom of Portugal. Prior to the independence of Portugal, the house ruled the feudal County of Portugal, of the Kingdom of Galicia. When Alphonso I Henriques declared the independence of Portugal, he turned the family from a comital house to a royal house which would rule Portugal for over two centuries. When Ferdinand I died, a succession crisis occurred and Ferdinand's daughter Beatrice of Portugal was proclaimed queen and her husband John I of Castile proclaimed king by the right of his wife. Her legitimacy as a monarch is disputed.

Name	Lifespan	Reign start	Reign end	Notes	Family	Image
Alphonso I: The Conqueror; The Great; The Founder; Afonso I Henriques	1106/09/11 – 6 December 1185 (aged 73–79)	25 July 1139	6 December 1185	previously Count of Portugal, founder of the Kingdom of Portugal; Son of Henry of Burgundy, Count of Portugal and Teresa of León, Countess of Portugal	Burgundy	
Sancho I: The Populator; Sancho I	11 November 1154 – 26 March 1211 (aged 56)	6 December 1185	26 March 1211	Son of Alphonso I	Burgundy	
Alphonso II: The Fat; Afonso II	23 April 1185 – 25 March 1223 (aged 37)	27 March 1211	25 March 1223	Son of Sancho I	Burgundy	
Sancho II: The Pious; Sancho II	8 September 1209 – 4 January 1248 (aged 38)	26 March 1223	4 December 1247	Son of Alphonso II	Burgundy	
Alphonso III: The Boulonnais; Afonso III	5 May 1210 – 16 February 1279 (aged 68)	4 January 1248	16 February 1279	Son of Alphonso II; Brother of Sancho II	Burgundy	
Denis I: The Farmer; The Poet; Portuguese: Dinis I	9 October 1261 – 7 January 1325 (aged 63)	6 February 1279	7 January 1325	Son of Alphonso III	Burgundy	
Alphonso IV: The Brave; Afonso IV	8 February 1291 – 28 May 1357 (aged 66)	7 January 1325	28 May 1357	Son of Denis I	Burgundy	
Peter I: The Just; The Cruel; Portuguese: Pedro I	8 April 1320 – 18 January 1367 (aged 46)	28 May 1357	18 January 1367	Son of Alphonso IV	Burgundy	
Ferdinand I: The Handsome; Portuguese: Fernando I	31 October 1345 – 22 October 1383 (aged 37)	18 January 1367	22 October 1383	Son of Peter I	Burgundy	
Beatrice: Portuguese: Beatriz	7–13 February 1373 – c. 1420 (aged 46–47)	(Disputed) 1383	(Disputed) 1385	Daughter of Ferdinand I	Burgundy	

=== House of Aviz (1385–1580) ===
The House of Aviz, known as the Joanine Dynasty, succeeded the House of Burgundy as the reigning house of the Kingdom of Portugal. The house was founded by John I of Portugal, who was the Grand Master of the Order of Aviz. When King John II of Portugal died without an heir, the throne of Portugal passed to his cousin, Manuel, Duke of Beja. When King Sebastian of Portugal died, the throne passed to his uncle, Henry of Portugal (he might be called Henry II because Henry, Count of Portugal, father of Alphonso I of Portugal, was the first of that name to rule Portugal). When Henry died, a succession crisis occurred and António, Prior of Crato, was proclaimed António of Portugal.

Name	Lifespan	Reign start	Reign end	Notes	Family	Image
John I: Of Good Memory; The Good; The Great; The Bastard; Portuguese: João I	11 April 1357 – 14 August 1433 (aged 75)	6 April 1385	14 August 1433	Illegitimate son of Peter I	Aviz	
Edward: The Philosopher-King; The Eloquent; Portuguese: Duarte I	31 October 1391 – 9 September 1438 (aged 46)	14 August 1433	9 September 1438	Son of John I	Aviz	
Alphonso V: The African; Afonso V	15 January 1432 – 28 August 1481 (aged 49)	13 September 1438 — 15 November 1477	11 November 1477 — 28 August 1481	Son of Edward I	Aviz	
John II: The Perfect Prince; Portuguese: João II	3 March 1455 – 25 October 1495 (aged 40)	11 November 1477 — 28 August 1481	15 November 1477 — 25 October 1495	Son of Alphonso V	Aviz	
Emmanuel I: The Fortunate; Manuel I	31 May 1469 – 13 December 1521 (aged 52)	25 October 1495	13 December 1521	Cousin of John II; Grandson of Edward I	Aviz	
John III: The Colonizer; The Pious; Portuguese: João III	7 June 1502 – 11 June 1557 (aged 55)	13 December 1521	11 June 1557	Son of Emmanuel I	Aviz	
Sebastian: The Desired; The Asleep; The Hidden; Portuguese: Sebastião	20 January 1554 – 4 August 1578 (aged 24)	11 June 1557	4 August 1578	Grandson of John III	Aviz	
Henry I: The Cardinal-King; The Chaste; Portuguese: Henrique I	31 January 1512 – 31 January 1580 (aged 68)	4 August 1578	31 January 1580	Son of Emmanuel I Great-uncle of Sebastian	Aviz	
Anthony: The Resistant; Portuguese: António	1531 – 28 August 1595 (aged 64)	(Disputed) 24 July 1580	(Disputed) 1583	Grandson of Emmanuel I	Aviz	

=== House of Habsburg (1581–1640) ===
The House of Habsburg, known as the Philippine Dynasty, is the house that ruled Portugal from 1581 to 1640. The dynasty began with the acclamation of Philip II of Spain as Philip I of Portugal in 1580, officially recognized in 1581 by the Portuguese Cortes of Tomar. Philip I swore to rule Portugal as a kingdom separate from his Spanish domains, under the personal union known as the Iberian Union.

Name	Lifespan	Reign start	Reign end	Notes	Family	Image
Philip I: The Prudent; Portuguese: Filipe I	21 May 1527 – 13 September 1598 (aged 71)	17 April 1581	13 September 1598	Grandson of Emmanuel I	Habsburg	King Philip I
Philip II: The Pious; Portuguese: Filipe II	14 April 1578 – 31 March 1621 (aged 42)	13 September 1598	31 March 1621	Son of Philip I	Habsburg	King Philip II
Philip III: The Great; The Oppressor; Portuguese: Filipe III	8 April 1605 – 17 September 1665 (aged 60)	31 March 1621	1 December 1640	Son of Philip II	Habsburg	King Philip II

=== House of Braganza (1640–1910) ===
The House of Braganza, also known as the Brigantine Dynasty, came to power in 1640, when John II, Duke of Braganza, claimed to be the rightful heir of the defunct House of Aviz, as he was the great great grandson of King Manuel I. John was proclaimed King John IV, and he deposed the House of Habsburg in the Portuguese Restoration War.

The descendants of Queen Maria II and her consort, King Ferdinand II (a German prince of the House of Saxe-Coburg and Gotha), came to rule in 1853. Portuguese law and custom treated them as members of the House of Braganza, though they were still Saxe-Coburg and Gotha dynasts. This has led some to classify these last four monarchs of Portugal as members of a new royal family, called the House of Braganza-Saxe-Coburg and Gotha, though this view is not widely held.

Name	Lifespan	Reign start	Reign end	Notes	Family	Image
John IV: The Restorer; Portuguese: João IV	19 March 1604 – 6 November 1656 (aged 53)	1 December 1640	6 November 1656	Great-great-grandson of Emmanuel I	Braganza	
Alphonso VI: The Victorious; Afonso VI	21 August 1643 – 12 September 1683 (aged 40)	6 November 1656	12 September 1683	Son of John IV	Braganza	
Peter II: The Pacific; Portuguese: Pedro II	26 April 1648 – 9 December 1706 (aged 58)	6 November 1683	9 December 1706	Son of John IV; Brother of Afonso VI	Braganza	
John V: The Magnanimous; The Portuguese Sun-King; Portuguese: João V	22 October 1689 – 31 July 1750 (aged 60)	9 December 1706	31 July 1750	Son of Peter II	Braganza	
Joseph I: The Reformer; Portuguese: José I	6 June 1714 – 24 February 1777 (age 62)	31 July 1750	24 February 1777	Son of John V	Braganza	
Mary I: The Pious; The Mad; Portuguese: Maria I	17 December 1734 – 20 March 1816 (aged 81)	24 February 1777	20 March 1816	Daughter of Joseph I	Braganza	
Peter III: The Builder; The Sacristan; The Enabler; Portuguese: Pedro III	5 July 1717 – 25 May 1786 (aged 68)	24 February 1777	25 May 1786	Husband of Mary I Son of John V jure uxoris king	Braganza	
John VI: The Clement; Portuguese: João VI	13 May 1767 – 10 March 1826 (aged 58)	20 March 1816	10 March 1826	Son of Mary I and Peter III	Braganza	
Peter IV: The Soldier King; The Liberator; Portuguese: Pedro IV	12 October 1798 – 24 September 1834 (aged 35)	10 March 1826	2 May 1826	Son of John VI	Braganza	
Mary II: The Educator; The Good Mother; Portuguese: Maria II	4 April 1819 – 15 November 1853 (aged 34)	2 May 1826	23 June 1828	Daughter of Peter IV	Braganza	
Michael I: The Absolutist; The Traditionalist; The Usurper; Portuguese: Miguel I	26 October 1802 – 14 November 1866 (aged 64)	26 February 1828	6 May 1834	Son of John VI	Braganza	
Mary II: The Educator; The Good Mother; Portuguese: Maria II	4 April 1819 – 15 November 1853 (aged 34)	26 May 1834	15 November 1853	Daughter of Peter IV	Braganza	
Ferdinand II: The Artist King; Portuguese: Fernando II	29 October 1816 – 15 December 1885 (aged 69)	16 September 1837	15 November 1853	Husband of Mary II jure uxoris king	Saxe-Coburg-Gotha-Koháry	
Peter V: The Hopeful; Portuguese: Pedro V	16 September 1837 – 11 November 1861 (aged 24)	15 November 1853	11 November 1861	Son of Mary II and Ferdinand II	Braganza/Braganza-Saxe-Coburg and Gotha	
Louis I: The Popular; Portuguese: Luís I	31 October 1838 – 19 October 1889 (aged 50)	11 November 1861	19 October 1889	Son of Mary II and Ferdinand II	Braganza/Braganza-Saxe-Coburg and Gotha	
Charles I: The Diplomat; The Martyr; Portuguese: Carlos	28 September 1863 – 1 February 1908 (aged 44)	19 October 1889	1 February 1908	Son of Louis I	Braganza/Braganza-Saxe-Coburg and Gotha	
Emmanuel II: The Sorrowful; The Unfortunate; The Patriot; Portuguese: Manuel II	15 November 1889 – 2 July 1932 (aged 42)	1 February 1908	5 October 1910	Son of Charles I Last King of Portugal.	Braganza/Braganza-Saxe-Coburg and Gotha	

== Presidents ==
The complete list of presidents of the Portuguese Republic consists of the 20 heads of state in the history of Portugal since the 5 October 1910 revolution that installed a republican regime. This list includes not only those persons who were sworn into office as President of Portugal but also those who de facto served as head of state since 1910.

Republican
Democratic
National Republican
Evolutionist Party/Republican Liberal
National Union/Popular National Action
Democratic Renewal
Socialist
Social Democratic
Independent
Interim holder

=== First Republic (1910–1926) ===
No.	Portrait	President (Lifespan)	Term of office			Election	Party	Ref.
No.	Portrait	President (Lifespan)	Start	End	Duration	Election	Party	Ref.
-		Teófilo Braga (Note: Teófilo Braga served as President of the Provisional Government, the de facto head of government and head of state, from the republican revolution of 1910 to the election of Manuel de Arriaga, the 1st President of Portugal.) (1843–1924)	5 October 1910	24 August 1911	333 days	—	Republican	
Presidents of the Republic (1911–1926)
1		Manuel de Arriaga (1840–1917)	24 August 1911	26 May 1915^{[R]}	3 years, 278 days	1911	Republican later Democratic	
2		Teófilo Braga (1843–1924)	29 May 1915	5 October 1915	129 days	May; 1915	Democratic	
3		Bernardino Machado (1851–1944)	5 October 1915	5 December 1917^{[C]}	2 years, 60 days	August; 1915	Democratic	
-		Ministry (Head of State ex officio); President: Sidónio Pais	12 December 1917	28 April 1918	137 days	—	Independent	
4		Sidónio Pais (Note: After leading a coup d'état, Sidónio Pais became President of the Revolutionary Junta and later Prime Minister (President of the Ministry). He then abolished the post of Prime Minister, assuming himself as the head of government as President of the Republic. He was assassinated in 1918.) (1872–1918)	28 April 1918	14 December 1918^{[A]}	230 days	April; 1918	National Republican	
-		Ministry (Head of State ex officio); President: João do Canto e Castro	14 December 1918	16 December 1918	2 days	—	National Republican	
5		João do Canto e Castro (Note: Canto e Castro was head of the Council of Ministers that served as the head of state of Portugal after the assassination of Sidónio Pais in 1918, from December 14 to December 16. He then became interim president until the election of António José de Almeida.) (1862–1934)	16 December 1918	5 October 1919	293 days	December; 1918	National Republican	
6		António José de Almeida (1866–1929)	5 October 1919	5 October 1923	4 years	1919	Evolutionist later Republican Liberal	
7		Manuel Teixeira Gomes (1860–1941)	5 October 1923	11 December 1925^{[R]}	2 year, 67 days	1923	Democratic	
8		Bernardino Machado (1851–1944); 2nd time	11 December 1925	31 May 1926^{[C]}	171 days	1925	Democratic	

=== Second Republic (1926–1974) ===
No.	Portrait	President (Lifespan)	Term of office			Election	Party	Ref.
No.	Portrait	President (Lifespan)	Start	End	Duration	Election	Party	Ref.
Ditadura Nacional (National Dictatorship) (1926–1932)
9		José Mendes Cabeçadas (Note: Mendes Cabeçadas, Gomes da Costa and Óscar Carmona were the heads of the revolutionary provisional governments during the year of 1926. Although not called Presidents, they were de facto heads of state.) (1883–1965)	31 May 1926	17 June 1926^{[C]}	17 days	—	Independent	
-		Ministry (Head of State ex officio); President: Manuel Gomes da Costa	17 June 1926	29 June 1926	12 days	—	Independent	
10		Manuel Gomes da Costa (1863–1929)	29 June 1926	9 July 1926^{[C]}	10 days	—	Independent	
-		Ministry (Head of State ex officio); President: Óscar Carmona	9 July 1926	16 November 1926	130 days	—	Independent	
11		Óscar Carmona (Note: Óscar Carmona served initially as head of the revolutionary government after a counter-coup deposed Gomes da Costa. He was de facto head of state between July 9 and November 16, 1926. However he officially took office as President of the Republic on November 16, 1926. Six years later, in 1932, the Estado Novo was proclaimed and the National Union, the only legal party, was formed by António de Oliveira Salazar. Carmona joined the party and was the party's candidate for every presidential election (that were considered fraudulent) until 1951, when he died.) (1869–1951)	16 November 1926	15 April 1928	1 year, 149 days	—	Independent from 1932; National Union	
11	Estado Novo (New State) (1932–1974)						Independent from 1932; National Union	
11		Óscar Carmona (1869–1951)	15 April 1928	18 April 1951^{[D]}	22 years, 362 days	1928 1935 1942 1949	Independent from 1932; National Union	
-		António de Oliveira Salazar (Note: António de Oliveira Salazar, the dictatorial President of the Council of Ministers (a position roughly equivalent to the modern post of Prime Minister) occupied the post of president interim between the death of Óscar Carmona and the election of Francisco Craveiro Lopes.) (1889–1970) (interim)	18 April 1951	21 July 1951	93 days	—	National Union	
12		Francisco Craveiro Lopes (1894–1964)	21 July 1951	9 August 1958	7 years, 19 days	1951	National Union	
13		Américo Tomás (1894–1987)	9 August 1958	25 April 1974^{[C]}	15 years, 259 days	1958 1965 1972	National Union from 1970; People's National Action	

=== Third Republic (1974–present) ===
No.	Portrait	President (Lifespan)	Term of office			Election	Party	Ref.
No.	Portrait	President (Lifespan)	Start	End	Duration	Election	Party	Ref.
Presidents appointed in the aftermath of the Carnation Revolution (1974–1976)
-	National Salvation Junta (Note: Between the Carnation Revolution on April 25, 1974 and May 15 of the same year, António de Spínola was the head of the National Salvation Junta, being the de facto head of state and government. After May 15 Adelino da Palma Carlos became the Prime Minister, and Spínola continued as de jure head of state as President of the Republic.); President: António de Spínola		25 April 1974	15 May 1974	20 days	—	Independent	
14		António de Spínola (1910–1996)	15 May 1974	30 September 1974^{[R]}	138 days	—	Independent	
15		Francisco da Costa Gomes (1914–2001)	30 September 1974	14 July 1976	1 year, 288 days	—	Independent	
Presidents elected under the Constitution of the Republic (1976–present)
16		António Ramalho Eanes (born 1935)	14 July 1976	9 March 1986	9 years, 238 days	1976 1980	Independent from 1985; Democratic Renewal	
17		Mário Soares (1924–2017)	9 March 1986	9 March 1996	10 years	1986 1991	Socialist	
18		Jorge Sampaio (1939–2021)	9 March 1996	9 March 2006	10 years	1996 2001	Socialist	
19		Aníbal Cavaco Silva (born 1939)	9 March 2006	9 March 2016	10 years	2006 2011	Social Democratic (Note: Party member that suspended his membership during his term in office.)	
20		Marcelo Rebelo de Sousa (born 1948)	9 March 2016	9 March 2026	10 years	2016 2021	Social Democratic (Note: Party member that suspended his membership during his term in office.)	
21		António José Seguro (born 1962)	9 March 2026	Incumbent	151 days	2026	Socialist	

== See also ==
- List of Portuguese royal consorts
- List of titles and honours of the Portuguese Crown
- Style of the Portuguese sovereign
- President of Portugal
- First Lady of Portugal
- List of prime ministers of Portugal
- Politics of Portugal
- History of Portugal

== Notes ==
^{[A]} Assassinated.
^{[D]} Died in office of natural causes.
^{[R]} Resigned.
^{[C]} Forced to resign due to a coup d'état.
