= 1955 in Portugal =

- Decades: 1930s; 1940s; 1950s; 1960s; 1970s
- See also: History of Portugal; Timeline of Portuguese history; List of years in Portugal

Events in the year 1955 in Portugal.

== Incumbents ==
- President: Francisco Craveiro Lopes
- Prime Minister: António de Oliveira Salazar (National Union)

== Events ==
- United Nations Security Council Resolution 109: Portugal and several other countries are admitted to membership to the United Nations

== Sports ==
- AD Fundão founded
- Liga Feminina de Basquetebol founded

== Births ==
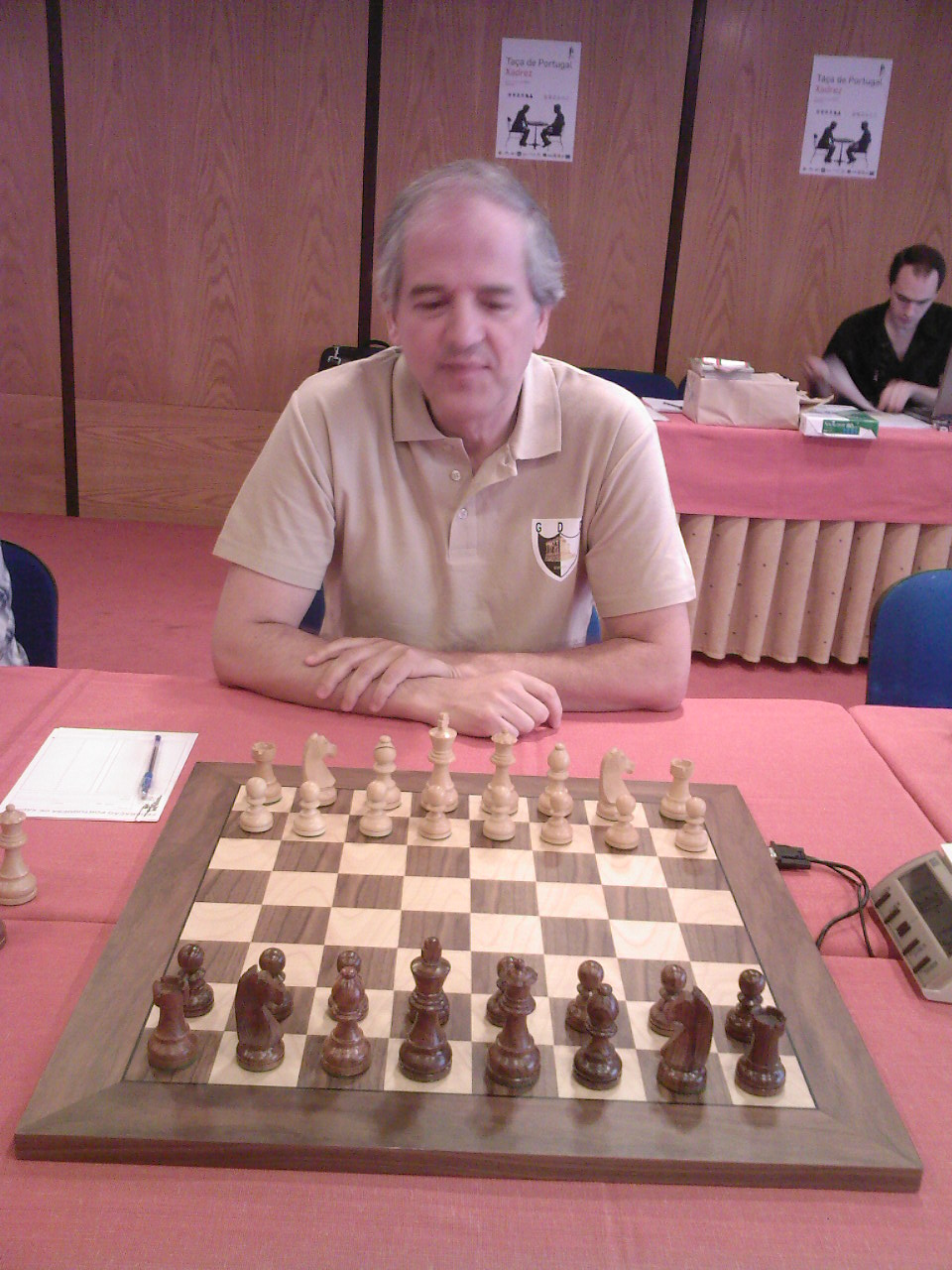
Luís Santos in 2006

- 27 January – Maria do Carmo Seabra, politician
- 28 February – Rui Reininho, singer
- 30 June – Luís Santos, chess player and International Correspondence Chess Grandmaster
- 25 July – Miguel Esteves Cardoso, writer, translator, critic and journalist
- 29 August – Francisco Lopes, politician
- 1 November – Amarilis de Varennes, academic

== Deaths ==
- 3 January – José Norton de Matos, military officer and politician (born 1867)
- 27 June
  - Victor Hugo de Azevedo Coutinho, politician, Prime Minister 1914–15 (born 1871)
  - Artur de Oliveira Santos, journalist and local politician (born 1884)
- 27 November – Luís de Freitas Branco, composer (born 1890)
- 13 December – António Egas Moniz, neurologist, winner of the Nobel Prize for Physiology or Medicine (1949) (born 1874).
