= 1957 in Portugal =

- Decades: 1930s; 1940s; 1950s; 1960s; 1970s
- See also: History of Portugal; Timeline of Portuguese history; List of years in Portugal

Events in the year 1957 in Portugal.

== Incumbents ==
- President: Francisco Craveiro Lopes
- Prime Minister: António de Oliveira Salazar (National Union)

== Events ==
- 4 November – Portuguese legislative election, 1957.

== Sports ==
- SC Melgacense founded

== Births ==
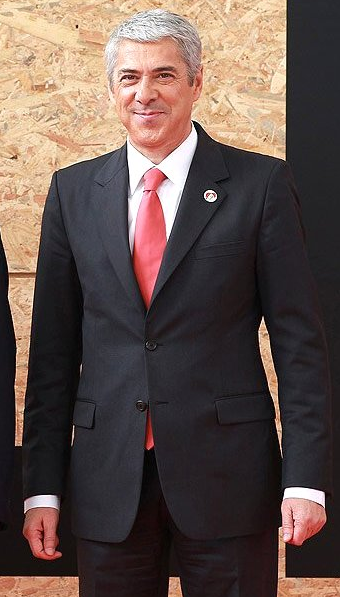
José Sócrates

- 6 September – José Sócrates, prime minister

== Deaths ==
- 24 December – Domingos Oliveira, politician, military officer (born 1873)
