= 1952 in Portugal =

- Decades: 1930s; 1940s; 1950s; 1960s; 1970s
- See also: History of Portugal; Timeline of Portuguese history; List of years in Portugal

Events in the year 1952 in Portugal.

== Incumbents ==
- President: Francisco Craveiro Lopes
- Prime Minister: António de Oliveira Salazar (National Union)

== Events ==
- 31 March – Gibalta rail accident
- 1 July – The Portuguese Air Force founded

== Sports ==
- 14 to 25 February – Portugal had one participant at the 1952 Winter Olympics, where Duarte Silva competed in downhill skiing. It was the first time that Portugal participated in the Winter Olympic Games.

== Births ==
- 20 February – João Calvão da Silva, politician (d. 2018)
- 4 June - Adelino Teixeira, football coach and former footballer

== Deaths ==
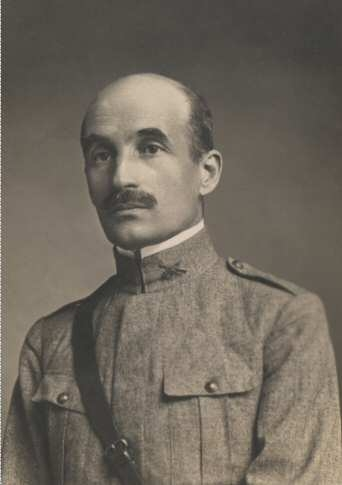
José Vicente de Freitas

- 6 September – José Vicente de Freitas, military officer and politician (born in 1869)
