= 1958 in Portugal =

- Decades: 1930s; 1940s; 1950s; 1960s; 1970s
- See also: History of Portugal; Timeline of Portuguese history; List of years in Portugal

Events in the year 1958 in Portugal.

== Incumbents ==
- President: Francisco Craveiro Lopes (until 9 August); Américo Tomás (from 9 August)
- Prime Minister: António de Oliveira Salazar (National Union)

== Events ==
- 8 June – Portuguese presidential election, 1958.
- TACV Cabo Verde Airlines founded

== Sports ==
- 1958 Portuguese Grand Prix
- AD Fafe founded
- G.D. Riopele founded
- Establishment of the Campeonato Português de Rugby.

== Births ==
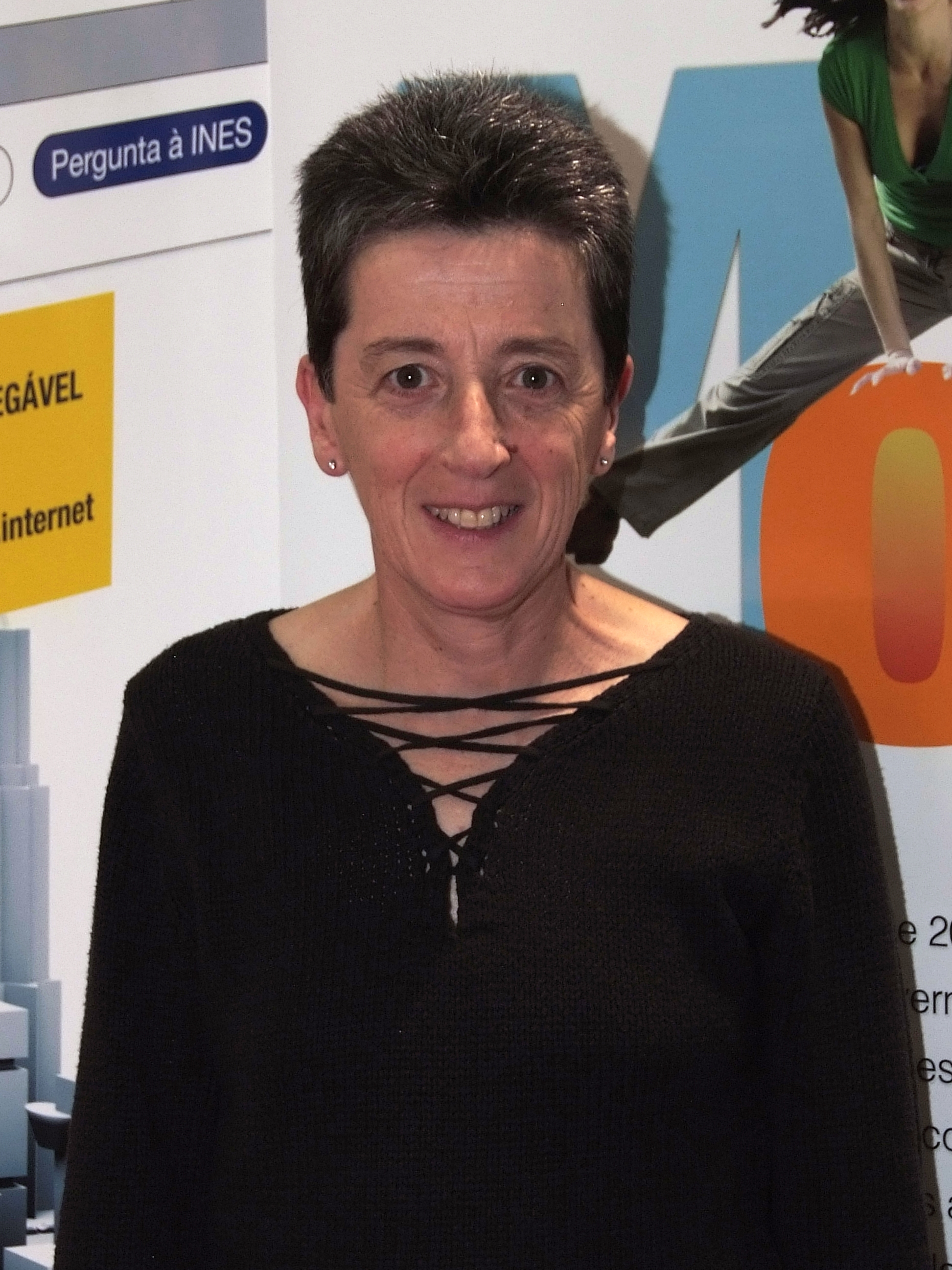
Rosa Mota, Olympic champion 1988

- 29 June – Rosa Mota, runner.

== Deaths ==
- 3 March – Emílio Lino, fencer (born 1916).
- 16 August – José Domingues dos Santos, politician, jurist, professor and journalist (born 1885)
