= 1970 in Portugal =

- Decades: 1950s; 1960s; 1970s; 1980s; 1990s
- See also: History of Portugal; Timeline of Portuguese history; List of years in Portugal

Events in the year 1970 in Portugal.

== Incumbents ==
- President: Américo Tomás
- Prime Minister: Marcelo Caetano (National Union/People's National Action)

== Events ==
- 22 November – Operation Green Sea, an attack on Conakry, the capital of Guinea

=== Undated ===
- Operation Gordian Knot, a military campaign in Portuguese Mozambique, part of the Portuguese Colonial War (1961–1974).
- The Portuguese Workers' Communist Party, a Maoist political party, founded

== Births ==
- 26 April - Isabel Jesus, rower

== Deaths ==
- 26 April – Francisco Cunha Leal, politician (born 1888)
- 3 June – Aníbal Milhais, the most decorated Portuguese soldier of World War I (born 1895).
- 27 July – António de Oliveira Salazar, professor and politician (born 1889)
- 22 November – Casimiro de Oliveira, racing driver (born 1907)
