= 1964 in Portugal =

- Decades: 1940s; 1950s; 1960s; 1970s; 1980s
- See also: History of Portugal; Timeline of Portuguese history; List of years in Portugal

Events in the year 1964 in Portugal.

== Incumbents ==
- President: Américo Tomás
- Prime Minister: António de Oliveira Salazar (National Union)

== Events ==
- 18 July – Madeira Airport opened

== Sports ==
- UD Nordeste founded

== Births ==
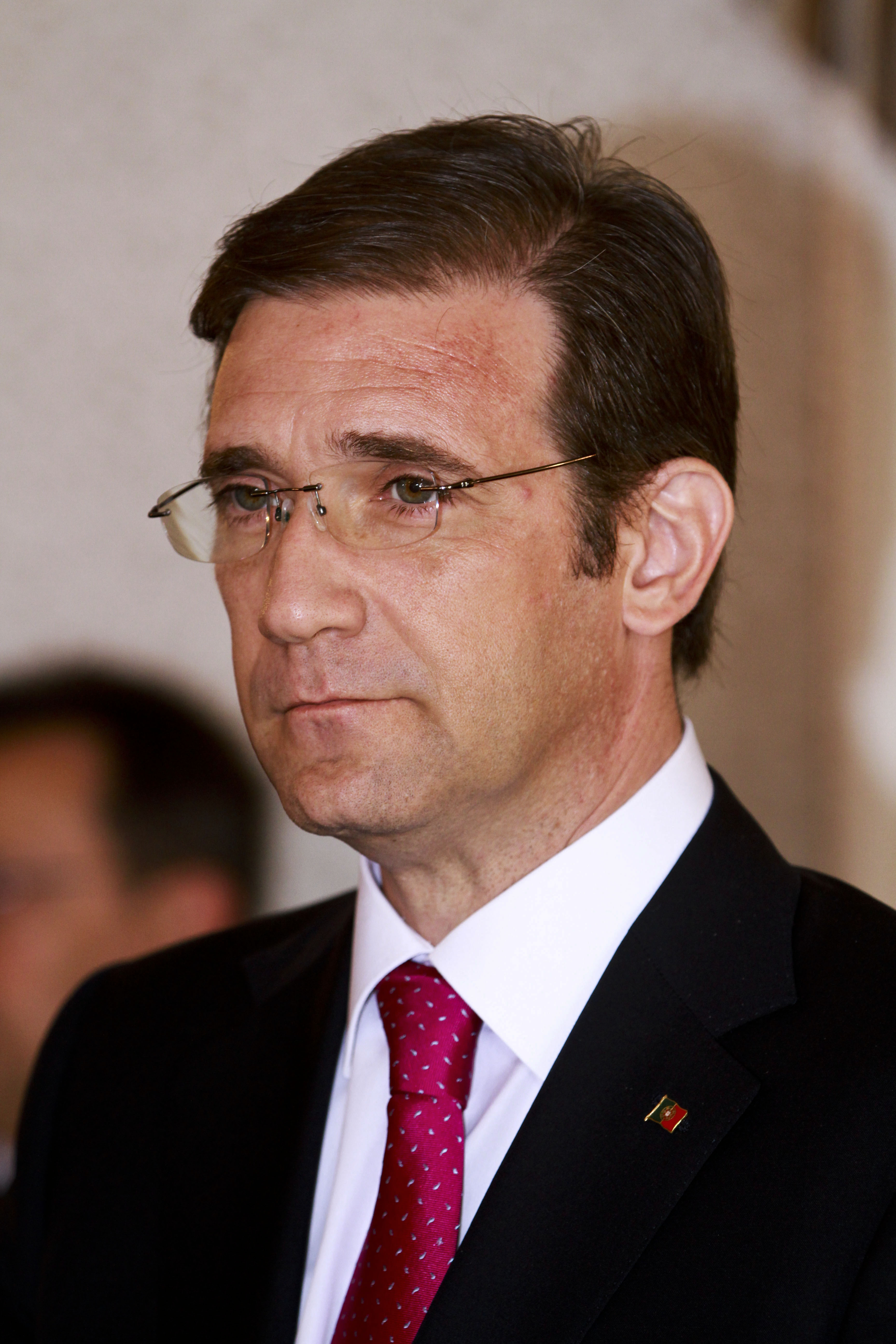
Pedro Passos Coelho

- 10 February – José Garcia, canoer.
- 24 July – Pedro Passos Coelho, prime minister

== Deaths ==
- 2 September – Francisco Craveiro Lopes, president (born 1894)
