= 1951 in Portugal =

- Decades: 1930s; 1940s; 1950s; 1960s; 1970s
- See also: History of Portugal; Timeline of Portuguese history; List of years in Portugal

Events in the year 1951 in Portugal.

== Incumbents ==
- President: Oscar Carmona (until 18 April); António de Oliveira Salazar (from 18 April to 21 July); Francisco Craveiro Lopes (from 21 July)
- Prime Minister: António de Oliveira Salazar (National Union)

== Events ==
- 22 July – Presidential election.

== Sports ==
- 8 February – F.C. Penafiel founded
- Establishment of the Portuguese Handball First Division
- Real Sport Clube founded

== Births ==
- 6 June – Manuel Fernandes, football player and coach.
- 27 June – Manuel Cajuda, football manager.

== Deaths ==
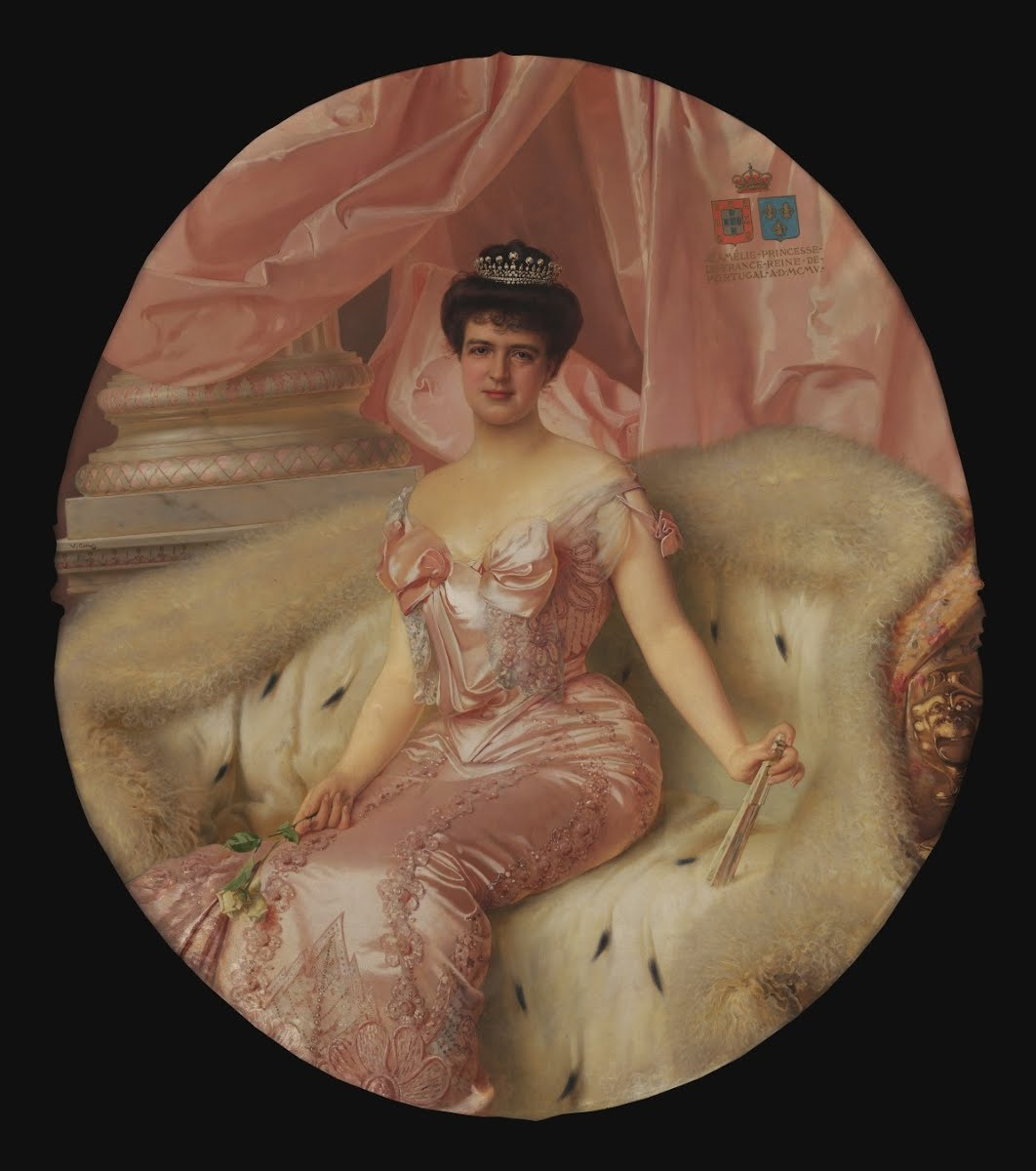
Amélie of Orléans

- 18 April – Óscar Carmona, president (born 1869)
- 25 October (in France) – Amélie of Orléans, Queen consort of Portugal
