= 1956 in Portugal =

- Decades: 1930s; 1940s; 1950s; 1960s; 1970s
- See also: History of Portugal; Timeline of Portuguese history; List of years in Portugal

Events in the year 1956 in Portugal.

== Incumbents ==
- President: Francisco Craveiro Lopes
- Prime Minister: António de Oliveira Salazar (National Union)

== Events ==
- 11–12 February – A cold spell across the country causes four deaths and sees Lisbon experience its coldest day of the 20th century, with the newspaper Diário de Lisboa reporting temperatures of −2 °C in the early hours of 12 February.

== Births ==
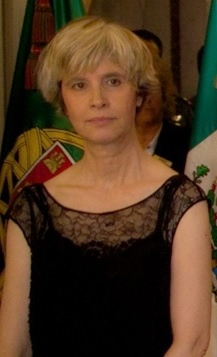
Maria da Assunção Esteves

- 23 March – José Manuel Barroso, politician
- 29 June – Pedro Santana Lopes, politician
- 15 October – Maria da Assunção Esteves, politician, Member of the European Parliament.

== Deaths ==
- 27 October – Domingos Leite Pereira, politician (b. 1880).
- 11 November – António Ferro, writer and politician (b. 1895).
