= 1965 in Portugal =

- Decades: 1940s; 1950s; 1960s; 1970s; 1980s
- See also: History of Portugal; Timeline of Portuguese history; List of years in Portugal

Events in the year 1965 in Portugal.

== Incumbents ==
- President: Américo Tomás
- Prime Minister: António de Oliveira Salazar (National Union)

== Events ==
- 15 September - Harry Reedman arrives in Lisbon to set up the Rhodesian mission there.
- 7 November – Portuguese legislative election, 1965.
- Portuguese presidential election, 1965

== Arts and entertainment ==
- 20 March - "Sol de inverno", performed by Simone de Oliveira, Portugal's entry in the Eurovision Song Contest held in Naples, finishes twelfth.

== Sports ==
- C.D. Mafra founded
- Vieira S.C. founded

== Births ==
- 3 February - Manuel Loff, politician
- 27 February - Pedro Chaves, racing driver
- 23 March - José Leal, footballer
- 27 March - Francisco Ribeiro, musician and composer (Madredeus) (d. 2010)
- 26 September - Alexandra Lencastre, actress
- 24 November - Rui Barros, footballer
- 24 December - Mafalda Veiga, singer-songwriter
- date unknown - Alexandre Delgado, composer

== Deaths ==
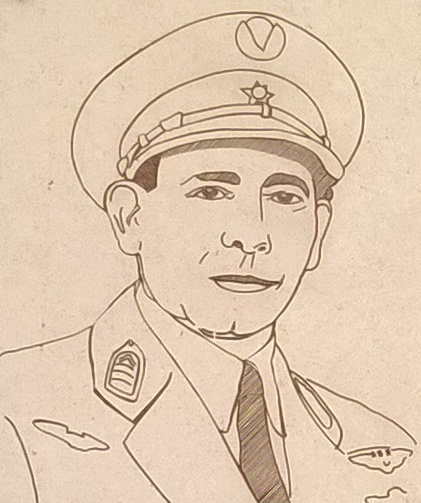
Humberto Delgado

- 13 February - Humberto Delgado, military leader and politician (born 1906); assassinated
- 11 June – José Mendes Cabeçadas, military officer and politician (born 1883)
