= 1919 Portuguese presidential election =

← Dec. 1918	6 December 1919	1923 →
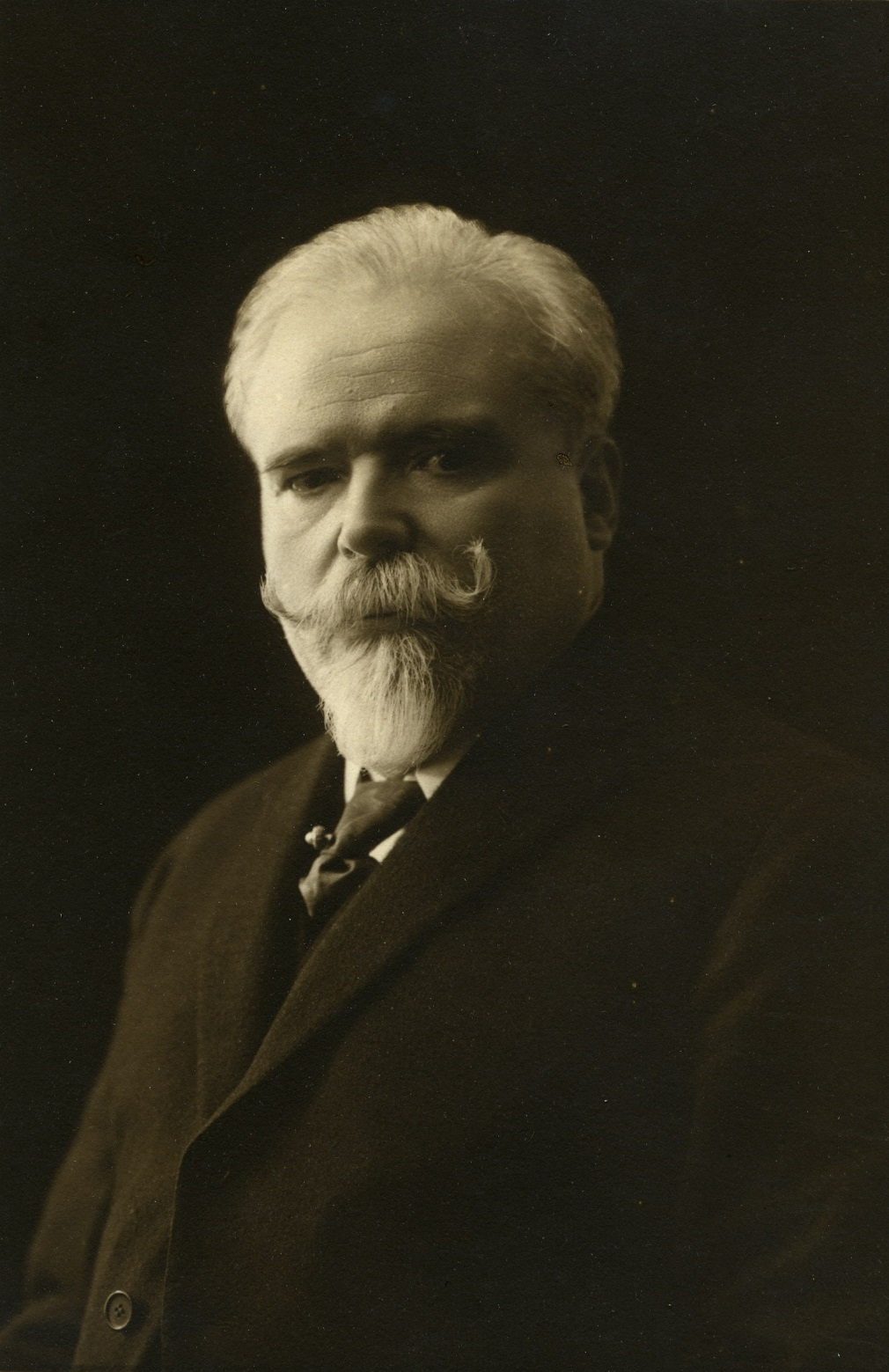

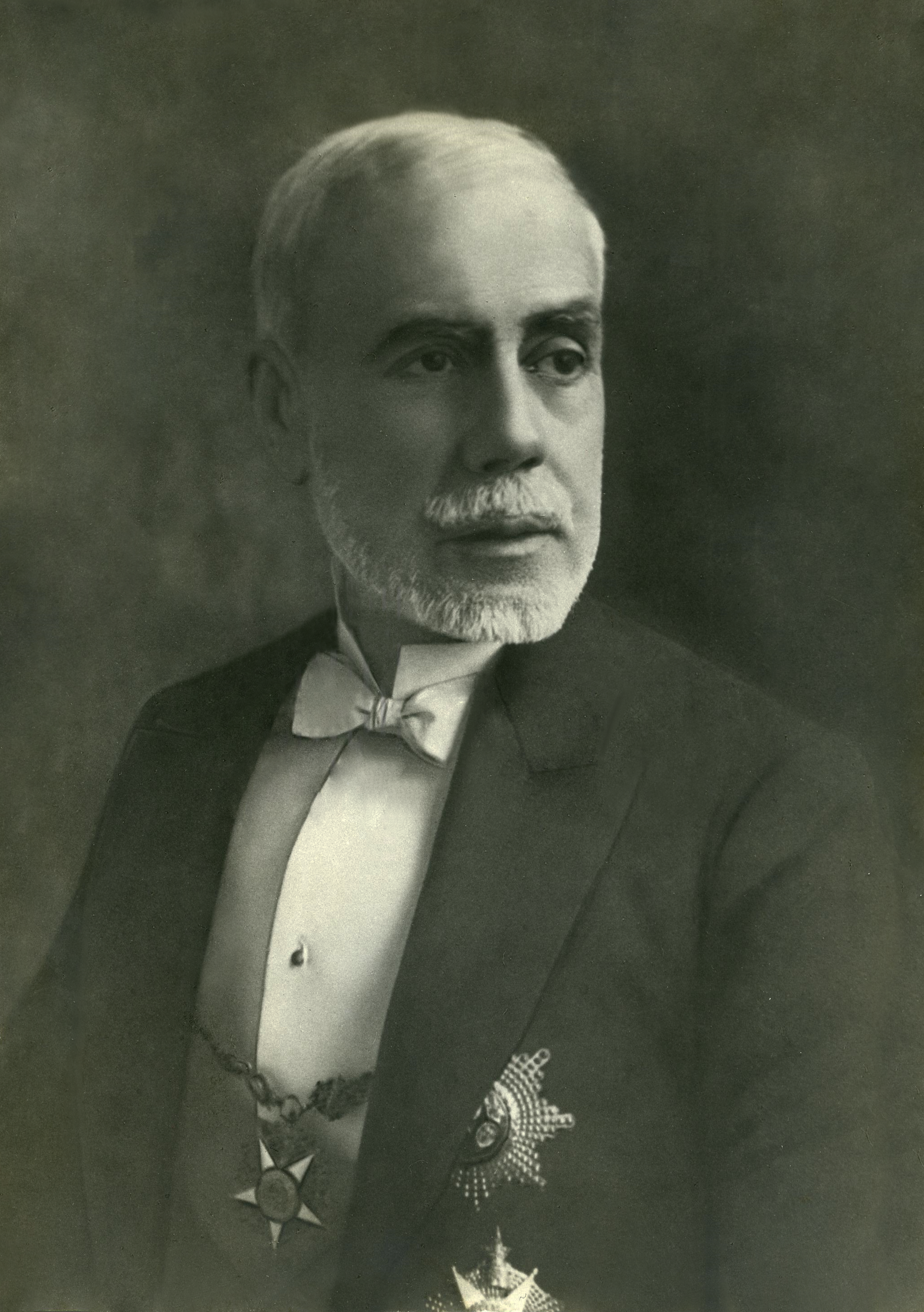
Candidate	António José de Almeida	Manuel Teixeira Gomes
Party	Evolutionist	Democratic
Electoral vote	123	31
Percentage	73.65%	18.56%
President before election
João do Canto e Castro
PNR
Elected President
António José de Almeida
Evolutionist

Presidential elections were held in Portugal on 6 December 1919. Following Portugal's 1911 constitution, the Congress of the Republic must elect the president in Lisbon instead of the Portuguese people.

There were a total of seven candidates. António José de Almeida of the Evolutionist Party won against his opponents and he was elected as the new President of Portugal.

== Results ==
Candidate	Party	First round		Second round		Third round	
Candidate	Party	Votes	%	Votes	%	Votes	%
António José de Almeida	Evolutionist	87	48.07	93	51.96	123	73.65
Manuel Teixeira Gomes	Democratic	82	45.30	83	46.37	31	18.56
Afonso Costa	Democratic	3	1.66				
Duarte Leite	Republican Union	1	0.55				
António Xavier Correia Barreto	Democratic	1	0.55				
Sebastião de Magalhães Lima	Democratic	1	0.55				
José Francisco de Azevedo e Silva	Democratic	1	0.55				
Blank votes		5	2.76	3	1.68	13	7.78
Total		181	100.00	179	100.00	167	100.00
Source: CPHRC
