= 1954 in Portugal =

- Decades: 1930s; 1940s; 1950s; 1960s; 1970s
- See also: History of Portugal; Timeline of Portuguese history; List of years in Portugal

Events in the year 1954 in Portugal.

== Incumbents ==
- President: Francisco Craveiro Lopes
- Prime Minister: António de Oliveira Salazar (National Union)

== Events ==
- 22 July – 11 August - Indian annexation of Dadra and Nagar Haveli

== Sport ==
- 4 April - Establishment of F.C. Maia
- 27 June - Taça de Portugal Final
- 1 December - Opening of the Estádio da Luz, in Lisbon
- Star World Championships, in Cascais
- Opening of the Pavilhão Rosa Mota, in Porto
- Establishment of CA Macedo de Cavaleiros

== Births ==
- 9 February - Ana Gomes, diplomat and politician
- 21 March - Adelino Teixeira, former professional road cyclist
- 10 October - Fernando Santos, football manager, former footballer
