= 1973 in Portugal =

- Decades: 1950s; 1960s; 1970s; 1980s; 1990s
- See also: History of Portugal; Timeline of Portuguese history; List of years in Portugal

Events in the year 1973 in Portugal.

== Incumbents ==
- President: Américo Tomás
- Prime Minister: Marcelo Caetano (People's National Action)

== Events ==
- 11 October - 23 November: Earthquake in the Azores

== Arts and entertainment ==
Portugal participated in the Eurovision Song Contest 1973, with Fernando Tordo and the song "Tourada".

== Sport ==
In association football, for the first-tier league seasons, see 1972–73 Primeira Divisão and 1973–72 Primeira Divisão; for the Taça de Portugal seasons, see 1972–73 Taça de Portugal and 1973–74 Taça de Portugal.

- 17 June - Taça de Portugal Final

== Births ==
- 16 February – Luís Montenegro, politician, prime minister of Portugal
- 28 April – Pauleta, footballer
- 16 July – João Dias, politician
