= 1960 in Portugal =

- Decades: 1940s; 1950s; 1960s; 1970s; 1980s
- See also: History of Portugal; Timeline of Portuguese history; List of years in Portugal

Events in the year 1960 in Portugal.

== Incumbents ==
- President: Américo Tomás
- Prime Minister: António de Oliveira Salazar (National Union)

== Sport ==
- 3 July - Taça de Portugal Final
- 14 August - Portuguese Grand Prix
- 25 August - 11 September - Portugal at the 1960 Summer Olympics
- Establishment of the Volta ao Algarve
- Establishment of AD Grijó, C.D. Paços de Brandão and FC Alpendorada
