= 1971 in Portugal =

- Decades: 1950s; 1960s; 1970s; 1980s; 1990s
- See also: History of Portugal; Timeline of Portuguese history; List of years in Portugal

Events in the year 1971 in Portugal.

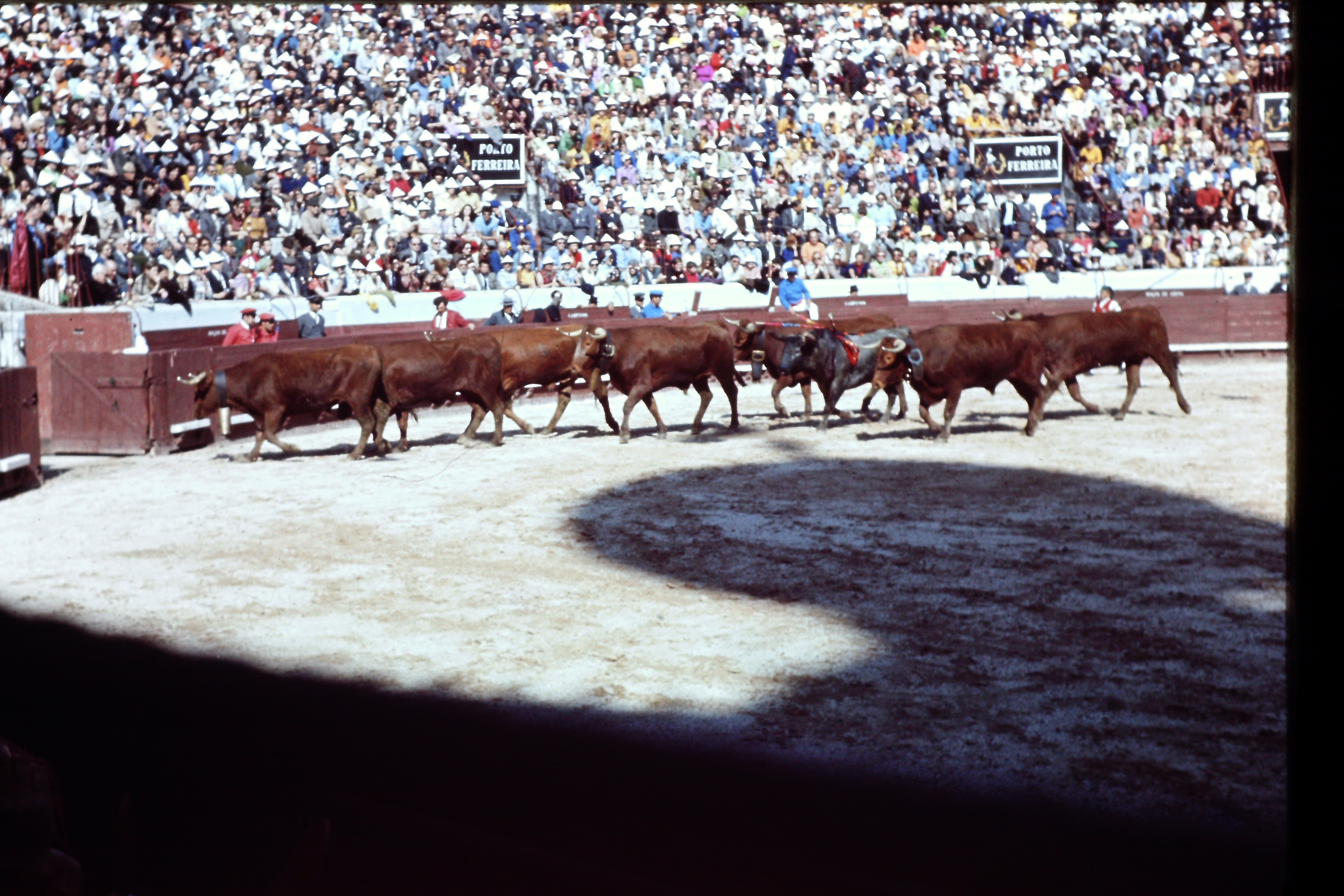
1971-3 Portugal Bull persuaded from the bullring

== Incumbents ==
- President: Américo Tomás
- Prime Minister: Marcelo Caetano (People's National Action)

== Arts and entertainment ==
Portugal participated in the Eurovision Song Contest 1971, with Tonicha and the song "Menina do alto da serra".

== Sport ==
In association football, for the first-tier league seasons, see 1970–71 Primeira Divisão and 1971–72 Primeira Divisão; for the Taça de Portugal seasons, see 1970–71 Taça de Portugal and 1971–72 Taça de Portugal.

- 27 June - Taça de Portugal Final
- Establishment of the Portuguese Handball Cup

== Births ==
- 29 May - Filipa Pinto, politician
- 21 July - Nuno Markl, comedian and radio host
- 14 October - Jorge Costa, football player and manager (d. 2025)
- Unknown date - Patricia Gonçalves, politician
