= 1966 in Portugal =

- Decades: 1940s; 1950s; 1960s; 1970s; 1980s
- See also: History of Portugal; Timeline of Portuguese history; List of years in Portugal

Events in the year 1966 in Portugal.

== Incumbents ==
- President: Américo Tomás
- Prime Minister: António de Oliveira Salazar (National Union)

== Arts and entertainment ==
Portugal participated in the Eurovision Song Contest 1966, with Madalena Iglésias and the song "Ele e ela".

== Sport ==
In association football, for the first-tier league seasons, see 1965–66 Primeira Divisão and 1966–67 Primeira Divisão; for the Taça de Portugal seasons, see 1965–66 Taça de Portugal and 1966–67 Taça de Portugal.

- 22 May - Taça de Portugal Final
- 6 June - Establishment of U.D. Leiria
- Establishment of the Portuguese Handball Second Division
- Establishment of C.D. Fátima and Rebordosa AC

== Deaths ==
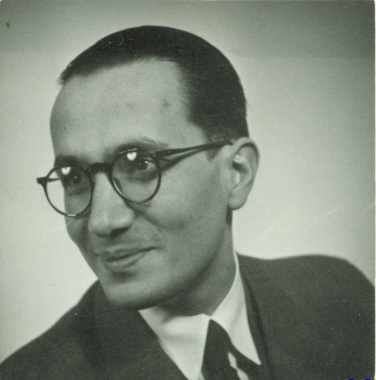
Delfim Santos

- 26 February – Delfim Santos, academic, philosopher, educationist, essayist and book and movie reviewer (born 1907).
