= 1961 in Portugal =

- Decades: 1940s; 1950s; 1960s; 1970s; 1980s
- See also: History of Portugal; Timeline of Portuguese history; List of years in Portugal

Events in the year 1961 in Portugal.

== Incumbents ==
- President: Américo Tomás
- Prime Minister: António de Oliveira Salazar (National Union)

== Events ==
- 23 January - Santa Maria hijacking
- Baixa de Cassanje revolt
- 30 May - Viasa Flight 897
- 12 November - Legislative election
- 18–19 December - Indian annexation of Goa

== Sport ==
In association football, for the first-tier league seasons, see 1960–61 Primeira Divisão and 1961–62 Primeira Divisão; for the Taça de Portugal seasons, see 1960–61 Taça de Portugal and 1961–62 Taça de Portugal.

- 9 July - Taça de Portugal Final
