= 1962 in Portugal =

- Decades: 1940s; 1950s; 1960s; 1970s; 1980s
- See also: History of Portugal; Timeline of Portuguese history; List of years in Portugal

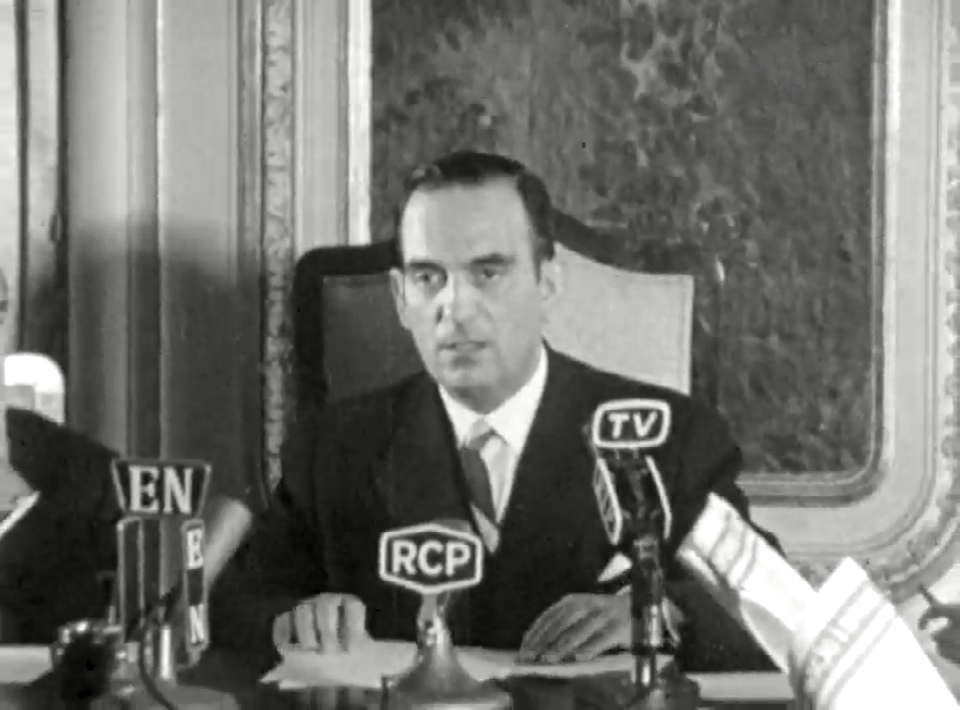
Adriano Moreira, Portuguese Minister for the Overseas, in a press conference in 1962.

Events in the year 1962 in Portugal.

== Incumbents ==
- President: Américo Tomás
- Prime Minister: António de Oliveira Salazar (National Union)

== Events ==
- Academic Crisis

== Sport ==
In association football, for the first-tier league seasons, see 1961–62 Primeira Divisão and 1962–63 Primeira Divisão; for the Taça de Portugal seasons, see 1961–62 Taça de Portugal and 1962–63 Taça de Portugal.

- 1 July - Taça de Portugal Final

== Births ==
- 13 March – Alfredo Maia, politician
