= 1972 in Portugal =

- Decades: 1950s; 1960s; 1970s; 1980s; 1990s
- See also: History of Portugal; Timeline of Portuguese history; List of years in Portugal

Events in the year 1972 in Portugal.

== Incumbents ==
- President: Américo Tomás
- Prime Minister: Marcelo Caetano (People's National Action)

== Arts and entertainment ==
Portugal participated in the Eurovision Song Contest 1972, with Carlos Mendes and the song "A festa da vida".

== Sport ==
In association football, for the first-tier league seasons, see 1971–72 Primeira Divisão and 1972–73 Primeira Divisão; for the Taça de Portugal seasons, see 1971–72 Taça de Portugal and 1972–73 Taça de Portugal.

- 4 June - Taça de Portugal Final
