= 1963 in Portugal =

- Decades: 1940s; 1950s; 1960s; 1970s; 1980s
- See also: History of Portugal; Timeline of Portuguese history; List of years in Portugal

Events in the year 1963 in Portugal.

== Incumbents ==
- President: Américo Tomás
- Prime Minister: António de Oliveira Salazar (National Union)

== Events ==
- May 28 - Cais do Sodré disaster - the roof of the Cais do Sodré train station in Lisbon collapsed. The accident caused 49 deaths and 63 people were injured.

== Sport ==
In association football, for the first-tier league seasons, see 1962–63 Primeira Divisão and 1963–64 Primeira Divisão; for the Taça de Portugal seasons, see 1962–63 Taça de Portugal and 1963–64 Taça de Portugal.

- 30 June - Taça de Portugal Final

== Births ==
- 26 January - José Mourinho, football manager, former football player
- 14 July - Paulo Macedo, businessman and politician
