= 1959 in Portugal =

- Decades: 1930s; 1940s; 1950s; 1960s; 1970s
- See also: History of Portugal; Timeline of Portuguese history; List of years in Portugal

Events in the year 1959 in Portugal.

== Incumbents ==
- President: Américo Tomás
- Prime Minister: António de Oliveira Salazar (National Union)

== Births ==
- 10 February - Fernando Chalana, football player and manager
- 9 April - Adriano Luz, actor
- 18 April - Carlos Freire (footballer), association footballer (forward for Sporting CP)

== Events ==
- 29 December - Opening of the Lisbon Metro

== Sport ==
- 21 March - International Cross Country Championships, in Lisbon
- 19 July - Taça de Portugal Final
- 23 August - Portuguese Grand Prix
- Establishment of the Portuguese Women's Volleyball League.
