= 1968 in Portugal =

- Decades: 1940s; 1950s; 1960s; 1970s; 1980s
- See also: History of Portugal; Timeline of Portuguese history; List of years in Portugal

Events in the year 1968 in Portugal.

== Incumbents ==
- President: Américo Tomás
- Prime Minister: António de Oliveira Salazar (National Union) (until 27 September); Marcelo Caetano (National Union) (from 27 September)

== Arts and entertainment ==
Portugal participated in the Eurovision Song Contest 1968, with Carlos Mendes and the song "Verão".

== Sport ==
In association football, for the first-tier league seasons, see 1967–68 Primeira Divisão and 1968–69 Primeira Divisão; for the Taça de Portugal seasons, see 1967–68 Taça de Portugal and 1968–69 Taça de Portugal.

- 16 June - Taça de Portugal Final
