= 1969 in Portugal =

- Decades: 1940s; 1950s; 1960s; 1970s; 1980s
- See also: History of Portugal; Timeline of Portuguese history; List of years in Portugal

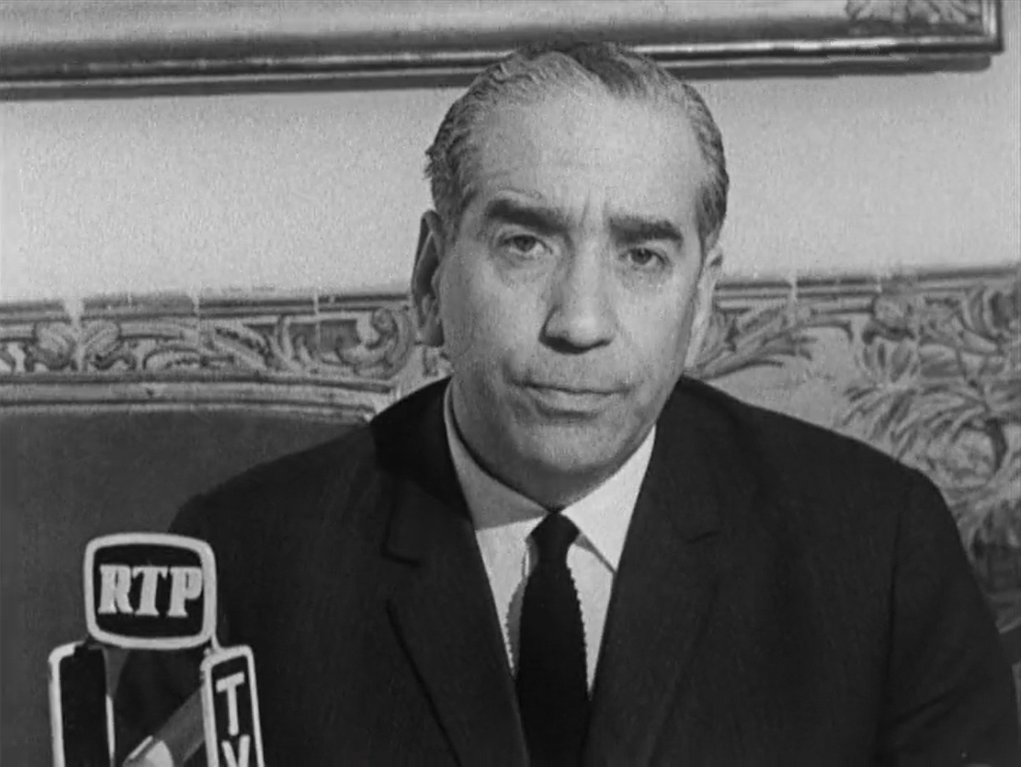
Alberto Franco Nogueira in April, 1969

Events in the year 1969 in Portugal.

== Incumbents ==
- President: Américo Tomás
- Prime Minister: Marcelo Caetano (National Union)

== Arts and entertainment ==
Portugal participated in the Eurovision Song Contest 1969, with Simone de Oliveira and the song "Desfolhada portuguesa".

== Sport ==
In association football, for the first-tier league seasons, see 1968–69 Primeira Divisão and 1969–70 Primeira Divisão; for the Taça de Portugal seasons, see 1968–69 Taça de Portugal and 1969–70 Taça de Portugal.

- 22 June - Taça de Portugal Final
