= 1967 in Portugal =

- Decades: 1940s; 1950s; 1960s; 1970s; 1980s
- See also: History of Portugal; Timeline of Portuguese history; List of years in Portugal

Events in the year 1967 in Portugal.

== Incumbents ==
- President: Américo Tomás
- Prime Minister: António de Oliveira Salazar (National Union)

== Arts and entertainment ==
On 8 April, Portugal participated in the Eurovision Song Contest 1967, with Eduardo Nascimento and the song "O vento mudou".

== Sport ==
In association football, for the first-tier league seasons, see 1966–67 Primeira Divisão and 1967–68 Primeira Divisão; for the Taça de Portugal seasons, see 1966–67 Taça de Portugal and 1967–68 Taça de Portugal.

- 9 July - Taça de Portugal Final

== Natural disasters ==
In 25 November, heavy rains lead to flash floods in the area of Lisbon, killing over 500 people.
