= 1953 in Portugal =

- Decades: 1930s; 1940s; 1950s; 1960s; 1970s
- See also: History of Portugal; Timeline of Portuguese history; List of years in Portugal

Events in the year 1953 in Portugal.

== Incumbents ==
- President: Francisco Craveiro Lopes
- Prime Minister: António de Oliveira Salazar (National Union)

== Events ==
- 8 November - Legislative election

== Sport ==
In association football, for the first-tier league seasons, see 1952–53 Primeira Divisão and 1953–54 Primeira Divisão; for the Taça de Portugal seasons, see 1952–53 Taça de Portugal and 1953–54 Taça de Portugal.

- 28 June - Taça de Portugal Final
- Establishment of AD Os Limianos
- Establishment of Vilaverdense FC

== Births ==
- 1 March - Carlos Queiroz, football manager
