= May 1915 Portuguese presidential election =

| ← 1911 | 29 May 1915 | Aug. 1915 → |
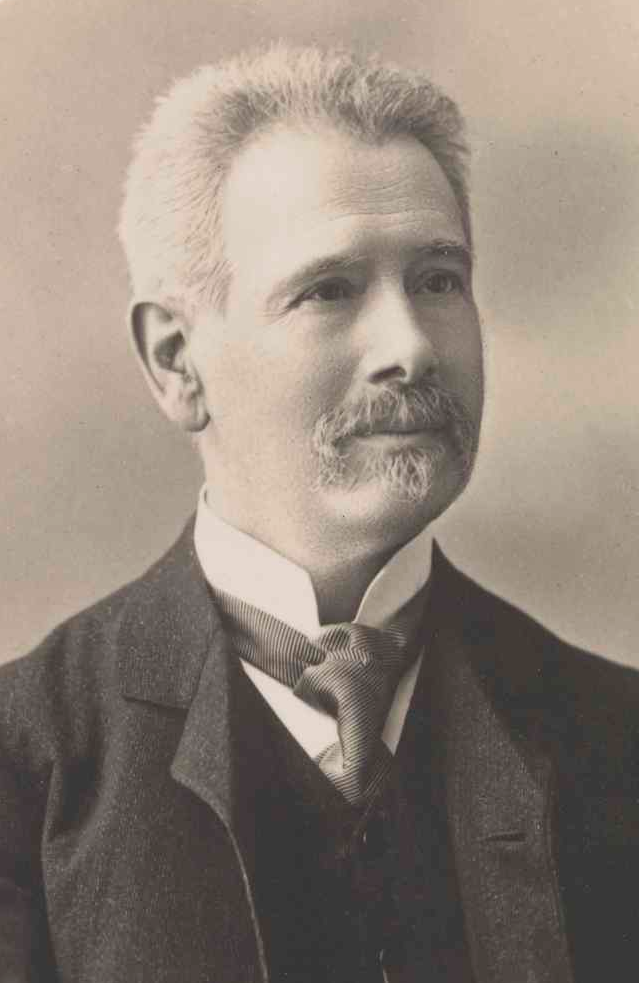

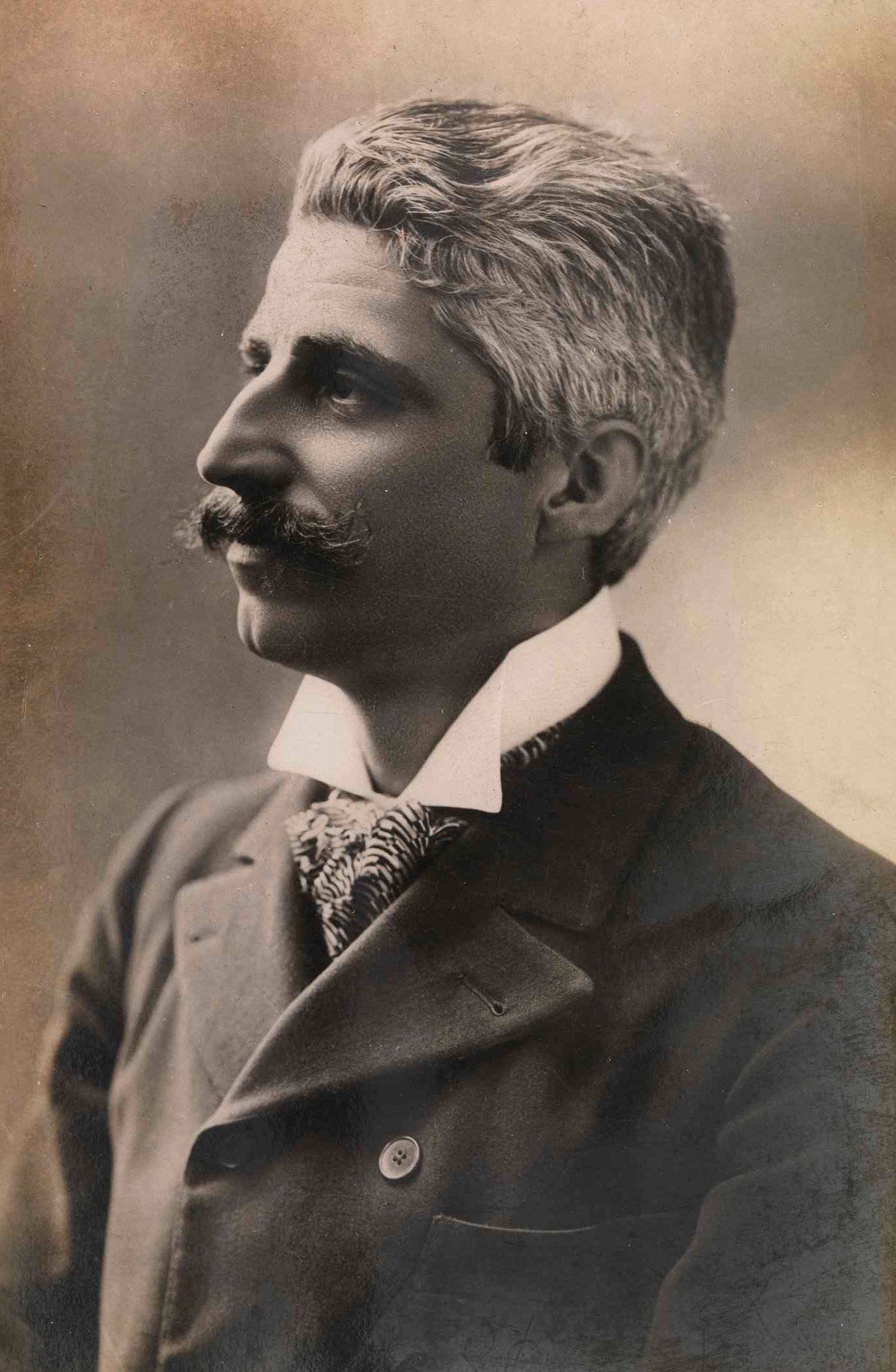
| Candidate | Teófilo Braga | Duarte Leite |
| Party | Democratic | Independent |
| Electoral vote | 98 | 1 |
| Percentage | 96.08% | 0.98% |
President before election
Manuel de Arriaga
Democratic
Elected President
Teófilo Braga
Democratic

Presidential elections were held in Portugal on 29 May 1915. Following the resignation of president Manuel de Arriaga, an election was held to see who would complete the remainder of his term. Portugal's 1911 constitution stated that the Congress of the Republic must elect the president in Lisbon instead of the Portuguese people.

Teófilo Braga, the former President of the Provisional Government was elected to replace Manuel de Arriaga with almost unanimous support from Congress, becoming the second President of the Republic.

== Results ==
| Candidate | Party | Votes | % |
|---|---|---|---|
| Teófilo Braga | Democratic | 98 | 96.08 |
| Duarte Leite | Independent | 1 | 0.98 |
| Blank votes | | 3 | 2.94 |
| Total | | 102 | 100.00 |
Source: Archontology
