= Amarilis de Varennes =

Portuguese academic (born 1955)

- Education: Technical University of Lisbon; University of East Anglia
- Scientific career
- Workplaces: University of Lisbon
- Thesis: Some aspects of the host involvement in cowpea mosaic virus replication (1985)

Amarilis Paula Alberti de Varennes e Mendonça (born 1 November 1955) is a Portuguese academic who is currently a professor at the University of Lisbon and president of the Instituto Superior de Agronomia.

She graduated from the Technical University of Lisbon in 1979 and completed her PhD entitled "Some aspects of the host involvement in cowpea mosaic virus replication" at the University of East Anglia in 1985.
