= August 1915 Portuguese presidential election =

← May 1915	6 August 1915	Apr. 1918 →
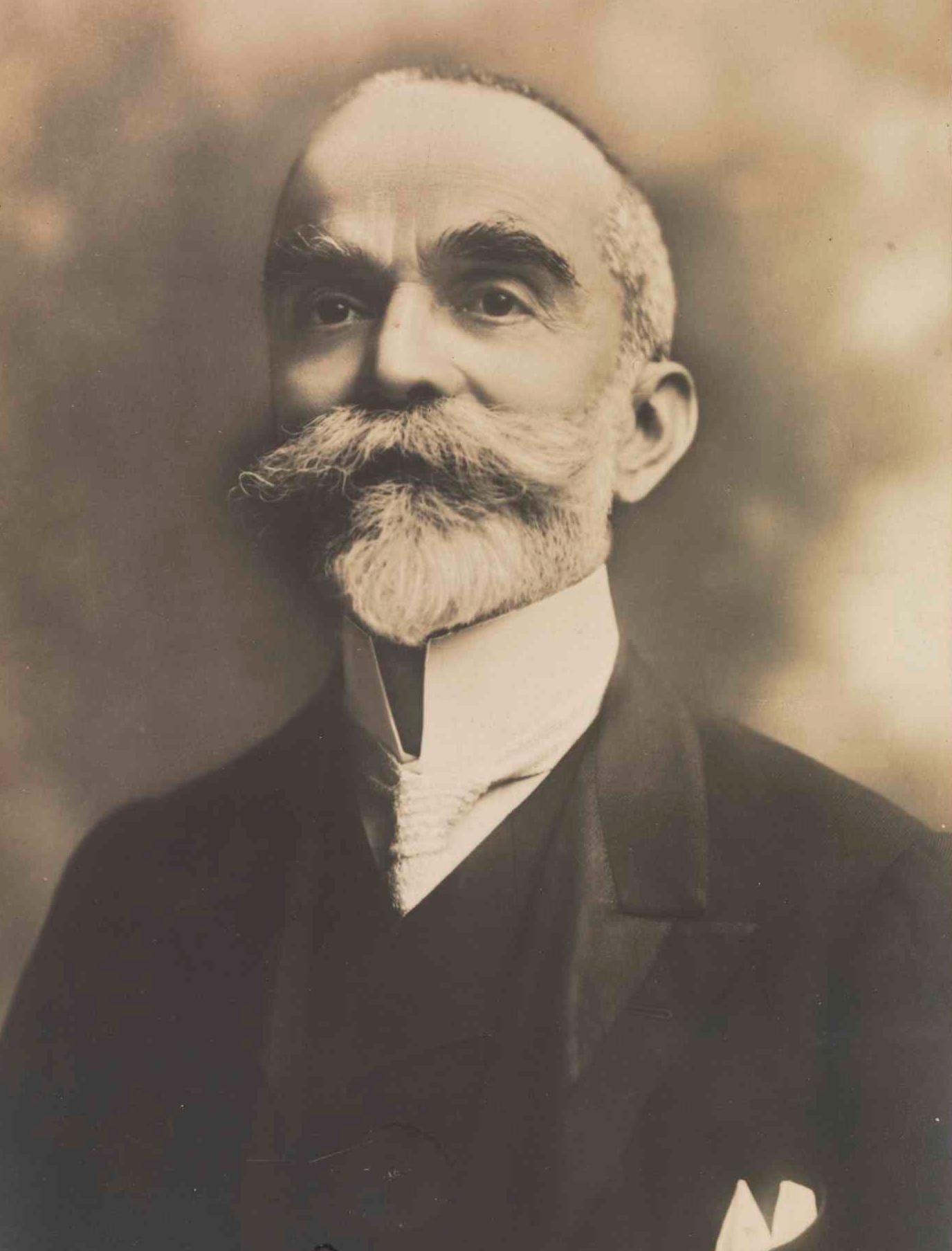

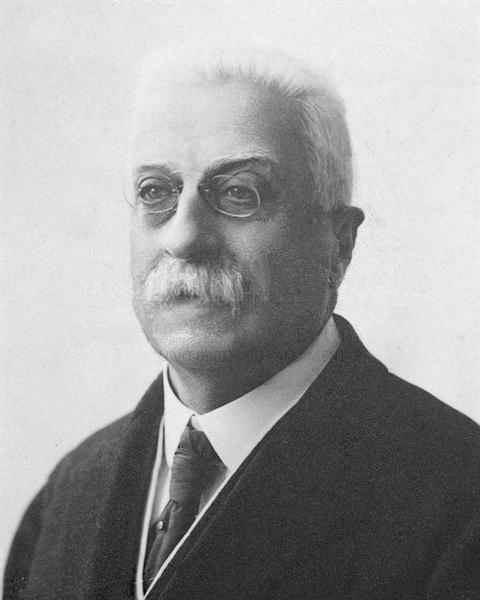
Candidate	Bernardino Machado	António Xavier Correia Barreto
Party	Democratic	Democratic
Electoral vote	134	18
Percentage	74.86%	10.06%
President before election
Teófilo Braga
Democratic
Elected President
Bernardino Machado
Democratic

Presidential elections were held in Portugal on 6 August 1915. Following Portugal's 1911 constitution, the Congress of the Republic must elect the president in Lisbon instead of the Portuguese people.

There were a total of seven candidates. One of the Democratic Party candidates, Bernardino Machado won against his opponents and he was elected as the new President of Portugal.

== Results ==
Candidate	Party	First round		Second round		Third round	
Candidate	Party	Votes	%	Votes	%	Votes	%
Bernardino Machado	Democratic	71	37.57	75	40.54	134	74.86
António Xavier Correia Barreto	Democratic	44	23.28	45	24.32	18	10.06
Guerra Junqueiro	Evolutionist	33	17.46	30	16.22		
Duarte Leite	Republican Union	20	10.58	19	10.27		
Augusto Alves da Veiga	Democratic	4	2.12	4	2.16		
Joaquim Pedro de Oliveira Martins	Independent	1	0.53				
José Ernesto de Sousa Caldas	Independent	1	0.53				
Blank votes		15	7.94	12	6.49	27	15.08
Total		189	100.00	185	100.00	179	100.00
Source: Archontology
