= 1911 Portuguese presidential election =

24 August 1911	May 1915 →
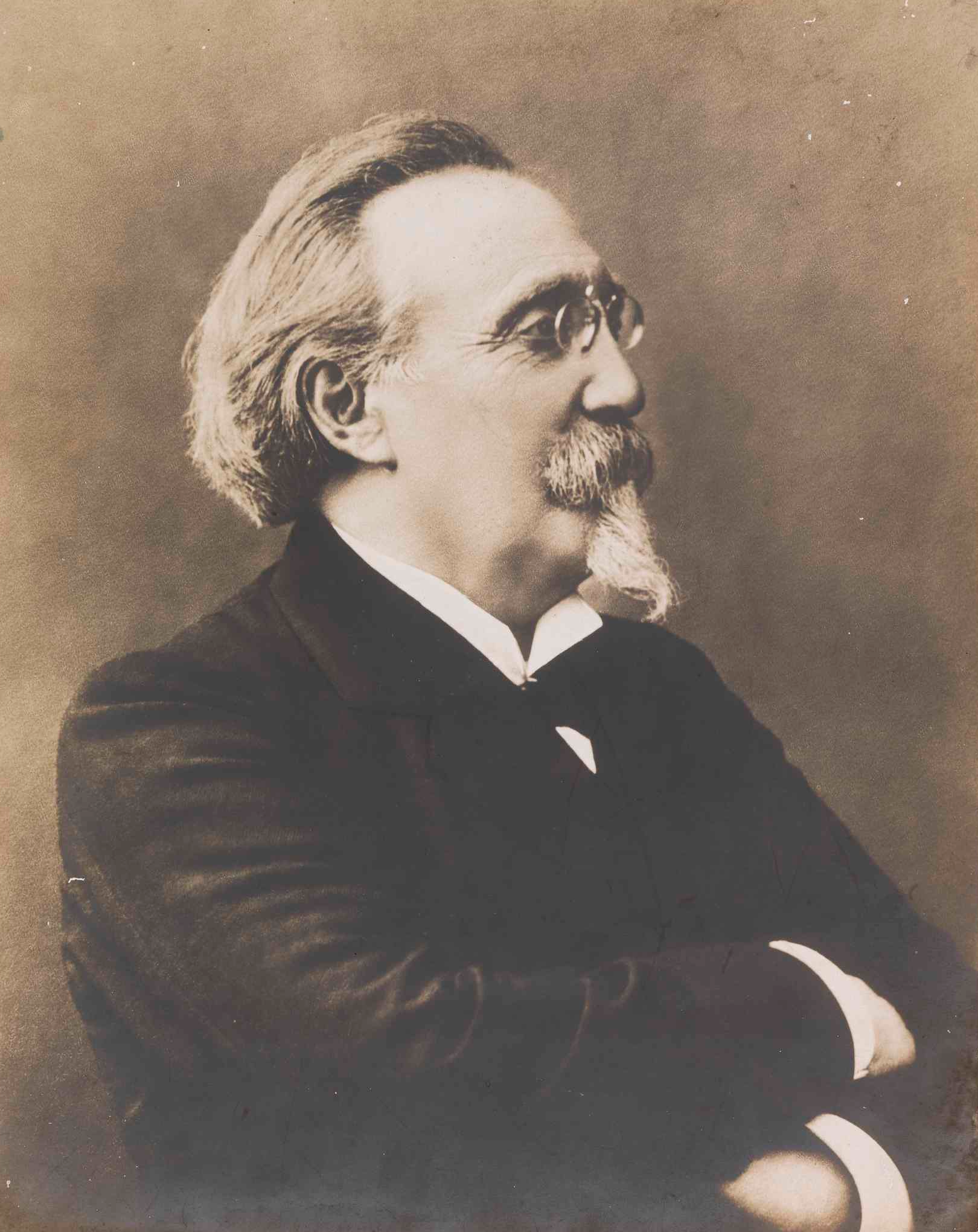

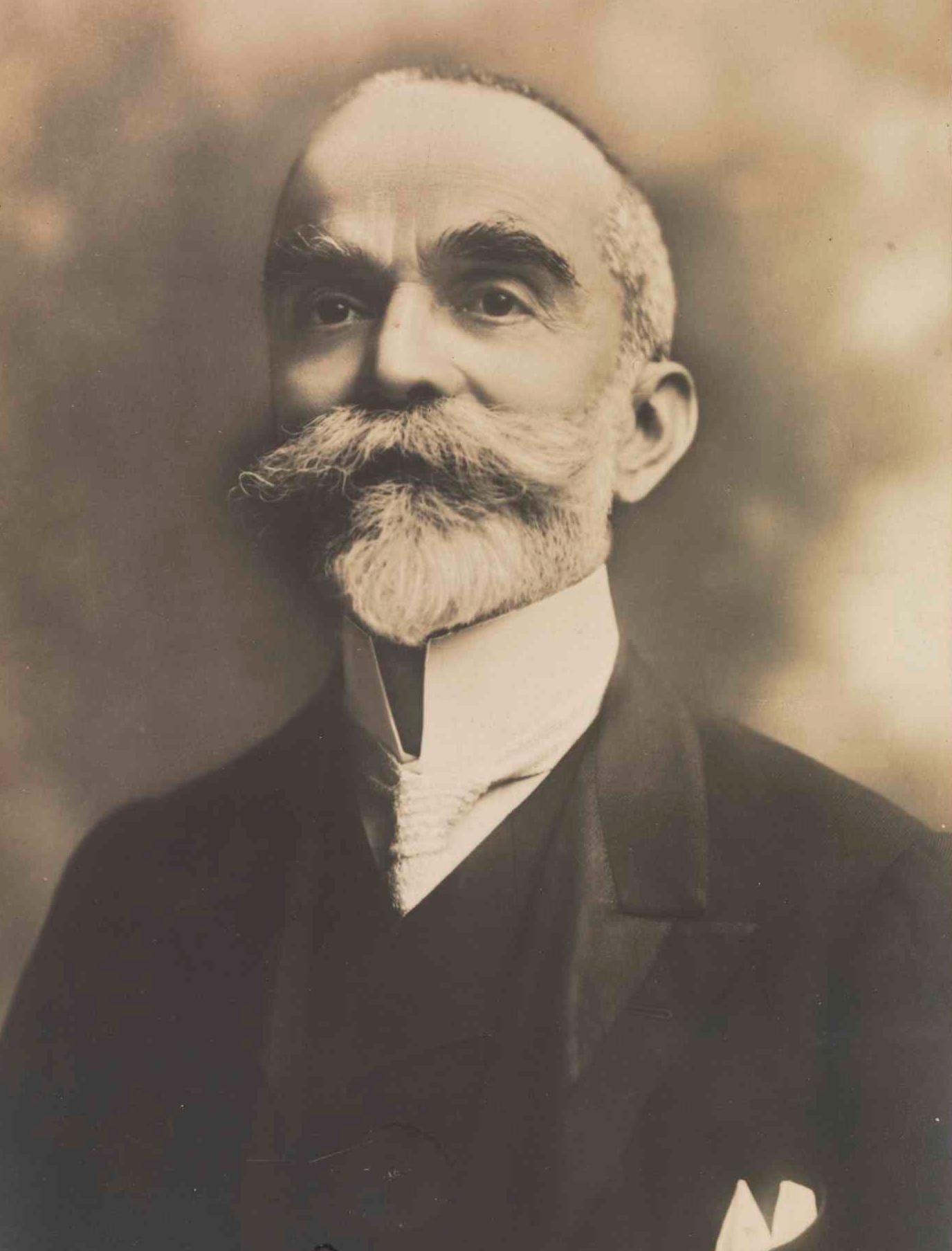
Candidate	Manuel de Arriaga	Bernardino Machado
Party	Republican	Republican
Electoral vote	121	86
Percentage	55.76%	39.63%
President before election
Teófilo Braga
Republican
Elected President
Manuel de Arriaga
Republican

Presidential elections were held in Portugal on 24 August 1911. Following the Portuguese revolution in 1910 which saw the overthrow of King Manuel II, a Republican Provisional Government was formed under the leadership of Teófilo Braga. This election was held to elect the first official president of the newly established the First Portuguese Republic. Portugal's 1911 constitution stated that the Congress of the Republic must elect the president in Lisbon instead of the Portuguese people.

There were a total of 5 candidates. Manuel de Arriaga was supported by the moderate Republicans (the origins of the Evolutionist and Unionist Party), while Bernardino Machado was supported by the radical republicans (the future Democratic Party) Manuel de Arriaga won against his opponents and he was elected as the first President of the First Portuguese Republic.

== Results ==
Candidate	Party	Votes	%
Manuel de Arriaga	Republican	121	55.76
Bernardino Machado	Republican	86	39.63
Duarte Leite	Independent	4	1.84
Sebastião de Magalhães Lima	Independent	1	0.46
Augusto Alves da Veiga	Independent	1	0.46
Blank votes		4	1.84
Total		217	100.00
Source: Archontology
