= 1925 Portuguese presidential election =

- 11 December 1925
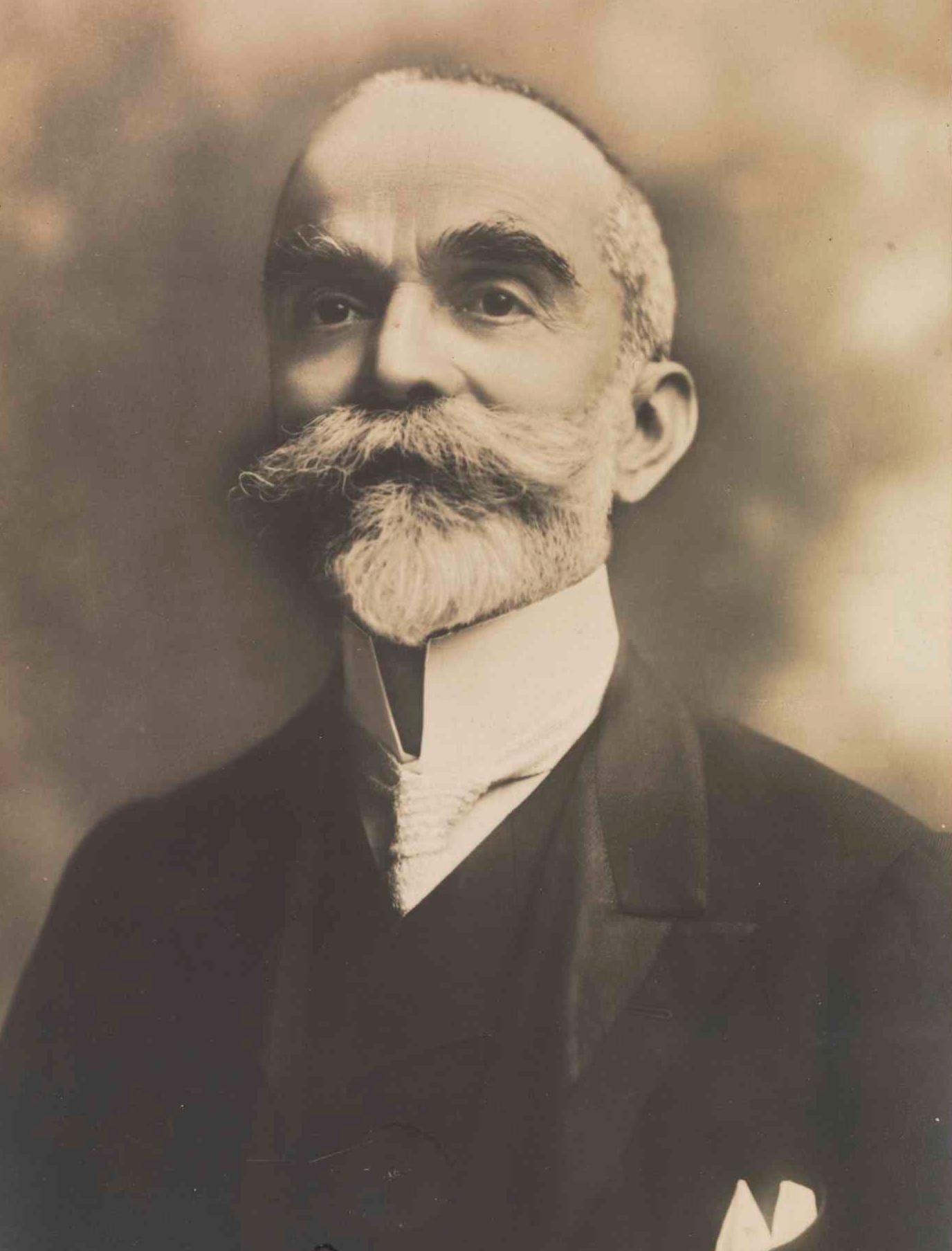

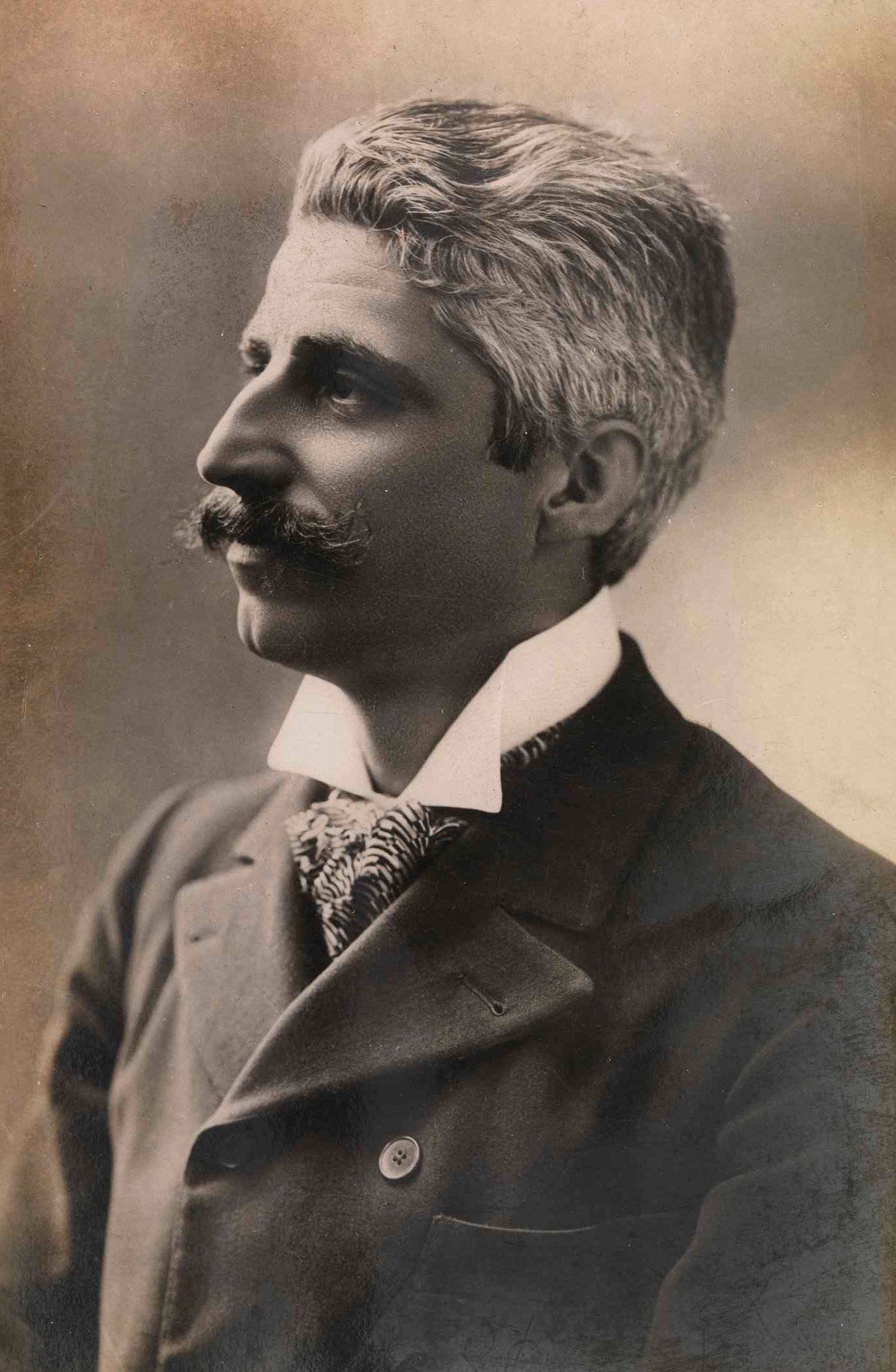
Candidate	Bernardino Machado	Duarte Leite
Party	Democratic	PLR
Electoral vote	148	5
Percentage	93.08%	3.14%
President before election
Manuel Teixeira Gomes
Democratic
Elected President
Bernardino Machado
Democratic

Presidential elections were held in Portugal on 11 December 1925. Following Portugal's 1911 constitution, the Congress of the Republic must elect the president in Lisbon instead of the Portuguese people.

There were a total of seven candidates. Bernardino Machado won against his opponents and he was granted a second term as the President of Portugal.

== Results ==
Candidate	Party	First round		Second round	
Candidate	Party	Votes	%	Votes	%
Bernardino Machado	Democratic	124	70.86	148	93.08
Duarte Leite	Republican Liberal	33	18.86	5	3.14
Francisco Gomes Teixeira	Republican Liberal	5	2.86		
José Jacinto Nunes	Republican Liberal	5	2.86		
António Maria de Bettencourt Rodrigues	Republican Liberal	1	0.57	1	0.63
Afonso Costa	Democratic	1	0.57		
Carlos Belo de Morais	Independent	1	0.57		
Blank votes		5	2.86	5	3.14
Total		175	100.00	159	100.00
Source: CPHRC
