= 1923 Portuguese presidential election =

- 6 August 1923
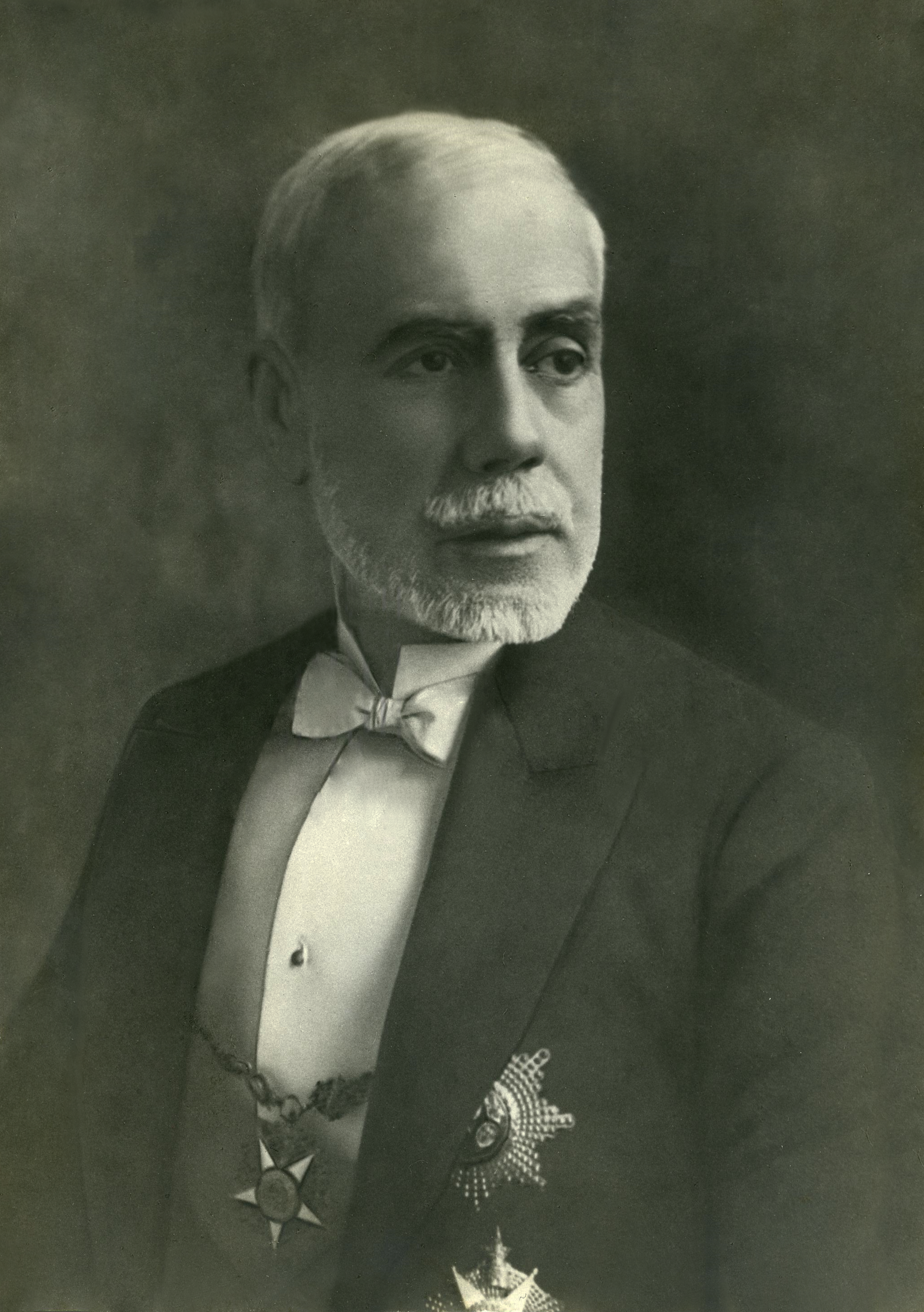

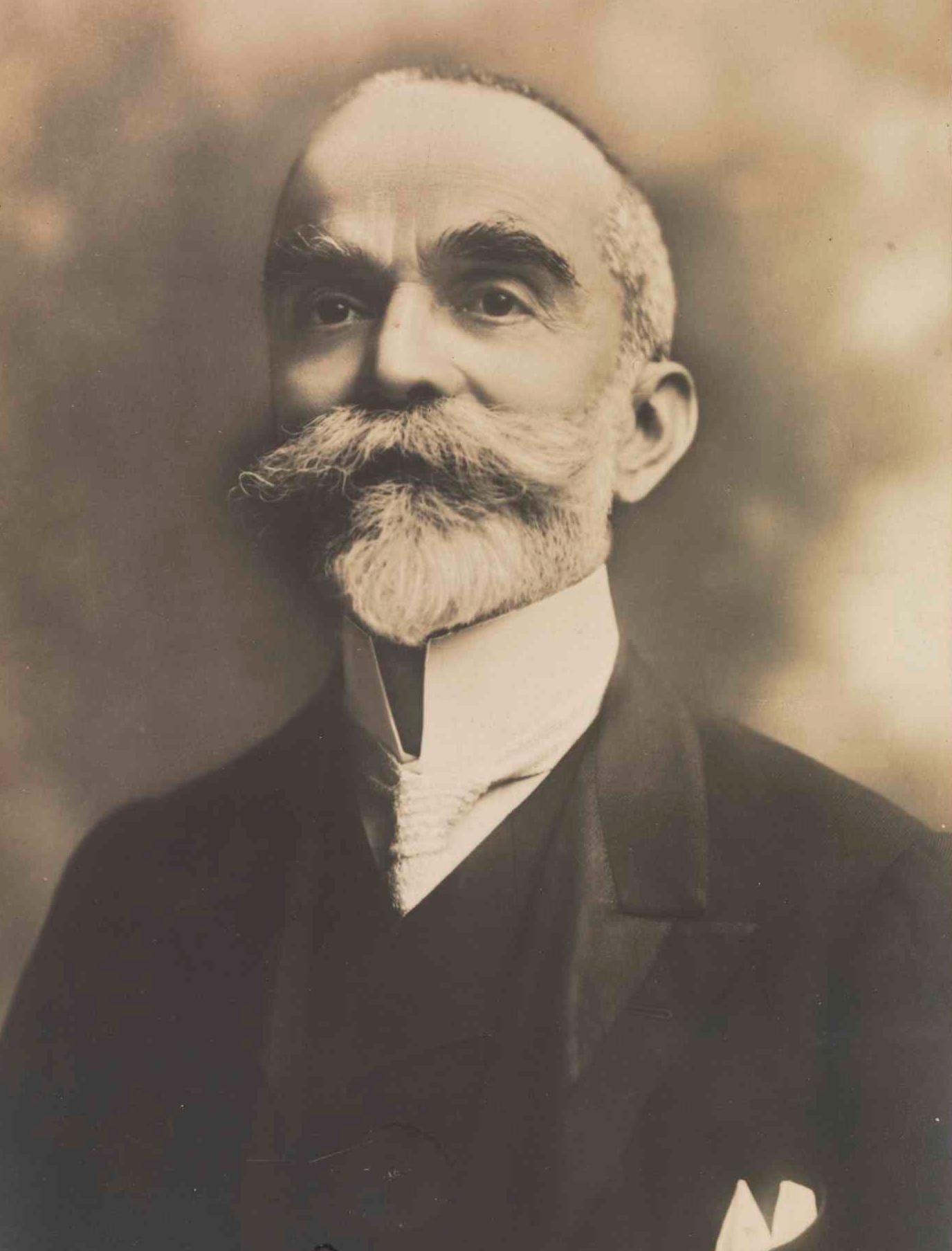
Candidate	Manuel Teixeira Gomes	Bernardino Machado
Party	Democratic	PRN
Electoral vote	121	5
Percentage	62.37%	2.58%
President before election
António José de Almeida
Evolutionist
Elected President
Manuel Teixeira Gomes
Democratic

Presidential elections were held in Portugal on 6 August 1923. The Congress of the Republic elected the president in Lisbon instead of the Portuguese people. However the new president Manuel Teixeira Gomes was elected In absentia, meaning that he wasn't present during the election.

There were a total of five candidates. Manuel Teixeira Gomes won the election against his opponents and became the next President of the Republic.

== Results ==
Candidate	Party	First round		Second round		Third round	
Candidate	Party	Votes	%	Votes	%	Votes	%
Manuel Teixeira Gomes	Democratic Party	108	57.75	117	58.50	121	62.37
Bernardino Machado	Nationalist Republican Party	73	39.04	71	35.50	5	2.58
Duarte Leite	Republican Liberal Party	3	1.60	1	0.50		
Augusto Vieira Soares	Democratic Party	1	0.53	2	1.00		
Sebastião de Magalhães Lima	Democratic Party	1	0.53				
Blank votes		1	0.53	9	4.50	68	35.05
Total		187	100.00	200	100.00	194	100.00
Source: CPHRC, President of Portugal
