= List of presidents of Portugal =

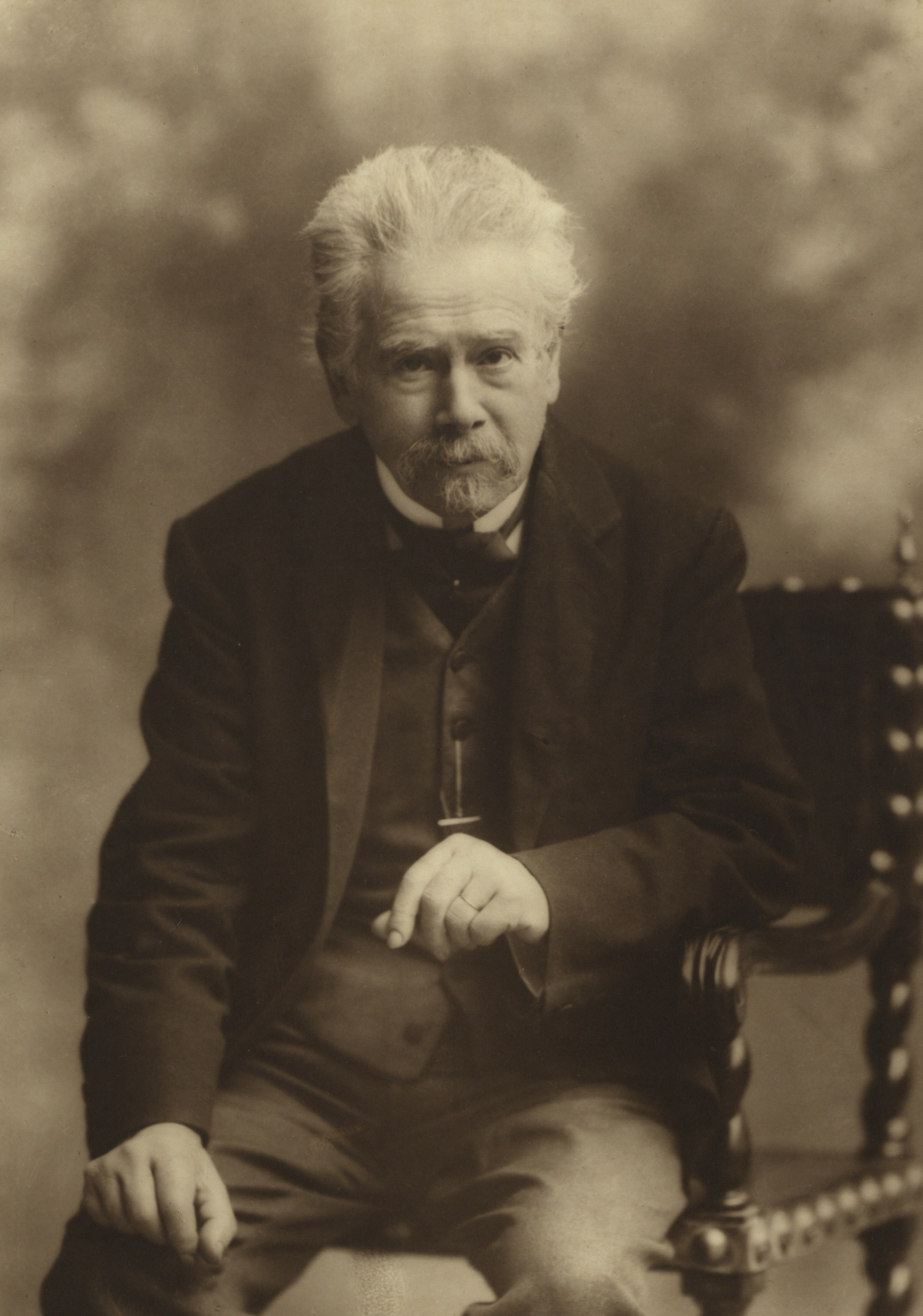
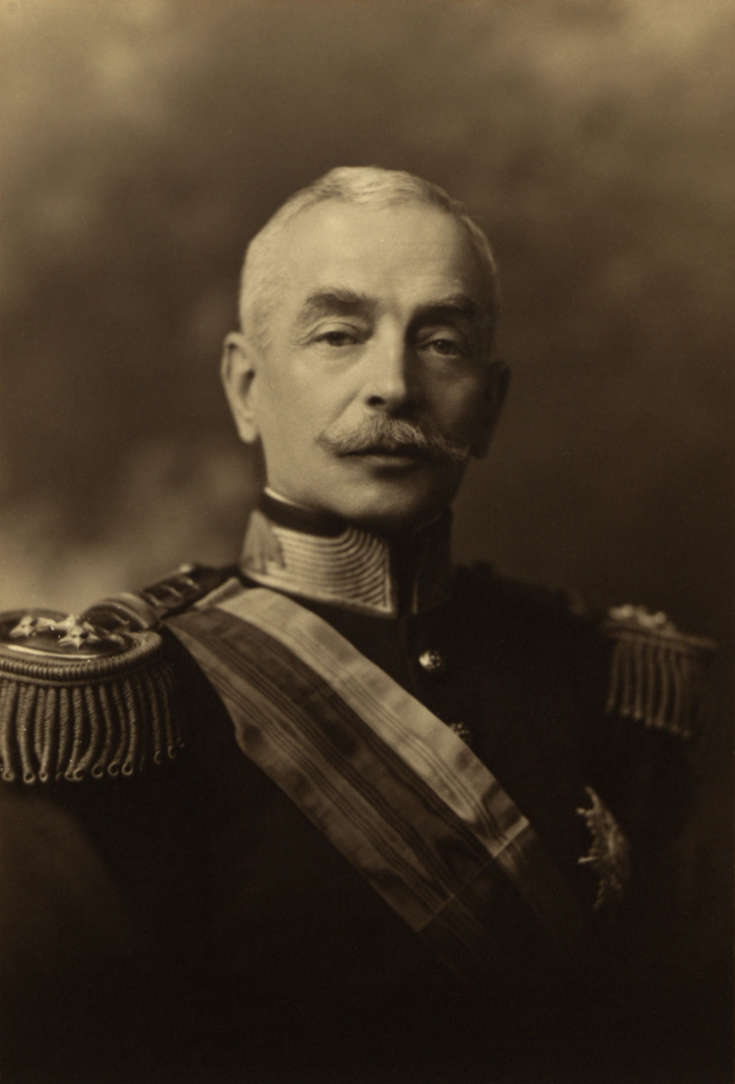
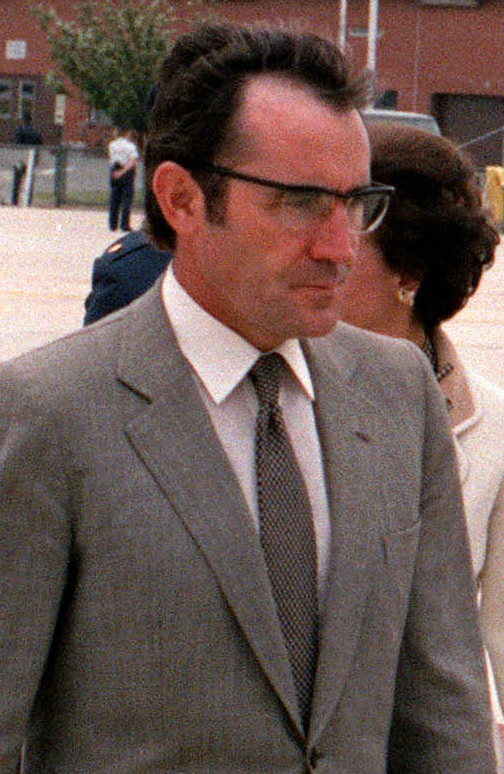
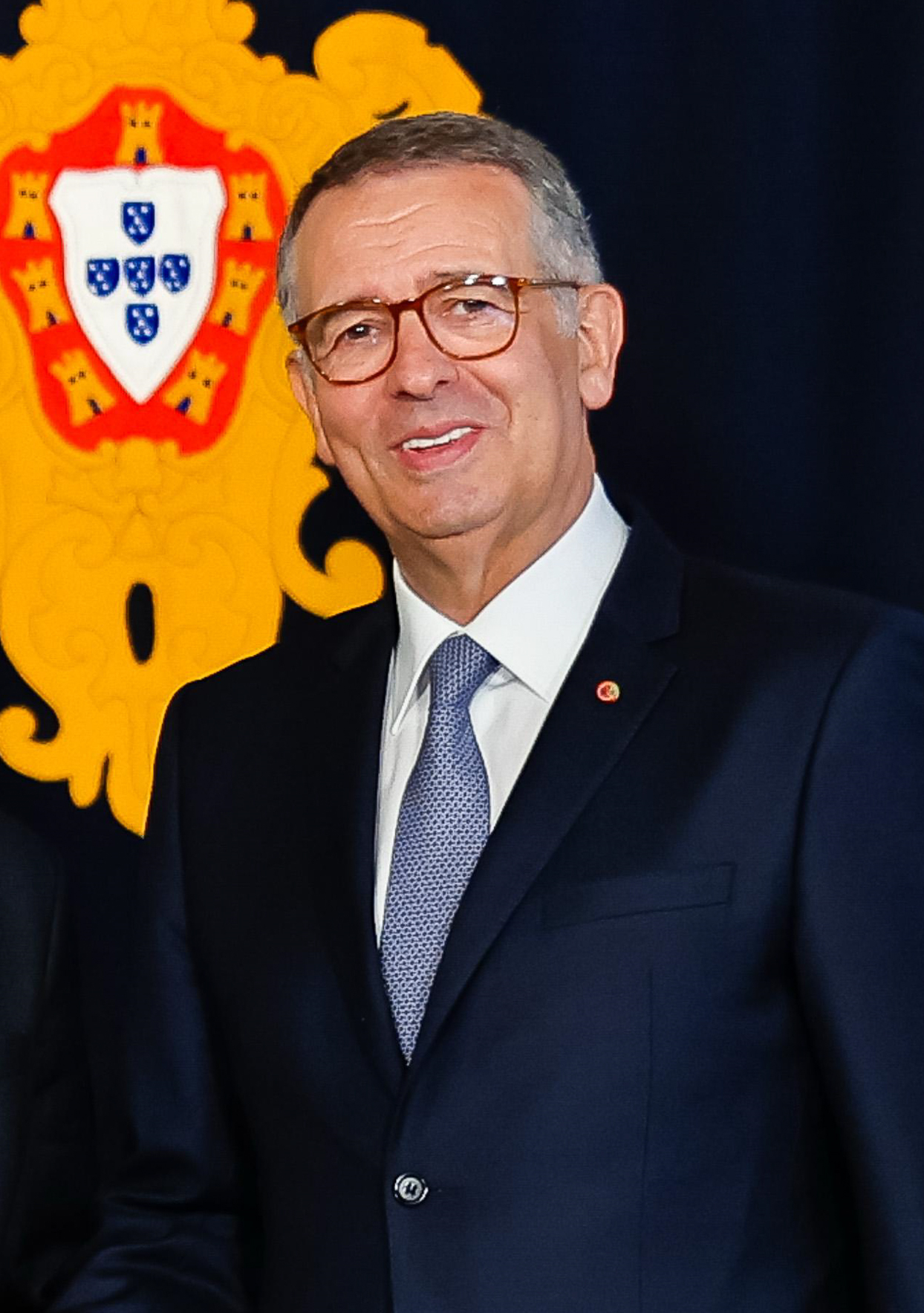
- Top left: Teófilo Braga President of the Provisional Government of the Republic.
- Top right: Óscar Carmona was the longest serving head of state.
- Bottom left: António Ramalho Eanes was the first president elected in democracy.
- Bottom right: António José Seguro is the incumbent president.

The complete list of presidents of the Portuguese Republic consists of the 21 heads of state in the history of Portugal since the 5 October 1910 revolution that installed a republican regime.

This list includes not only those persons who were sworn into office as President of Portugal but also those who de facto served as head of state since 1910. This is the case of Teófilo Braga who served as President of the Provisional Government after the republican coup d'état. Also Sidónio Pais, Mendes Cabeçadas, Gomes da Costa, as well as Canto e Castro and Óscar Carmona in their early months, were not sworn into office as presidents of the Republic, usually being prime ministers, but de facto accumulated this function, thus combining in practice head of state and head of government in one person.

See the notes for more information.

== Election terms ==
The numbering reflects the uninterrupted terms in office served by a single man. For example, Jorge Sampaio served two consecutive terms and is counted as the 19th president (not the 19th and 20th). Teófilo Braga served as the first and sole president of the Provisional Government, and therefore is not considered to be the first president, although he would serve again as head of state and be the second president after the resignation of Manuel de Arriaga.

However, Bernardino Machado served two non-consecutive terms, and he is counted as both the third and the eighth presidents. Because of this, the list below contains 20 presidencies, but only 19 presidents.

Under the Constitution of Portugal adopted in 1976, in the wake of the 1974 Carnation Revolution, the president is elected to a five-year term with the possibility of running for a second consecutive term; there is no limit to the number of terms a president may serve, but a president who serves two consecutive terms may not serve again in the next five years after the second term finishes.

The official residence of the president of Portugal is the Belém Palace.

The current president of the Portuguese Republic is António José Seguro, the winner of the 2026 presidential election.

== Presidents ==
The colors indicate the political affiliation of each president.

Republican
Democratic
National Republican
Evolutionist Party/Republican Liberal
National Union/Popular National Action
Democratic Renewal
Socialist
Social Democratic
Independent
Interim holder

=== First Republic (1910–1926) ===
No.	Portrait	President (Lifespan)	Term of office			Election	Party	Ref.
No.	Portrait	President (Lifespan)	Start	End	Duration	Election	Party	Ref.
President of the Provisional Government of the Republic (1910–1911)
-		Teófilo Braga (Note: Teófilo Braga served as President of the Provisional Government, the de facto head of government and head of state, from the republican revolution of 1910 to the election of Manuel de Arriaga, the 1st President of Portugal.) (1843–1924)	5 October 1910	24 August 1911	333 days	—	Republican	
Presidents of the Republic (1911–1926)
1		Manuel de Arriaga (1840–1917)	24 August 1911	26 May 1915^{[R]}	3 years, 278 days	1911	Republican later Democratic	
2		Teófilo Braga (1843–1924)	29 May 1915	5 October 1915	129 days	May; 1915	Democratic	
3		Bernardino Machado (1851–1944)	5 October 1915	5 December 1917^{[C]}	2 years, 60 days	August; 1915	Democratic	
-		Ministry (Head of State ex officio); President: Sidónio Pais	12 December 1917	28 April 1918	137 days	—	Independent	
4		Sidónio Pais (Note: After leading a coup d'état, Sidónio Pais became President of the Revolutionary Junta and later Prime Minister (President of the Ministry). He then abolished the post of Prime Minister, assuming himself as the head of government as President of the Republic. He was assassinated in 1918.) (1872–1918)	28 April 1918	14 December 1918^{[A]}	230 days	April; 1918	National Republican	
-		Ministry (Head of State ex officio); President: João do Canto e Castro	14 December 1918	16 December 1918	2 days	—	National Republican	
5		João do Canto e Castro (Note: Canto e Castro was head of the Council of Ministers that served as the head of state of Portugal after the assassination of Sidónio Pais in 1918, from December 14 to December 16. He then became interim president until the election of António José de Almeida.) (1862–1934)	16 December 1918	5 October 1919	293 days	December; 1918	National Republican	
6		António José de Almeida (1866–1929)	5 October 1919	5 October 1923	4 years	1919	Evolutionist later Republican Liberal	
7		Manuel Teixeira Gomes (1860–1941)	5 October 1923	11 December 1925^{[R]}	2 year, 67 days	1923	Democratic	
8		Bernardino Machado (1851–1944); 2nd time	11 December 1925	31 May 1926^{[C]}	171 days	1925	Democratic	

=== Second Republic (1926–1974) ===
No.	Portrait	President (Lifespan)	Term of office			Election	Party	Ref.
No.	Portrait	President (Lifespan)	Start	End	Duration	Election	Party	Ref.
Ditadura Nacional (National Dictatorship) (1926–1932)
9		José Mendes Cabeçadas (Note: Mendes Cabeçadas, Gomes da Costa and Óscar Carmona were the heads of the revolutionary provisional governments during the year of 1926. Although not called Presidents, they were de facto heads of state.) (1883–1965)	31 May 1926	17 June 1926^{[C]}	17 days	—	Independent	
-		Ministry (Head of State ex officio); President: Manuel Gomes da Costa	17 June 1926	29 June 1926	12 days	—	Independent	
10		Manuel Gomes da Costa (1863–1929)	29 June 1926	9 July 1926^{[C]}	10 days	—	Independent	
-		Ministry (Head of State ex officio); President: Óscar Carmona	9 July 1926	29 November 1926	143 days	—	Independent	
11		Óscar Carmona (Note: Óscar Carmona served initially as head of the revolutionary government after a counter-coup deposed Gomes da Costa. He was de facto head of state between July 9 and November 29, 1926. However he officially took office as President of the Republic on November 29, 1926. Six years later, in 1932, the Estado Novo was proclaimed and the National Union, the only legal party, was formed by António de Oliveira Salazar. Carmona joined the party and was the party's candidate for every presidential election (that were considered fraudulent) until 1951, when he died.) (1869–1951)	29 November 1926	15 April 1928	1 year, 138 days	—	Independent from 1932; National Union	
11	Estado Novo (New State) (1932–1974)						Independent from 1932; National Union	
11		Óscar Carmona (1869–1951)	15 April 1928	18 April 1951^{[D]}	23 years, 3 days	1928 1935 1942 1949	Independent from 1932; National Union	
-		António de Oliveira Salazar (Note: António de Oliveira Salazar, the dictatorial President of the Council of Ministers (a position roughly equivalent to the modern post of Prime Minister) occupied the post of president interim between the death of Óscar Carmona and the election of Francisco Craveiro Lopes.) (1889–1970) (interim)	18 April 1951	9 August 1951	113 days	—	National Union	
12		Francisco Craveiro Lopes (1894–1964)	9 August 1951	9 August 1958	7 years	1951	National Union	
13		Américo Tomás (1894–1987)	9 August 1958	25 April 1974^{[C]}	15 years, 259 days	1958 1965 1972	National Union from 1970; People's National Action	

=== Third Republic (1974–present) ===
No.	Portrait	President (Lifespan)	Term of office			Election	Party	Ref.
No.	Portrait	President (Lifespan)	Start	End	Duration	Election	Party	Ref.
Presidents appointed in the aftermath of the Carnation Revolution (1974–1976)
-	National Salvation Junta (Note: Between the Carnation Revolution on April 25, 1974 and May 15 of the same year, António de Spínola was the head of the National Salvation Junta, being the de facto head of state and government. On May 15 Spínola was nominated by the Junta as President of the Republic but he continued as the de facto head of government, until Adelino da Palma Carlos became the Prime Minister the following day.); President: António de Spínola		25 April 1974	15 May 1974	20 days	—	Independent	
14		António de Spínola (1910–1996)	15 May 1974	30 September 1974^{[R]}	138 days	—	Independent	
15		Francisco da Costa Gomes (1914–2001)	30 September 1974	14 July 1976	1 year, 288 days	—	Independent	
Presidents elected under the Constitution of the Republic (1976–present)
16		António Ramalho Eanes (born 1935)	14 July 1976	9 March 1986	9 years, 238 days	1976 1980	Independent from 1985; Democratic Renewal	
17		Mário Soares (1924–2017)	9 March 1986	9 March 1996	10 years	1986 1991	Socialist (Note: Party member that suspended his membership during his term in office.)	
18		Jorge Sampaio (1939–2021)	9 March 1996	9 March 2006	10 years	1996 2001	Socialist	
19		Aníbal Cavaco Silva (born 1939)	9 March 2006	9 March 2016	10 years	2006 2011	Social Democratic (Note: Party member that suspended his membership during his term in office.)	
20		Marcelo Rebelo de Sousa (born 1948)	9 March 2016	9 March 2026	10 years	2016 2021	Social Democratic (Note: Party member that suspended his membership during his term in office.)	
21		António José Seguro (born 1962)	9 March 2026	Incumbent	216 days	2026	Socialist	

== Timeline ==
Timeline of Presidents of Portugal (1910–present)

== Birthplaces ==
Birthplaces of the presidents of the Portuguese Republic born in the Azores.	Birthplaces of the presidents of the Portuguese Republic born outside of Portugal.	Birthplaces of the presidents of the Portuguese Republic born in Mainland Portugal.

== Presidents by time in office ==
Rank	President	Time in office	Terms	Party
1	Óscar Carmona	24 years, 286 days	5	Nonpartisan → National Union
2	Américo Tomás	15 years, 259 days	3	National Union → People's National Action
3	Mário Soares	10 years, 0 days	2	Socialist
3	Jorge Sampaio	10 years, 0 days	2	Socialist
3	Aníbal Cavaco Silva	10 years, 0 days	2	Social Democratic
3	Marcelo Rebelo de Sousa	10 years, 0 days	2	Social Democratic
4	António Ramalho Eanes	9 years, 238 days	2	Nonpartisan → Democratic Renewal
5	Francisco Craveiro Lopes	7 years, 0 days	1	National Union
6	António José de Almeida	4 years, 0 days	1	Evolutionist → Republican Liberal
7	Manuel de Arriaga	3 years, 278 days	1	Republican → Democratic
8	Bernardino Machado	2 years, 239 days	2	Democratic
9	Manuel Teixeira Gomes	2 year, 67 days	1	Democratic
10	Francisco da Costa Gomes	1 year, 288 days	1	Nonpartisan
11	Teófilo Braga	1 year, 87 days	1	Republican → Democratic
12	Sidónio Pais	1 year, 2 days	1	National Republican
13	João do Canto e Castro	295 days	1	National Republican
14	António José Seguro	215 days (Incumbent)	1	Socialist
15	António de Spínola	158 days	1	Nonpartisan
16	António de Oliveira Salazar	113 days	1	National Union
17	Manuel Gomes da Costa	22 days	1	Nonpartisan
18	José Mendes Cabeçadas	17 days	1	Nonpartisan

== See also ==
- President of Portugal
- First Lady of Portugal
- List of heads of state of Portugal
- List of prime ministers of Portugal
- List of Portuguese monarchs
- List of Portuguese royal consorts
- Prime Minister of Portugal
- Politics of Portugal
- History of Portugal
  - History of Portugal (1910–1926)
  - History of Portugal (1926–1932)
  - History of Portugal (1932–1974)
  - History of Portugal (1974–1986)
  - History of Portugal (1986–2000)
  - History of Portugal (2000–present)
- Timeline of Portuguese history

== Notes ==
^{[A]} Assassinated.
^{[D]} Died in office of natural causes.
^{[R]} Resigned.
^{[C]} Forced to resign due to a coup d'état.
