= Congress of the Republic (Portugal) =

Legislative body of the First Portuguese Republic

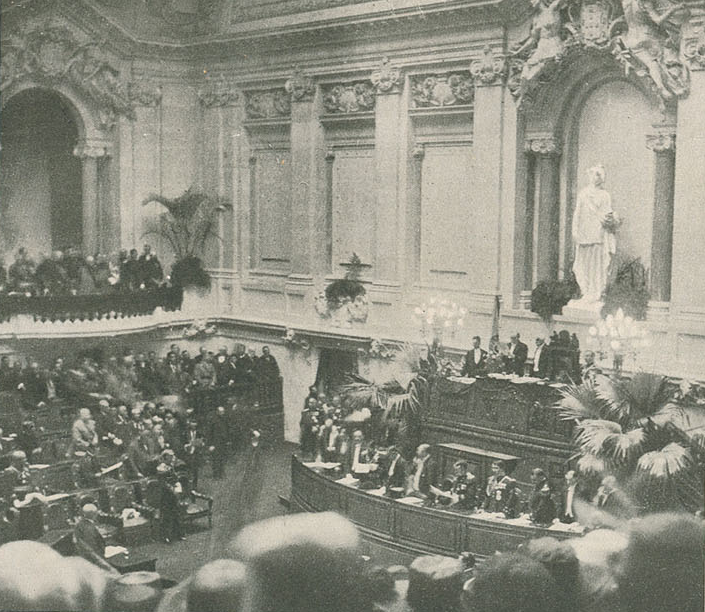
Presidential inauguration of António José de Almeida at the meeting chamber of the Congress, 5 October 1919

The Congress of the Republic (Portuguese: Congresso da República) was the legislative body of the First Portuguese Republic.

It was proposed by Machado Santos. The Congress was formed by two chambers, the Senate and the Chamber of Deputies. The home of the Congress was the Palácio de São Bento, the current home of the Assembly of the Republic, in Lisbon.

== See also ==
- First Portuguese Republic
- Constitution of Portugal (1911)
