= 1925 Portuguese legislative election =

- 8 November 1925

All 163 seats in the Chamber of Deputies 82 seats needed for a majority
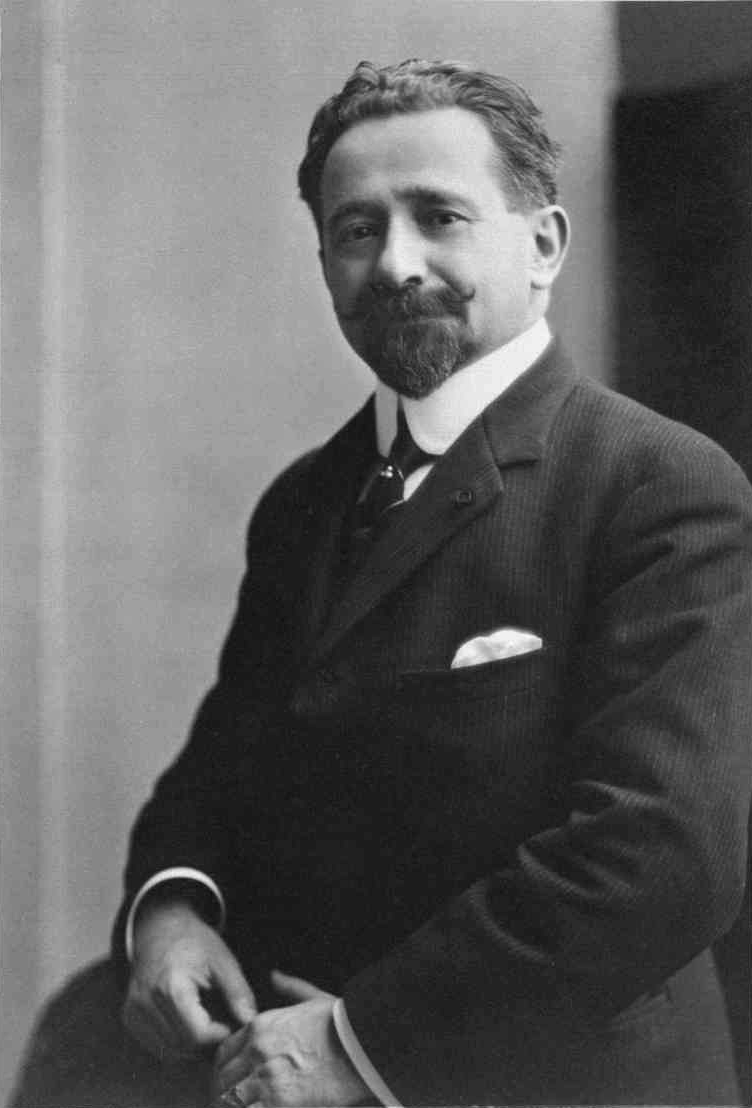

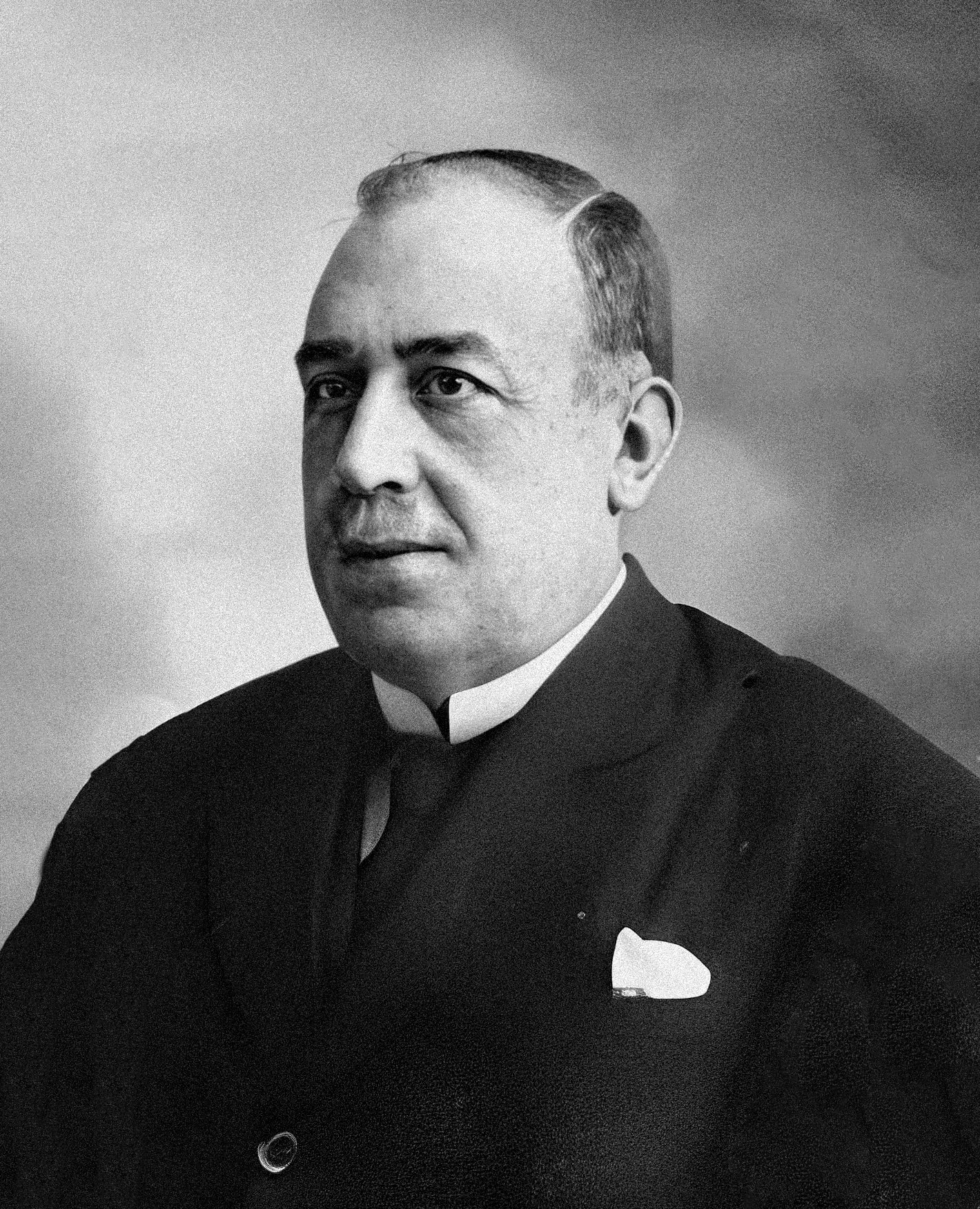

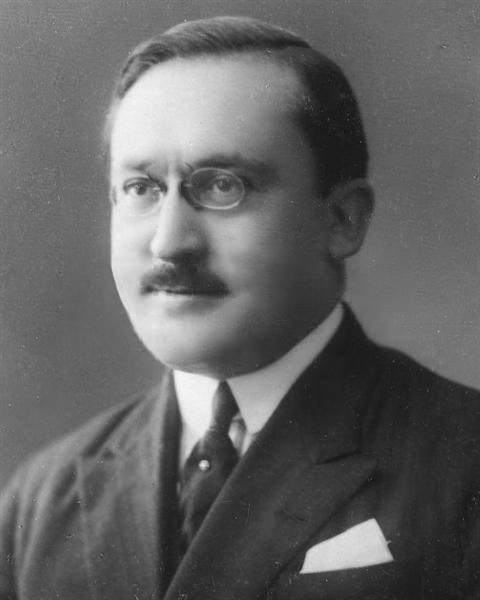

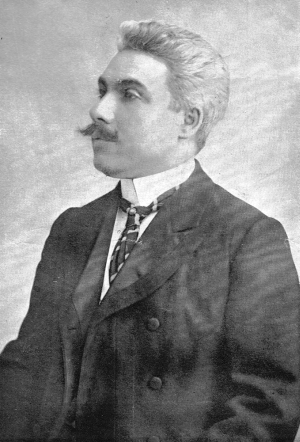
	First party	Second party	Third party
			CMC
Leader	Afonso Costa	António Ginestal Machado
Party	Democratic	PRN	CM
Last election	74 seats	51 seats (Note: Combined results of the Republican Liberal Party and Reconstitution Party who merged prior to the election.)	13 seats
Seats won	83	36	7
Seat change	▲9	▼15	▼6
	Fourth party	Fifth party	Sixth party
		UIE
Leader	José Domingues dos Santos		António Lino Neto
Party	PRED	UIE	PCC
Last election	–	–	5 seats
Seats won	6	6	4
Seat change	New	New	▼1
Prime Minister before election
Domingos Leite Pereira
Democratic
Prime Minister after election
Domingos Leite Pereira
Democratic

Parliamentary elections were held in Portugal on 8 November 1925. The result was a victory for the Democratic Party, which won 83 of the 163 seats in the Chamber of Deputies and 39 of the 70 seats in the Senate. Following a military coup in 1926 and the subsequent Estado Novo period, the 1925 elections were the last truly multi-party elections in Portugal until the 1975 Constituent Assembly elections.

== Background ==
In the 1922 parliamentary elections the Democratic Party emerged as the largest party but failed to win a majority of seats. Party leader Afonso Costa subsequently chose not to form government. Instead, António Maria da Silva, also of the Democratic Party, became Prime Minister on 6 February, leading a minority government supported by the Reconstitution Party, the Catholic Centre Party, the Regionalist Party and several independents. However, his government failed to serve a full term after being forced to resign following a motion of no confidence in November 1923. Further instability resulted in seven different governments holding office in the subsequent period until the 1925 elections.

== Contesting parties ==
=== Nationalist Republican Party ===
The Republican Liberal Party (PLR) emerged as the largest party following the 1921 elections, narrowly falling short of winning majorities in both chambers of parliament. However, in the 1922 elections they finished a distant second to the Democratic Party. This defeat led to the PLR seeking other ways of forming a conservative republican coalition capable of defeating the Democratic Party and holding onto power.

On 14 May 1922, the PLR convinced Francisco Cunha Leal to join the party. This was viewed as a significant moment, as Cunha Leal was perceived as a hero by PLR members, having tried to save PLR leader António Granjo from assassination during the Bloody Night. After some failed attempts at negotiation with the Reconstitution Party, on 2 December 1922 the two parties formed a coalition in the Chamber of Deputies, led by Álvaro de Castro. This coalition was able to get Alfredo de Sá Cardoso elected President of the Chamber of Deputies due to some representatives of other parties not being present. The two parties formed a coalition in the Senate ten days later. On 4 January 1923 the two parties formally merged, forming the Nationalist Republican Party.

At the end of March 1923, members of other small parties such as the Reformist Party (previously led by António Machado Santos) and the National Republican Federation also decided to join the NRP.

=== Democratic Leftwing Republican Party ===
In July 1925, a group of left-wing members of the Democratic Party joined the opposition and voted in favour of a motion of no confidence in António Maria da Silva's government. They were subsequently forced to resign from the Democratic Party and went on to form their own party, the Democratic Leftwing Republican Party.

=== Union of Economic Interests ===
During the First Portuguese Republic, associations of employers took two different approaches to promote their interests. Before 1924, they attempted to exert political power indirectly, by influencing the government and its economic policies. After 1924, they form the Union of Economic Interests (UEI) as an attempt to exert political power directly. The UEI was led by the Commercial Association of Lisbon and also included members of other employer associations, including the União Agrária (Agrarian Union), the Associação Industrial Portuguesa (Portuguese Industrial Association) and the Associação Comercial de Lojistas (Commercial Association of Shopkeepers). Part of the UEI's political strategy included the acquisition of newspapers, including O Primeiro de Janeiro, the Diário de Notícias and O Século.

== Results ==
=== Chamber of Deputies ===
Party	Votes	%	Seats	+/–
Democratic Party			83	+9
Nationalist Republican Party			36	–15
Monarchist Cause			7	–6
Democratic Leftwing Republican Party			6	New
Union of Economic Interests			6	–1
Portuguese Catholic Centre			4	+2
Portuguese Socialist Party			2	New
Other parties and independents			19	+1
Total			163	0
Total votes	407,960	–		
Registered voters/turnout	574,260	71.04		
Source: Nohlen & Stöver

=== Senate ===
Party	Votes	%	Seats	+/–
Democratic Party			39	–13
Nationalist Republican Party			8	+2
Monarchist Cause			5	+1
Portuguese Catholic Centre			1	0
Democratic Leftwing Republican Party			0	New
Portuguese Socialist Party			0	0
Union of Economic Interests			0	0
Other parties and independents			12	+5
Total			65	–5
Registered voters/turnout	574,260	–		
Source: Nohlen & Stöver
