= 1922 Portuguese legislative election =

- 29 January 1922

All 163 seats in the Chamber of Deputies 82 seats needed for a majority
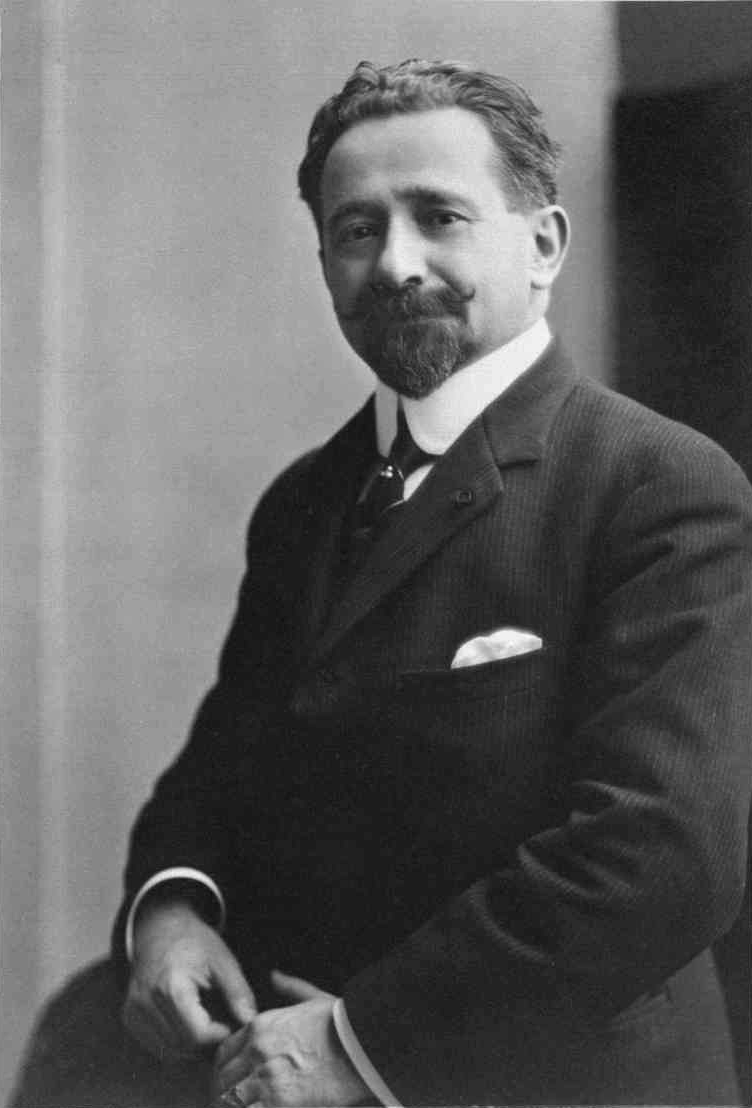

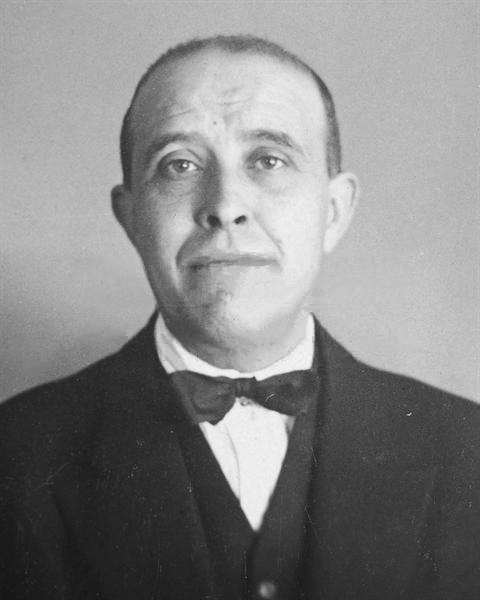

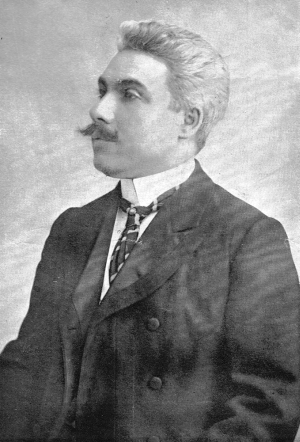
| | First party | Second party | Third party |
|---|---|---|---|
| | | PLR |
| Leader | Afonso Costa | | Álvaro de Castro |
| Party | Democratic | PLR | Reconstitution |
| Last election | 54 seats | 79 seats | 12 seats |
| Seats won | 74 | 34 | 17 |
| Seat change | ▲20 | ▼45 | ▲5 |
| | Fourth party | Fifth party | Sixth party |
| | CMC | | Reg |
| Leader | | António Lino Neto |
| Party | CM | PCC | Regionalist |
| Last election | 4 seats | 3 seats | 2 seats |
| Seats won | 13 | 5 | 2 |
| Seat change | ▲9 | ▲2 | Steady |
Prime Minister before election
Francisco Cunha Leal
Democratic
Prime Minister after election
Francisco Cunha Leal
Democratic

Parliamentary elections were held in Portugal on 29 January 1922. The Democratic Party emerged as the largest in Parliament, winning 74 of the 163 seats in the House of Representatives and 37 of the 70 seats in the Senate.

== Background ==
The elections were held less than a year after the July 1921 legislative elections, in which the Republican Liberal Party (PLR) had won a majority of votes. However, on 19 October 1921 ("the night of blood"), a military coup resulted in several republican figures being killed, including PLR prime minister António Granjo. On the night of blood, President António José de Almeida invested Manuel Maria Coelho as Prime Minister, but his government resigned on 3 November. On the same day, Carlos Maia Pinto became Prime Minister, but also resigned on 16 December. Francisco Cunha Leal then served as Prime Minister until the elections. The elections took place amidst instability and violence and were postponed four times before finally taking place on 29 January.

== Results ==
=== Chamber of Deputies ===
| Party | Seats | +/– |
|---|---|---|
| Democratic Party | 74 | +20 |
| Republican Liberal Party | 34 | –45 |
| Reconstitution Party | 17 | +5 |
| Monarchist Cause | 13 | +9 |
| Portuguese Catholic Centre | 5 | +2 |
| Portuguese Socialist Party | 0 | –8 |
| Regionalist Party | 2 | 0 |
| Other parties and independents | 18 | +9 |
| Total | 163 | 0 |
Source: Nohlen & Stöver

=== Senate ===
| Party | Seats | +/– |
|---|---|---|
| Democratic Party | 37 | –21 |
| Republican Liberal Party | 11 | +15 |
| Reconstitution Party | 10 | +3 |
| Monarchist Cause | 4 | +4 |
| Portuguese Catholic Centre | 1 | –2 |
| Portuguese Socialist Party | 0 | 0 |
| Regionalist Party | 0 | 0 |
| Other parties and independents | 7 | 0 |
| Total | 70 | –1 |
Source: Nohlen & Stöver

== Aftermath ==
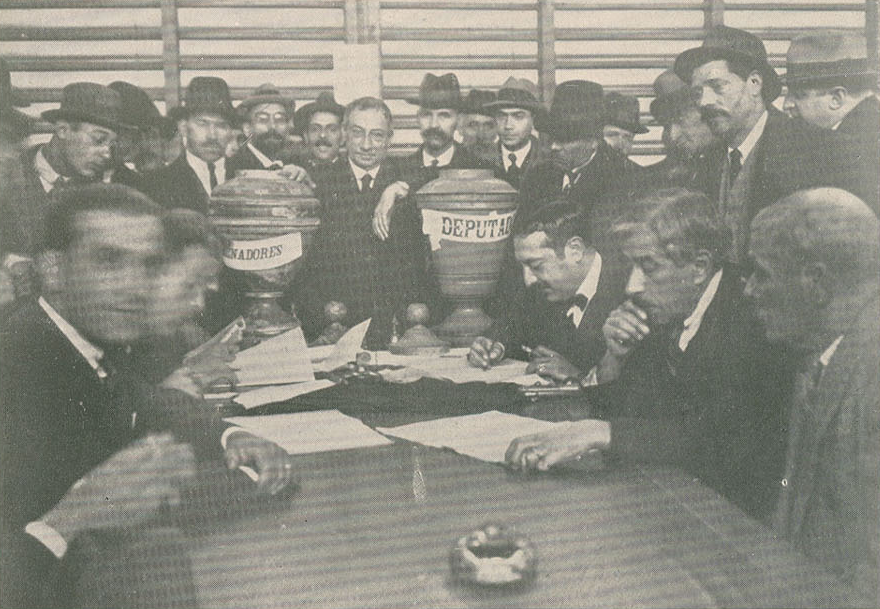
Vote count in a Lisbon polling place

The Democratic Party failed to win an absolute majority of seats and Afonso Costa chose not to form government. Instead, António Maria da Silva of the Democratic Party became Prime Minister on 6 February, leading a minority government with the support of the Reconstitution Party, the Catholic Centre Party, the Regionalist Party and some independents. However, the government failed to serve a full term after being forced to resign following a motion of no confidence in November 1923. Further instability resulted in seven different governments holding office in the subsequent period until the 1925 elections.
