= List of international presidential trips made by António José Seguro =

This is a list of international presidential trips made by António José Seguro, the President of Portugal.

== 2026 ==
Country	Locations	Date	Details
Spain	Madrid	20 April	Visit to Spain to meet King Felipe VI and Prime Minister Pedro Sánchez.
Italy	Florence, Rome	7 May	Took part in the 50th anniversary of the European University Institute. Met with President Sergio Mattarella in Rome.
Luxembourg	Luxembourg	5–7 June	Three days visit for the commemorations of Portugal Day. Met with Grand-Duke Guillaume V and Prime Minister Luc Frieden.
Italy	Venice	16–17 June	Took part of the COTEC Europe Summit.
United States	Miami	25–28 June	Attended the Portugal vs. Colombia match of the 2026 World Cup. Visited the Portuguese community in Miami.
Spain	Barcelona	1 July	Took part of a ceremony to pay tribute to architect Eduardo Souto de Moura. Met with President of the Government of Catalonia Salvador Illa.
France	Paris	2 July	Met with President Emmanuel Macron.
Cape Verde	Praia, Tarrafal, Cidade Velha	21–23 July	Three days state visit. Met with President José Maria Neves. Addressed the National Assembly of Cape Verde. Visited the Museum of Resistance in Tarrafal and the Cidade Velha. Received the keys to the city of Praia and was condecorated with the Order of Amílcar Cabral.
Vatican City	Vatican City	23–24 Sep	Met with Pope Leo XIV. Later met with the Secretary for Relations with States Archbishop Paul Gallagher
France	Strasbourg	30 Sep	Took part of the commemorations of the 50th anniversary of the Council of Europe.
Slovenia	Ljubljana	15–16 Oct	Took part of the 21st Arraiolos Group Summit.

== See also ==
- List of international presidential trips made by Aníbal Cavaco Silva
- List of international presidential trips made by António José de Almeida
- List of international presidential trips made by Bernardino Machado
- List of international presidential trips made by Francisco Craveiro Lopes
- List of international presidential trips made by Marcelo Rebelo de Sousa
- List of international presidential trips made by Mário Soares
