= Union of Economic Interests =

The Union of Economic Interests (Portuguese: União dos Interesses Económicos, UIE) was a right-wing political party in Portugal. It was officially established in 1925, and represented the interests of conservative bankers, businessmen and managers. It only took part in the 1925 elections, in which it won six seats in the House of Representatives. It was officially disbanded in 1937, during the Estado Novo.

== Background ==
During the First Portuguese Republic, employers started to feel the necessity of becoming politically organized following the events of the Bloody Night. Employers' associations took two different approaches to promoting their interests; before 1924 they attempted to exert political power indirectly, by influencing the government and its economic policies. After 1924, they formed the Union of Economic Interests as an attempt to exert political power directly. There were growing tensions between big business and the republican government that came to a head after the introduction of an alcoholic beverages and perfume tax in August 1924.

== History ==
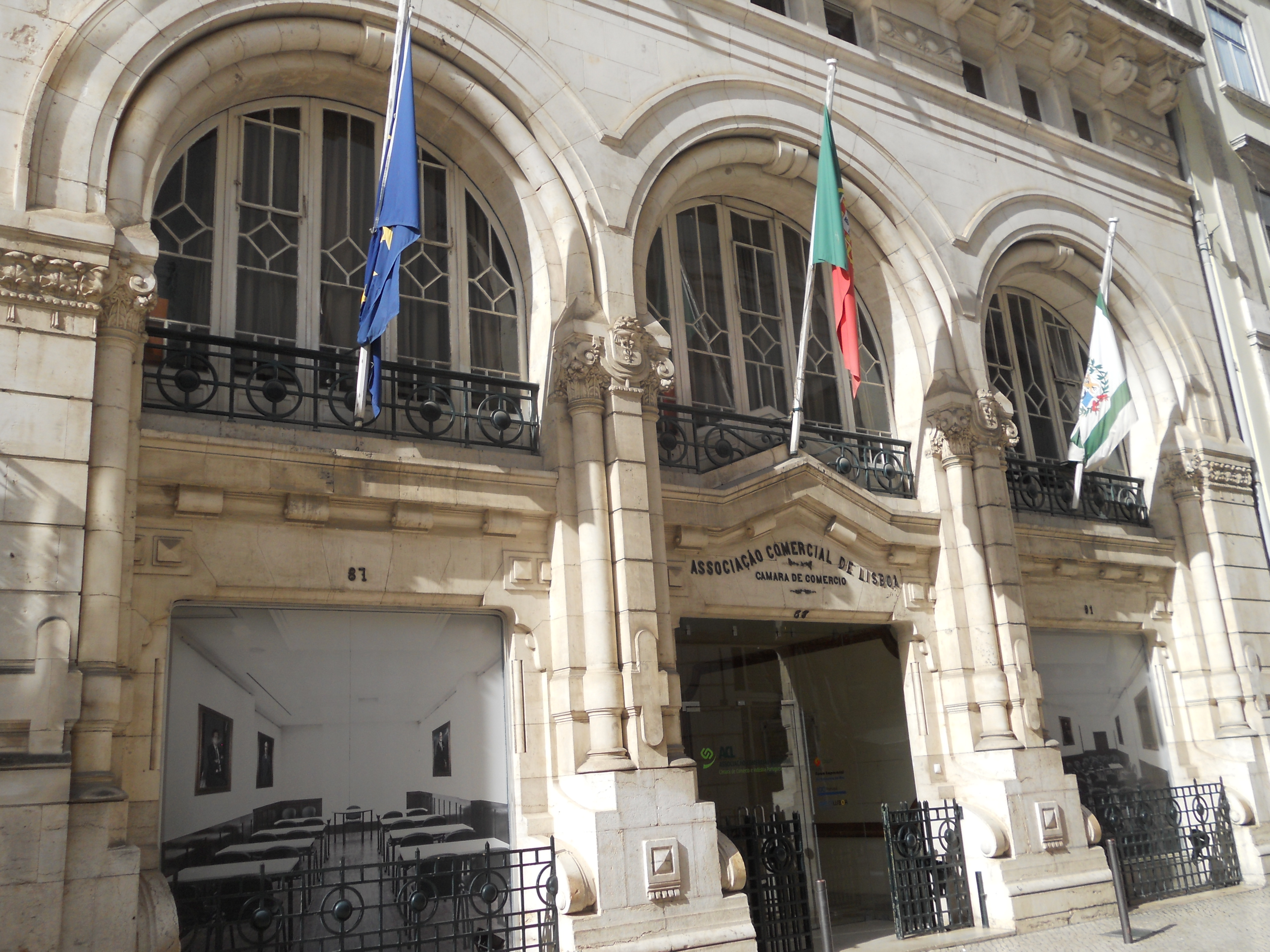
Main facade of the Commercial Association of Lisbon's headquarters (1922 - present)

The UIE was led by the Commercial Association of Lisbon (ACL) and also included members of other employer associations, including the Agrarian Union (AU), the Portuguese Industrial Association (AIP) and the Commercial Association of Shopkeepers (ACLo). They decided to form the party on 28 September 1924.

Part of the UIE's political strategy included the acquisition of newspapers, such as O Primeiro de Janeiro, the Diário de Notícias and O Século. From 1 October 1924, O Século regularly published interviews with UIE members, starting with Alfredo Augusto Ferreira of ACL. On 10 October, the ACL held a meeting at which it was decided that it would cut all ties with the government and close business in protest. Protests were held outside the meeting and ACL leader José Pereira da Rosa was jailed, before being released five days later after paying bail. At this point, the UIE had the support of the Monarchist Cause and the Nationalist Republican Party.

With the 1925 parliamentary elections approaching, the UIE formed a Central Council to organize internal elections in December 1924. This Central Council was formed by João Pereira da Rosa (ACL), Levi Marques da Costa (AIP), Alfredo Ferreira (ACL), Carlos de Oliveira (ACL), Roque da Fonseca (ACL), Nunes Mexia (AU), César Azevedo (AIP), António de Assis Camilo (ACL), Eduardo Maria Rodrigues (ACLo) and Afonso Galvão de Castro. Th UIE also had district, municipal and parish-level leaders.

On 5 February 1925, the government shut the ACL down due to its "attitude of true rebellion against the established powers". It would only reopen on 11 July of the same year. Weeks later, an attempt was made to bomb the UIE's provisional headquarters in Porto . The party's campaign lost steam, but continued, focusing on the promotion of national production, less state intervention, and greater collaboration with workers.

On 18 April 1925, a conservative coup attempt was made led by General Sinel de Cordes. It was supported by monarchist, nationalist, and integralist military members. O Século was suspected of being involved in the coup attempt and was shut down for 18 days. Carlos de Oliveira was arrested, after incriminating evidence that connected him to the coup was found in his home. Another coup attempt took place on 19 July 1925 after some military officials managed to escape from the Fort of São Julião da Barra, which was defended by O Século.

In the 8 November 1925 elections, the UIE won four to six seats in the House of Representatives and zero to one in the Senate. The recorded names of elected members are:

- Joaquim Nunes Mexia (Évora electoral circle)
- Eduardo Fernandes de Oliveira (Elvas)
- José Rosado da Fonseca (Estremoz)
- Severino Santana Marques (Portalegre)
- José Maria Álvares

The party supported the 28 May 1926 coup, and did not contest any further elections. It was officially disbanded in 1937, during the Estado Novo.

== Election results ==
Election	House of Representatives		Senate	
Election	Seats	+/–	Seats	+/–
1925	6 / 163	New	0 / 65	New
Source: Nohlen & Stöver

== See also ==
- Reich Party of the German Middle Class
- Economic Party
