= 1910s in Angola =

Angola-related events during the 1910s

In the 1910s in Angola the colonial government transitioned from a monarchy to republican rule following a coup d'état in October 1910. The Portuguese First Republic, the new state, re-abolished slavery.

== Slavery ==
Republicans overthrew King Manuel II in 1910. Slaves in Moçâmedes, among other cities in Angola, campaigned for abolition and manumission. In some areas slaves declared strikes, hoping the economic slowdown would force political changes. Carvalhal Correia Henriques, the new governor of Moçâmedes, supported the slaves' cause and directed labor complaints his way. The Portuguese slave owners whose businesses depended on the slaves used their political clout to lobby the Portuguese government to fire Henriques. The government complied, dismissing him in January 1912.

== Colonial governors ==
- José Augusto Alves Roçadas (1909 to 1910)
- Caetano Francisco Cláudio Eugénio Gonçalves (1910 to 1911)
- Manuel Maria Coelho (1911 to 1912)
- José Norton de Matos (1912 to 1915)
- António Júlio da Costa Pereira de Eça (1915 to 1916)
- Pedro Francisco Massano de Amorim (1916 to 1917)
- Jaime Alberto de Castro Morais (1917 to 1918)
- Filomeno da Câmara Melo Cabral (1918 to 1919)
- Jack Rossi (1919 to 1920)

== See also ==
- History of Portugal
- Portuguese West Africa
