= 1921 Portuguese legislative election =

- 10 July 1921

All 163 seats in the Chamber of Deputies 82 seats needed for a majority
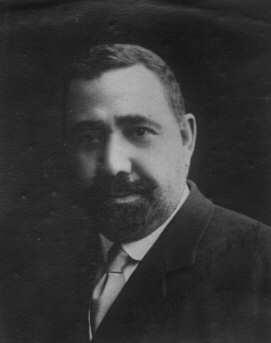

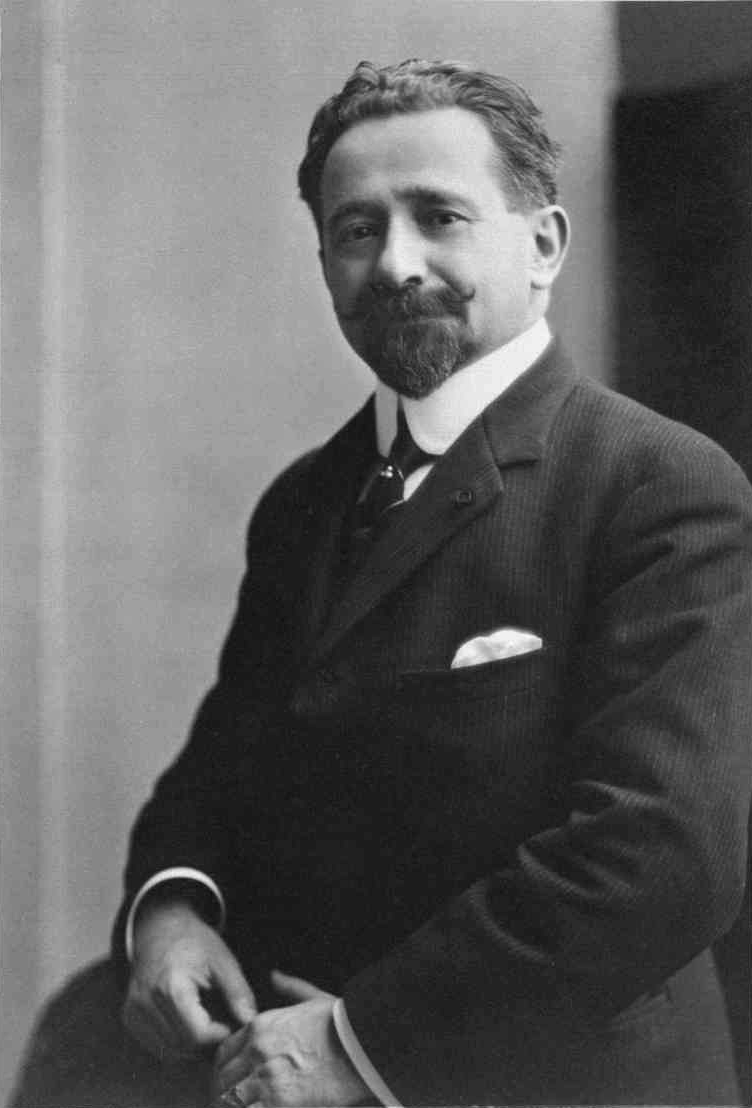

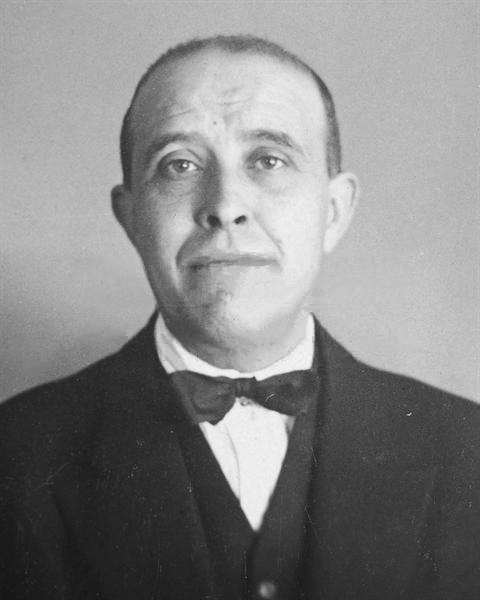
	First party	Second party	Third party
Leader	António Granjo	Afonso Costa	Álvaro de Castro
Party	PLR	Democratic	Reconstitution
Last election	55 seats (Note: Combined results of the Evolutionist Party and Republican Union who merged to form the Republican Liberal Party)	86 seats	–
Seats won	79	54	12
Seat change	▲24	▼32	New
	Fourth party	Fifth party	Sixth party
	CMC	PCC	Reg
Leader		António Lino Neto
Party	CM	PCC	Regionalist
Last election	Did not contest	1 seat	–
Seats won	4	3	2
Seat change	New	▲2	New
Prime Minister before election
Tomé José de Barros Queirós
PLR
Prime Minister after election
António Granjo
PLR

Parliamentary elections were held in Portugal on 10 July 1921. Prior to the elections, the Republican Union had merged with the Evolutionist Party to form the Republican Liberal Party (PLR). The elections resulted in the PLR becoming the largest in Parliament, winning 79 of the 163 seats in the House of Representatives and 32 of the 71 seats in the Senate.

The government that was subsequently formed lasted only a few months, as on 19 October (the "night of blood"), a military coup resulted in the deaths of several prominent conservative figures including prime minister António Granjo. New elections were held in January 1922.

== Results ==
=== Chamber of Deputies ===
Party	Seats	+/–
Republican Liberal Party	79	+24
Democratic Party	54	–32
Reconstitution Party	12	New
Monarchist Cause	4	–
Portuguese Catholic Centre	3	+2
Portuguese Socialist Party	0	–8
Regionalist Party	2	New
Other parties and independents	9	–4
Total	163	0
Source: Nohlen & Stöver

=== Senate ===
Party	Seats	+/–
Republican Liberal Party	32	+5
Democratic Party	22	–14
Reconstitution Party	7	New
Portuguese Catholic Centre	3	+2
Monarchist Cause	0	–
Portuguese Socialist Party	0	0
Regionalist Party	0	New
Other parties and independents	7	0
Total	71	0
Source: Nohlen & Stöver
