= Sara Beirão =

Portuguese feminist author

- Born: Sarah de Vasconcelos Carvalho Beirão; 30 July 1880; Tábua, Portugal
- Died: 21 May 1974 (aged 93); Tábua
- Occupations: Author, journalist
- Known for: Feminist campaigning

Sara Beirão (1880 - 1974) was a Portuguese writer, journalist, women's rights activist and philanthropist. As an author, she is particularly known for fiction aimed at children and youth and for her work as publisher and editor of the Alma feminina feminist magazine.

== Early years ==
Sarah de Vasconcelos Carvalho Beirão (she used "Sara" professionally) was born on 30 July 1880, in Tábua, Portugal. She was the daughter of Maria José da Costa Mathias and Doctor Francisco de Vasconcellos Carvalho Beirão. She studied in Porto, receiving an education available to very few girls at that time, and began working for newspapers at the age of 18, namely for the periodical O Tabuense, founded by her father, as well as for newspapers in Beira Alta Province and for the magazine Humanidade, using the male the pseudonym of Álvaro de Vasconcelos.

== Activism ==
In May 1909, Beirão became actively involved in the Republican cause, assisting in the organization at the first republican rally held in Tábua, and taking part in the inauguration of the Centro Republicano Tabuense, chaired by her father. Republicans in Portugal at that time were aiming to substitute the Constitutional Monarchy by a Republic. In the same month, she joined the Portuguese League of Peace, which emphasised the achievement of peace through the efforts of women, as well as the Republican League of Portuguese Women, becoming president of the Tábua branch.

In 1910, Beirão married António da Costa Carvalho. The couple moved to the Portuguese capital Lisbon in 1928, where she joined the “Group of Thirteen” (Grupo das Treze), a women’s organization that aimed to combat the ignorance and superstition, dogmatism and religious conservatism that existed in Portuguese society and that prevented women’s emancipation. She also joined the Conselho Nacional das Mulheres Portuguesas (National Council of Portuguese Women), founded by activist doctor Adelaide Cabete in 1914. Beirão was to become president on the death of Cabete and held the position from 1935 to 1941, being honorary president in 1942.

In addition to her activism in the defence of women's rights and gender equality, Beirão was also a philanthropist, focusing on helping the most disadvantaged children and the elderly. The Sarah Beirão and António Costa Carvalho Foundation was created in 1964, to operate a care home in Tábua for retired artists and writers of both sexes. This was mainly for long-term residents with physical or economic difficulties and was housed in an 18th century manor house, home of Beirão's grandparents and her birthplace. It currently supports around 100 residents and day-care patients.

== Writing ==
In literature, Sara Beirão wrote mostly fiction, for both adults and children. As one of the most successful Portuguese writers during the 20th century, she published 16 books, including two collections of short stories. Her works were represented at the “Exhibition of Books Written by Women” organized by Maria Lamas and the Conselho Nacional das Mulheres Portuguesas in 1947. This brought together three thousand books by 1400 women authors from thirty countries, and filled the Great Hall of Fine Arts at the University of Lisbon. She contributed to several newspapers and magazines, such as O Primeiro de Janeiro in Porto, Diário de Coimbra in Coimbra, and Jornal de Notícias and Diário de Notícias in Lisbon, as well as for the Brazilian print media. Her articles and regular columns were usually targeted at women. From the mid-1930s she was Director and Editor of, and regular contributor to, Alma Feminina magazine, published by the Conselho Nacional das Mulheres Portuguesas until that organization was closed by the authoritarian Estado Novo regime in 1947. Many of its articles were dedicated to Portuguese feminists such as Adelaide Cabete, Ana de Castro Osório, and Elina Guimarães and well as those from outside Portugal, such as Avril de Sainte-Croix, Jane Addams, and Simone de Beauvoir.

Beirão died in Tábua, on 21 May 1974, at the age of 93. She is remembered in that city by a public garden (Jardim Sarah Beirão) and streets have been named after her in several other locations.

== List of publications ==
Books published by Sara Beirão are listed below.

- Serões da Beira (1929);
- Cenas Portuguesas (1930);
- Amores no Campo (1931);
- Raul (1934);
- Os Fidalgos da Torre (1936);
- O Solar da Boa Vista (1937)
- Clara (1939)
- Sozinha (1940);
- Surpresa Bendita (1941);
- Alvorada (1943);
- Prometida (1944);
- Triunfo (1950s);
- Manuel Vai Correr Mundo (1950s);
- Um Divórcio (1950);
- Destinos (1955);
- A Luta (1972).
