= Bloody Night (Lisbon, 1921) =

October 1921 radical revolt

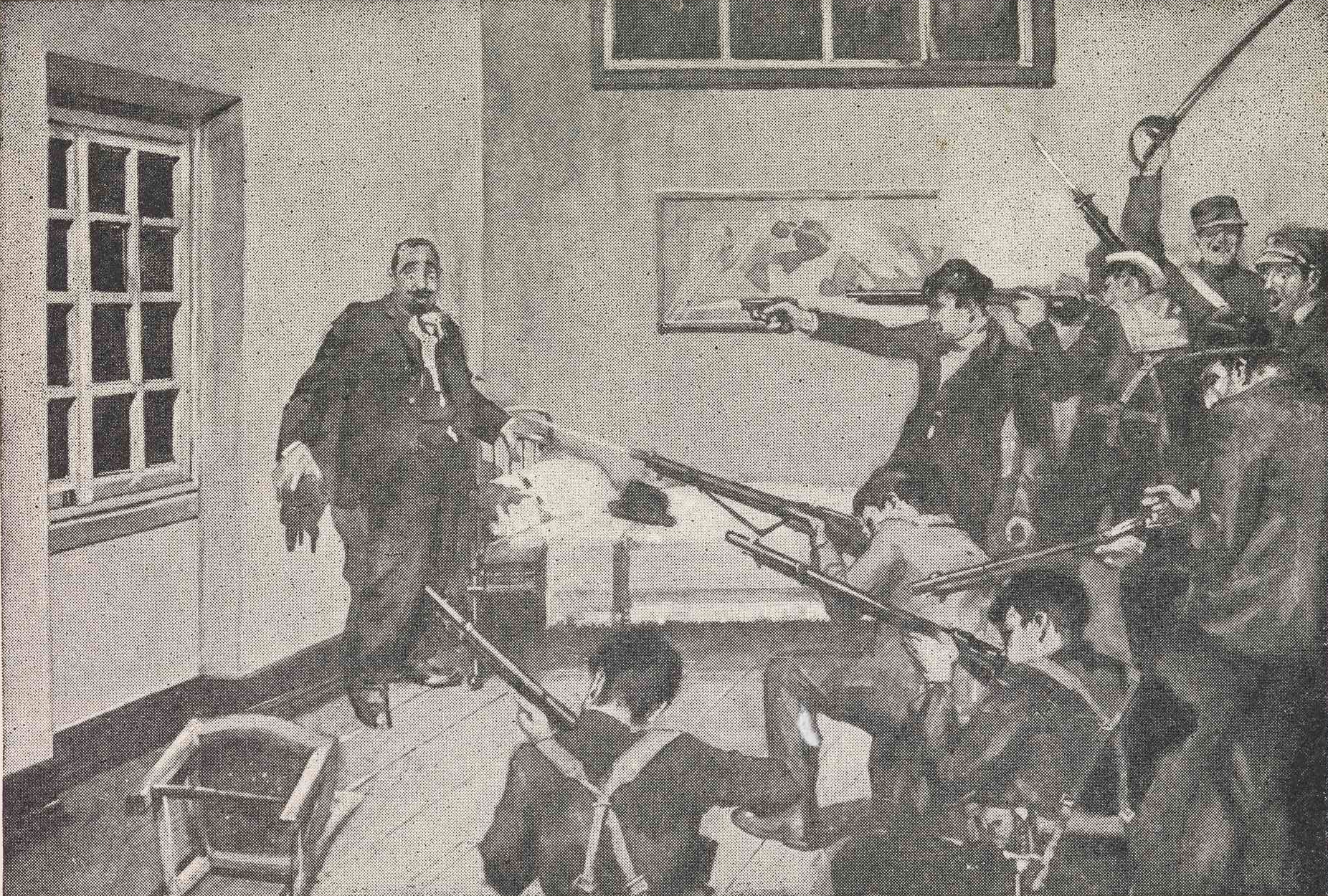
- Prime Minister António Granjo is shot by the rebels
- Date: 19 October 1921
- Location: Lisbon, Portugal
- Result: 1922 Portuguese legislative election

Parties
Rioting members of the Army, Navy, and GNR soldiers	Portuguese Government

Lead figures
Corporal Abel Olímpio	Prime Minister António Granjo (executed); António Machado Santos (executed); Carlos da Maia (executed); Freitas da Silva (executed); Colonel Botelho de Vasconcelos (executed); Francisco Cunha Leal

Casualties and losses
	6 dead, 1 injured

Bloody Night (Portuguese: Noite Sangrenta) is the name by which the radical revolt that took place in Lisbon, on the night of 19 October 1921, became known. During the day, a coup led António Granjo's government to resign, but President António José de Almeida resisted appointing the rebels' government. During the night, a riot led by a "ghost truck" led by Abel Olímpio resulted in five people associated with the Sidonist regime being killed and one being gravely injured.

== Background ==
António Granjo became prime minister after the 1921 Portuguese legislative election on 10 July gave his party (Republican Liberal Party) a plurality, the first time the Democratic Party had not won election since the 5 October 1910 revolution. Immediately thereafter, Republican radicals, which included the National Republican Guard, started to plot against the new government.

== Coup ==
Between 5 and 6 a.m. 19 October 1921, civilians, members of the National Republican Guard and the Navy gathered in Terreiro do Paço, and went up the Avenida da Liberdade, establishing positions and artillery in the Edward VII Park. Colonel Manuel Maria Coelho led the rebel forces during the coup. As the sun rose, the artillery signaled the beginning of the hostilities and NRP Vasco da Gama replied back, signalling the support of the navy ships in Tagus. Unable to resist, the government of António Granjo handed its resignation to President António José de Almeida. Yet, as night fell, Portugal was still without a government as President José de Almeida resisted appointing the government the rebels wanted.

== Riot ==
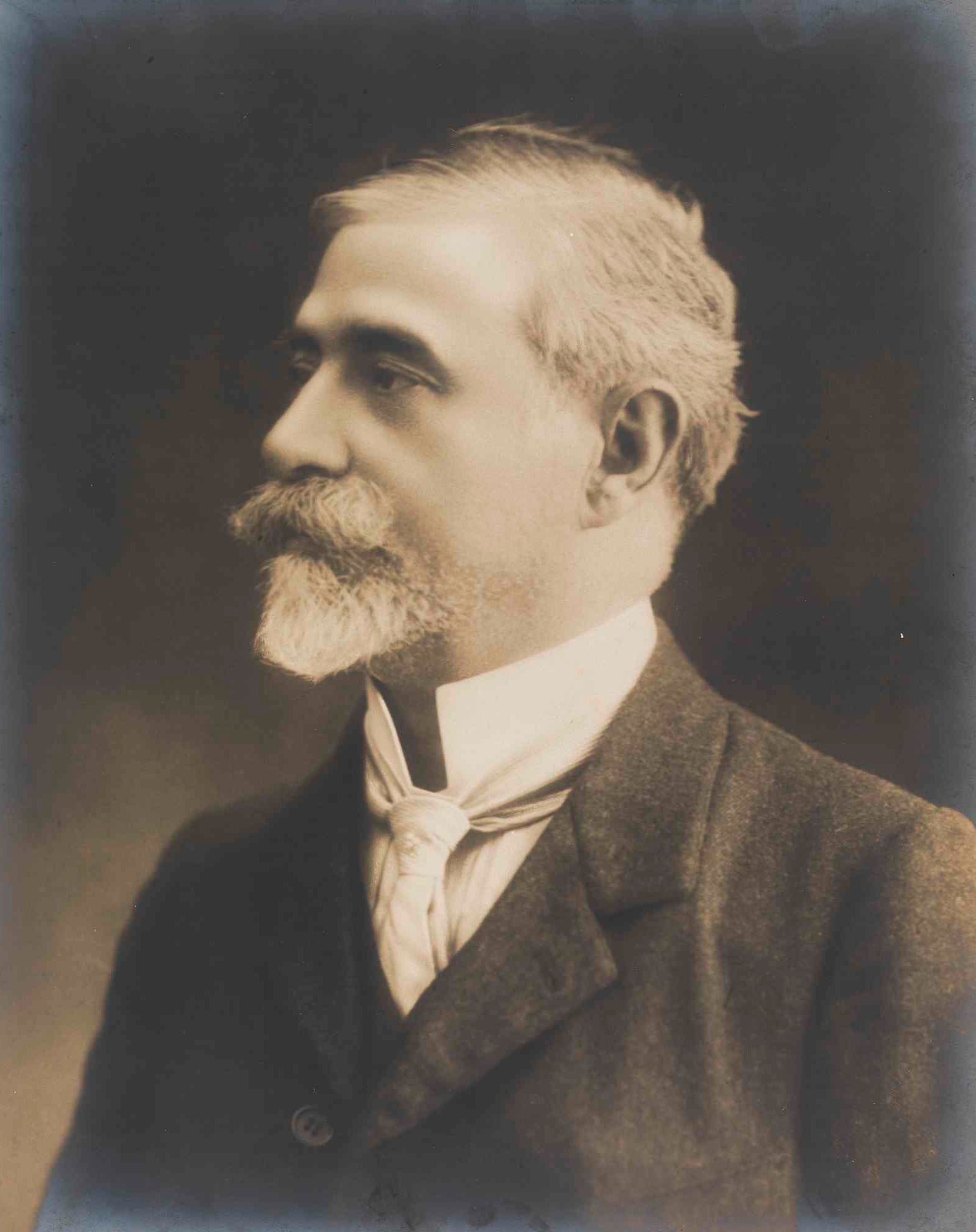
Colonel Manuel Maria Coelho

As night fell, a "ghost truck", led by Abel Olímpio, roamed Lisbon with the aim of murdering a list of notable people. The first to be killed was António Granjo, who fled from his home in Rua João Crisóstomo and hid in Francisco Pinto da Cunha Leal's (who had ties with the revolutionary movement) nearby house, in Avenida Miguel Bombarda. When the rebels found Granjo, they forced Cunha Leal to hand him over. The rebels were purportedly taking Granjo to the NRP Vasco da Gama, but rebels tried to kill him as he reached Terreiro do Paço. He was then shot in the neck as he neared the boarding bridge near the Navy Arsenal. Some military rebels tried to pull him inside the Navy Arsenal, but the mob succeeded in killing him with guns and swords. Cunha Leal was wounded while trying to defend Granjo. Then, José Carlos da Maia was also killed near the Navy Arsenal. António Machado Santos was killed in the early hours of 20 October 1921 in Largo do Intendente. Freitas da Silva was shot and died in hospital. Colonel Botelho de Vasconcelos and a driver called Carlos Gentil were also killed. The riot appeared to have targeted Sidonist politicians, except for Granjo.

== Aftermath ==
The same night, President António José de Almeida invested Manuel Maria Coelho as Prime Minister, but his government resigned on 3 November. On the same day, Carlos Maia Pinto became Prime Minister, but also resigned on 16 December. Francisco Cunha Leal then served as Prime Minister until the elections. The 1922 Portuguese legislative elections took place amidst instability and violence and were postponed four times before finally taking place on 29 January.

== Cultural references ==
The events of the bloody night are the main plot of a two-episode TV series that was broadcast by Rádio e Televisão de Portugal called Noite Sangrenta.
