= Tábua =

- Municipality
- Town of Tábua
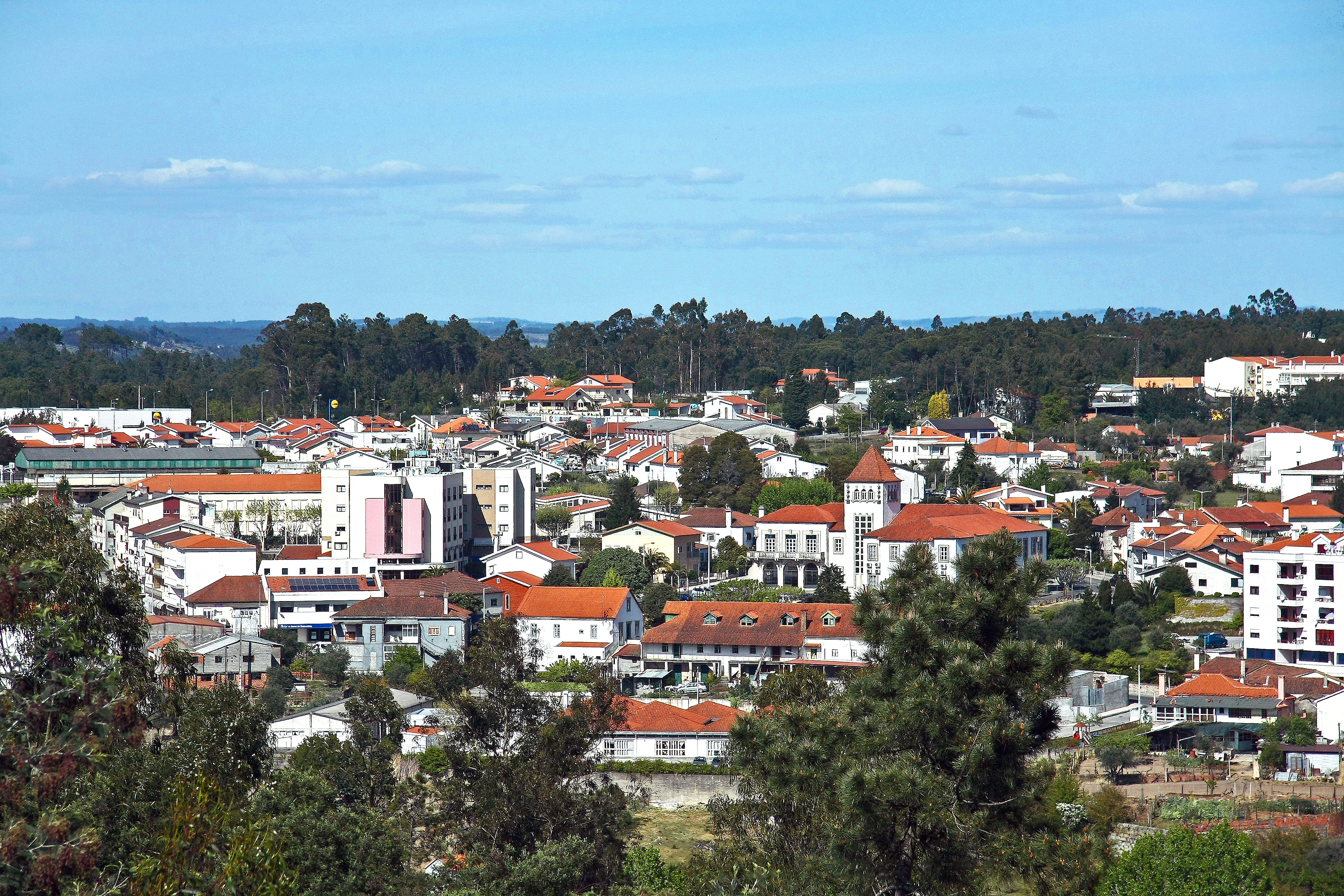
- Partial view of Tábua

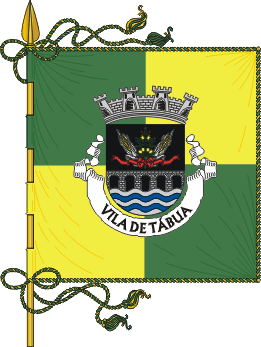
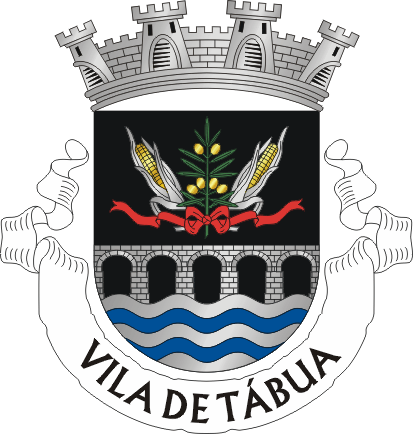
- Flag Coat of arms
- Interactive map of Tábua
- Coordinates: 40°21′37″N 8°01′45″W
- Country: Portugal
- Region: Centro
- Intermunic. comm.: Região de Coimbra
- District: Coimbra
- Parishes: 11

Area
  - Total: 199.79 km^{2} (77.14 sq mi)

Population (2021)
  - Total: 11,160
  - Density: 55.86/km^{2} (144.7/sq mi)
- Time zone: UTC+00:00 (WET)
  - Summer (DST): UTC+01:00 (WEST)
- Website: www.cm-tabua.pt

Tábua (Portuguese pronunciation: [ˈtaβu.ɐ]), officially the Town of Tábua (Portuguese: Vila de Tábua, is a town and municipality of the Coimbra District, in Portugal. In 2021 it had 11,160 inhabitants, in an area of 199.79 square kilometres (77.14 mi^{2}). The town of Tábua is contained within a civil parish with 3,681 inhabitants as of 2021.

== Toponymy ==
Several theories exist about the toponym "Tábua". The traditional belief is that the name Tábua originated from a wooden plank bridge over the Mondego River during the formation of the County of Portugal. However, other locations across Portugal named after wooden bridges typically led to "Ponte de...", "Pontão" or "Barca", rather than "Tábua".

A more recent hypothesis is that the toponym Tábua derives from the Vulgar Latin word "tabula," meaning "board" or "plank," potentially referring to a flat region. This theory is supported by the geographical context, as the municipality is located within the Planalto Beirão (Beira Plateau).

Another hypothesis suggests that the name Tábua originates from the Roman god Tabudico. An inscription dedicated to Tabudico is found on a votive altar currently housed at the Institute of Archaeology of the Faculty of Arts of the University of Coimbra, which reads: "TABUDICO / C. FABIVS. VIATOR / L. A. D. D."

Lastly, "tabua" is also the common name for Typha angustifolia, an aquatic or semi-terrestrial herbaceous plant with a rhizome that thrives in wetlands, lagoons, and waterways. This plant is known for invading shallow waters and causing rapid obstructions, and it is abundant along the banks of the Mondego River, which could also be a plausible origin for the toponym Tábua.

== History ==
Archaeological evidence suggests that the region of Tábua has been inhabited since at least the Roman times, with findings including ceramic artifacts, inscriptions and remnants of bridges and roads.

Prior to the 12th century, limited information exists about the area of Tábua municipality, with only the parish of Midões being sparingly mentioned. However, it is believed that the territory was under the dominion of the civitas senense and later the castle of Seia. Consequently, the early parishes of the municipality were administratively included in the medieval territory (Terra) or jurisdiction (Julgado) of Seia.

In the 12th century, Tábua was granted as an honra (noble domain) to the "da Cunha" family in the Inquirições (inquiries) by Theresa of Portugal, daughter of King Afonso I. The domain remained under this family's control for seven centuries, ending with José Maria Vasques Álvares da Cunha, 4th Count of Cunha, who died on March 16, 1865. King Afonso IV granted the "da Cunha" family civil and criminal jurisdiction over Tábua through a charter dated December 30, 1342, a privilege later confirmed by King John I on May 3, 1392.

On 26 April 1514, Tábua received a foral (charter) from King Manuel I, during a period when the territory was reorganized to centralize royal power. At the time, Tábua referred to a small territory rather than a singular settlement, encompassing the neighborhoods such as Alvarelhos, Fundo de Vila, and Silhada. Other localities that are a part of the modern municipality of Tábua received their own forals during the 16th century: Ázere, Sinde, Covas, Vila Nova de Oliveirinha, Candosa, Midões, Mouronho and Pinheiro de Côja.

In the 19th century, the municipality of Tábua absorbed several smaller municipalities, including Candosa (dissolved in 1840 and incorporated into Midões), Midões (dissolved in 1853, partly due to the crimes attributed to the notorious João Brandão), as well as Ázere and Sinde. The territory would be reorganized in 2013, when some civil parishes were merged lowering the number of parishes from 15 to 11.

== Parishes ==
Administratively, the municipality is divided into 11 civil parishes (freguesias):

- Ázere e Covelo
- Candosa
- Carapinha
- Covas e Vila Nova de Oliveirinha
- Espariz e Sinde
- Midões
- Mouronho
- Pinheiro de Coja e Meda de Mouros
- Póvoa de Midões
- São João da Boa Vista
- Tábua

== Notable people ==
- Sara Beirão (1880 – 1974) a writer, journalist, women's rights activist and philanthropist.
- Arlindo Cunha (born 1950) an economist and politician who served as secretary of state and Minister of Agriculture.
- André Fontes (born 1985) a footballer with over 330 club caps.
- António Castanheira Neves (born 1929) a Portuguese legal philosopher and academic.
- Ricardo Neves (born 1989) a footballer who plays as a goalkeeper.
- Nuno Rodrigues (born 1994) a footballer who plays as a midfielder.
