= Palácio de Midões =

Palace in the village of Midões, Portugal

Coordinates: 40°23′06″N 7°57′03″W

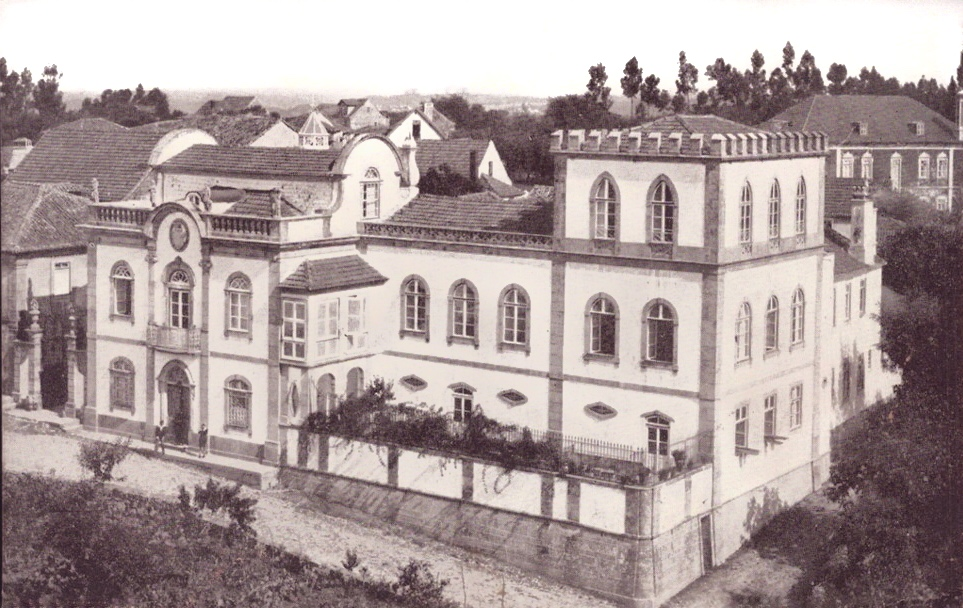
Palácio de Midões, c. 19th century (also known as Palácio das Quatro Estações)

Palácio de Midões is a palace located in the village of Midões, Tabua, Portugal. It was built in the nineteenth century by Dr. César Ribeiro de Abranches Castelo-Branco (the 2nd Viscount of Midões), the son of Roque Ribeiro de Abranches Castelo-Branco (the 1st Viscount of Midões), the latter of whom commissioned the neighbouring property known as Solar do Ribeirinho.

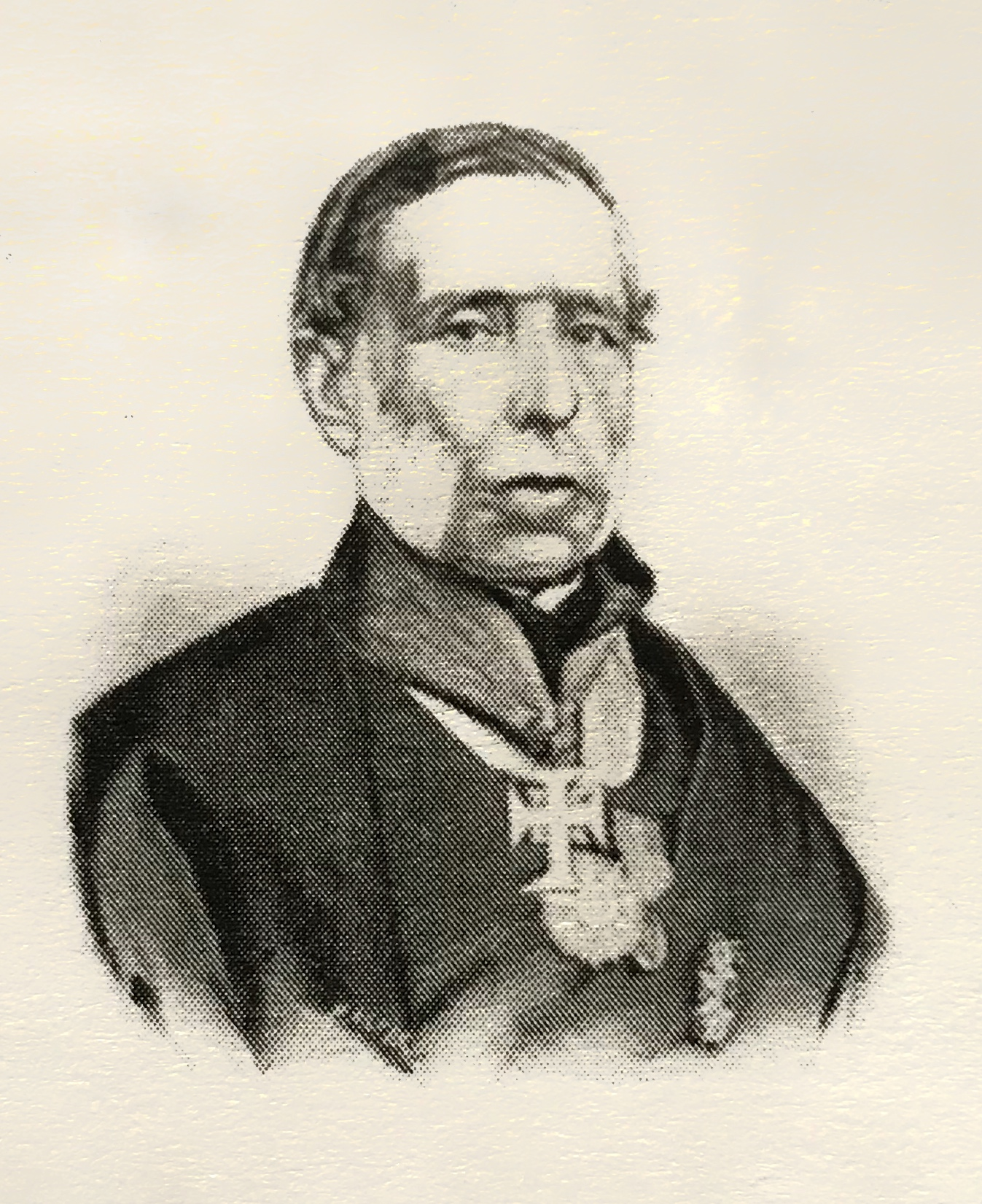
Dr. César Ribeiro de Abranches Castelo-Branco, the 2nd Visount of Midões (02-10-1803 - 05-03-1889)

The Palace is also known as the Palace of Four Seasons (or in Portuguese, 'Palácio das Quatro Estações'), represented by the four allegorical sculptures located above the main entrance, each one representing a season: spring, summer, autumn, and winter.

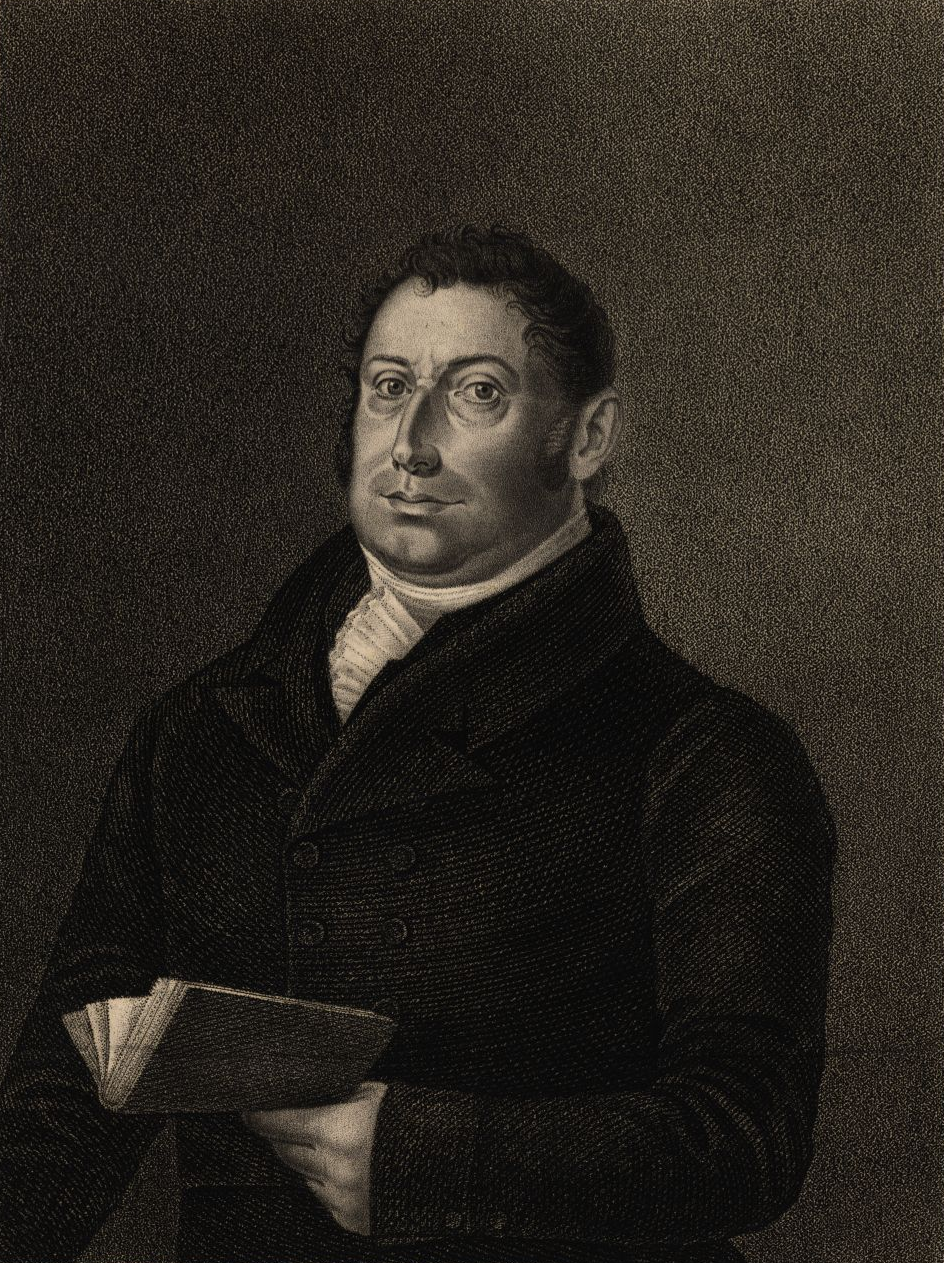
Roque Ribeiro de Abranches Castelo Branco, 1.º Visconde de Midões

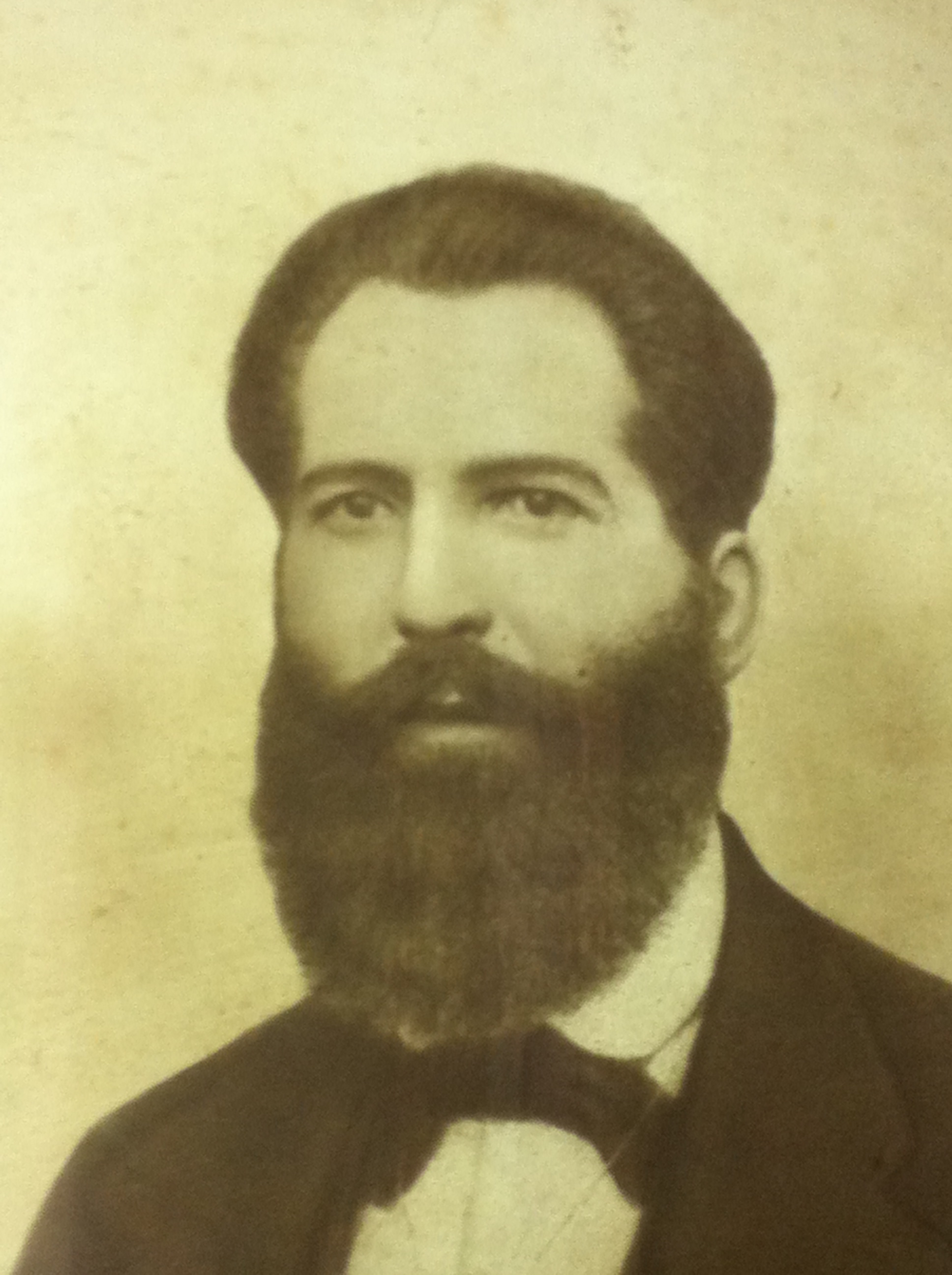
João Vítor da Silva Brandão (01.03.1825 — 1880)

The Palace is a key historical landmark. It housed the noble Ribeiro de Branches Castelo-Branco family, who not only held key political positions in their own right, but also had close ties to the crown and important historical figures such as João Brandão, who was elected councillor and fiscal of the county of Midões in 1853.
