= Casa da Obra =

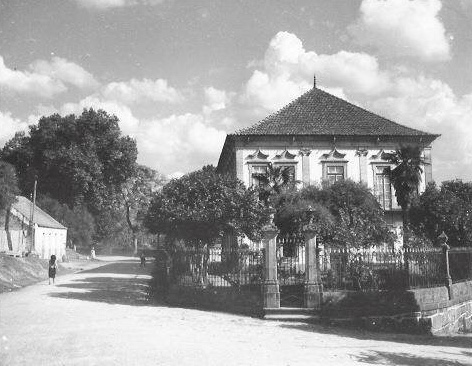
Casa da Obra (also known as ‘Valverde’) Circa 1907

Casa da Obra (also known as ‘Valverde’) is a Manor House located in the Portuguese village of Midões, Tabua (Coimbra, Portugal). It was constructed around 1907 (as evidenced by the engraved date on the house's exterior façade). It is one of the many manor houses that were built in this area during the period when Midões thrived as one of the central powers and seat of Coimbra (later transferred to the neighbouring Parish of Tabua when the council was dissolved).
