= Midões (Tábua) =

- Civil parish
- Location in Portugal
- Coordinates: 40.386°N 7.950°W
- Country: Portugal
- Region: Centro
- Intermunic. comm.: Região de Coimbra
- District: Coimbra
- Municipality: Tábua

Area
  - Total: 20.07 km^{2} (7.75 sq mi)

Population (2011)
  - Total: 1,725
  - Density: 86/km^{2} (220/sq mi)
- Time zone: UTC+00:00 (WET)
  - Summer (DST): UTC+01:00 (WEST)

Midões (Portuguese pronunciation: [miˈðõjʃ]) is a historic Portuguese village and civil parish in Tábua municipality, in the District of Coimbra. It covers an area of approximately 19.98 km ² and was recorded as having a population of 1,725, in 2011 with a population density of 86.3 inhabitants/km^{2}.

It is situated close to a number of rivers, including Cavalos river, the Sea river and the Mondego river.

== History ==
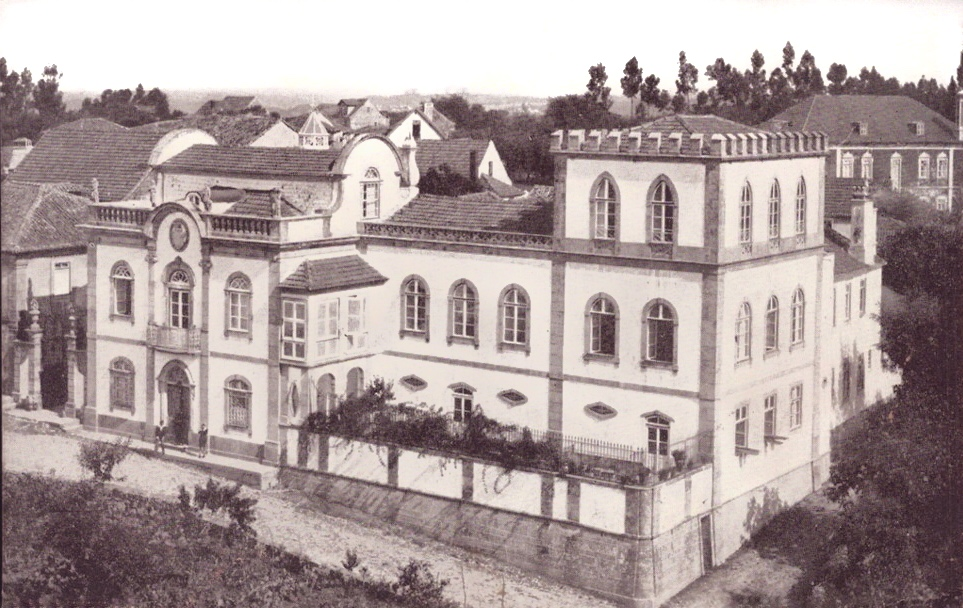
Palácio de Midões, circa 19th century (also known as Palácio das Quatro Estações) commissioned by the 2nd Viscount of Midões, Dr. César Ribeiro de Abranches Castelo-Branco.

Midões played a pivotal historical role and backdrop for the legendary tales of João Brandão and the civil struggles of the Beira area at the time. The village was also home to a number of important and stately figures, including the Viscount of Vinhal, Roque Ribeiro de Abranches Castelo-Branco (the Viscount of Midões) and later his son, Dr. César Ribeiro de Abranches Castelo-Branco (2nd Visount of Midões), the latter who commissioned the iconic Palácio de Midões.

Midões was the stronghold for many years and held the central seat of Coimbra from 1514 until 1853 until the council was disassembled and relocated to the newer neighbouring parish of Tabua.

Additional parishes were also later added in the early nineteenth century which included Candosa, Covasand and Vila Nova de Oliveirinha.

== Heritage ==
Midões is a village full of history dating back to Roman times as evidenced by the many Roman ruins and graves left from early settlers as well as many stately homes that were left behind by the noble families that lived there when the central seat of Coimbra was moved to Tabua. A number of these manor houses, the town palace and historical landmarks can still be seen in Midões today and include:

- Palácio de Midões (also known as 'Palácio das Quatro Estações')
- Solar do Ribeirinho
- The House of João Brandão (in Casal da Senhora)
- The Roman Viaduct of Midoes
- Casa do Esporão
- Solar dos Sousa Machado
- Casa da Obra (also known as 'Valverde')
- Pelourinho de Midões (an IGESPAR classified historical landmark of public interest)
- Pelourinho de Coitus

Midões is also home to a number of historic churches, including:

- Matriz de Midões, dedicated to our Lady of the Snows
- Chapel of Our Lady of Sorrows
- Outeiro de S. Miguel
- Chapel of St. Sebastian (with Roman tombstones) in Coitus

== Sports ==
The regional club G.D. Tourizense is based in the village of Touriz, within the Midões civil parish.

== Bibliography ==
- DUARTE, Marco Daniel, Board: history, art and memory, Board, Tábua Town Hall, 2009
- FERREIRA, Luís Pedro, Tábua: a past with a future, Tábua, Câmara Municipal de Tábua, 2007
- SARAIVA, José da Costa, Monografía de Midões, Cucujães, Author Edition, 1986
- VEIGA, António Duarte de Almeida, Midões and his old Municipality, Lisbon, Livraria Editora, 1911
