= List of international presidential trips made by Marcelo Rebelo de Sousa =

This is a list of international presidential trips made by Marcelo Rebelo de Sousa, the former President of Portugal.

== First term (2016–2021) ==
=== 2016 ===
Country	Locations	Date	Details
Vatican City		17 March	Visit to the Vatican City to meet Pope Francis and Cardinal Secretary of State Pietro Parolin and then to Spain to meet King Felipe VI.
Spain	Madrid	17 March	Visit to the Vatican City to meet Pope Francis and Cardinal Secretary of State Pietro Parolin and then to Spain to meet King Felipe VI.
Mozambique	Maputo	3–6 May	Four-day state visit.
Morocco	Casablanca	28 June	About eight-hour visit to meet King Mohammed VI.
Brazil	Rio de Janeiro, São Paulo, Recife	3–8 August	Attended the opening ceremony of the 2016 Summer Olympics.
Switzerland	Geneva, Bern	17–18 October	
Cuba	Havana	26–27 October	26 October: Visit to Old Havana; opening of a Portuguese-language library named after Eça de Queirós; closing speech at the Portugal–Cuba Business Forum; meeting with Fidel Castro; meeting and dinner with Raúl Castro. 27 October: Visit to the Cohiba cigar factory; conference on "Portugal and Latin America" at the University of Havana; reception of the Portuguese Cuban community at the Portuguese embassy; visit to the "Cuban Art Factory".
United Kingdom	London	16–17 November	16 November: Meetings with City businessmen, bankers, and investors. Lunch offered by recently elected Lord Mayor Andrew Parmley. Meeting with Prime Minister Theresa May at 10 Downing Street. Event with members of the local Anglo-Portuguese community at the Portuguese embassy. 17 November: Visit to artist Paula Rego's workshop. Reception hosted by Queen Elizabeth II.

=== 2018 ===
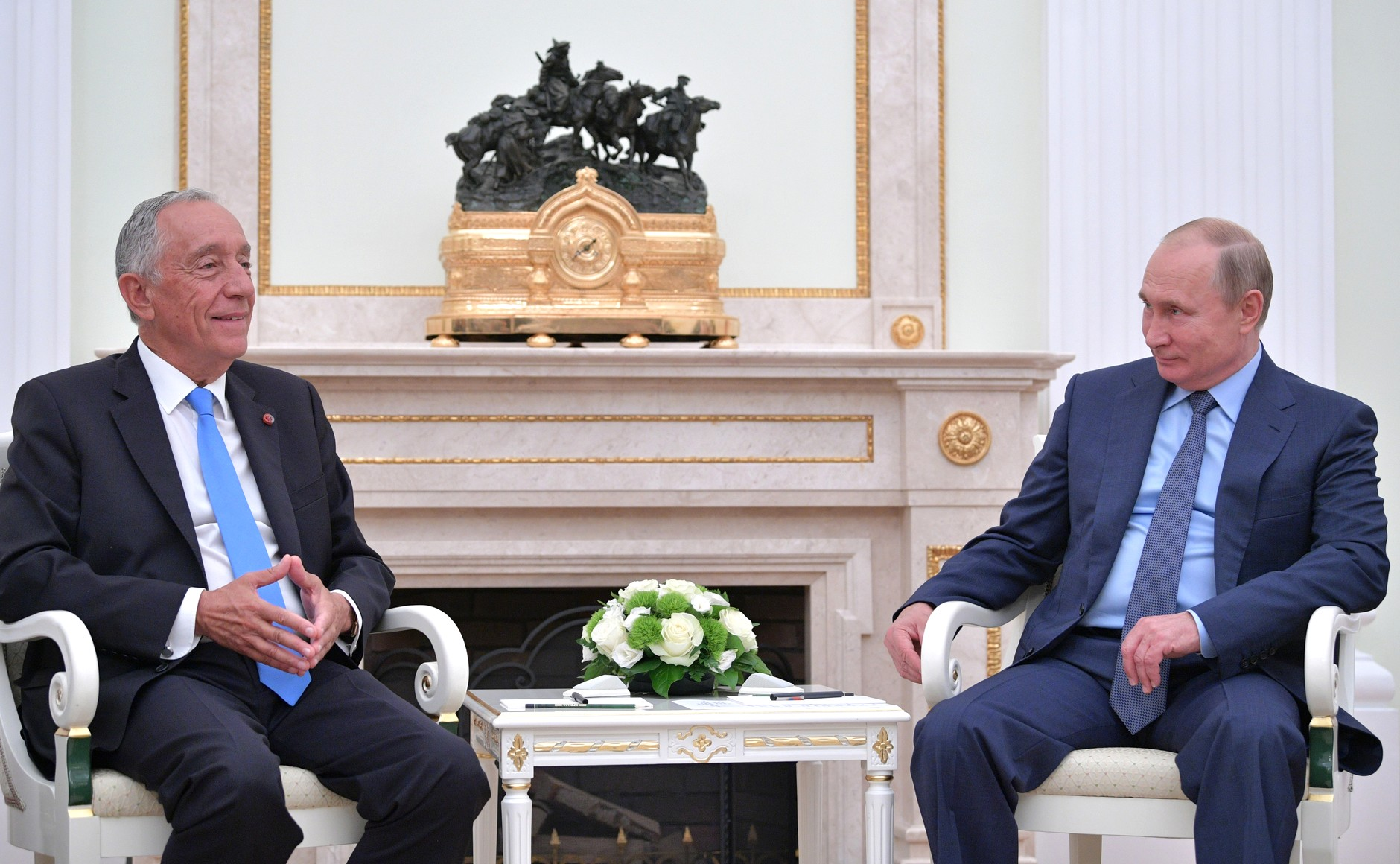
Rebelo de Sousa with Vladimir Putin in the Kremlin, June 2018.

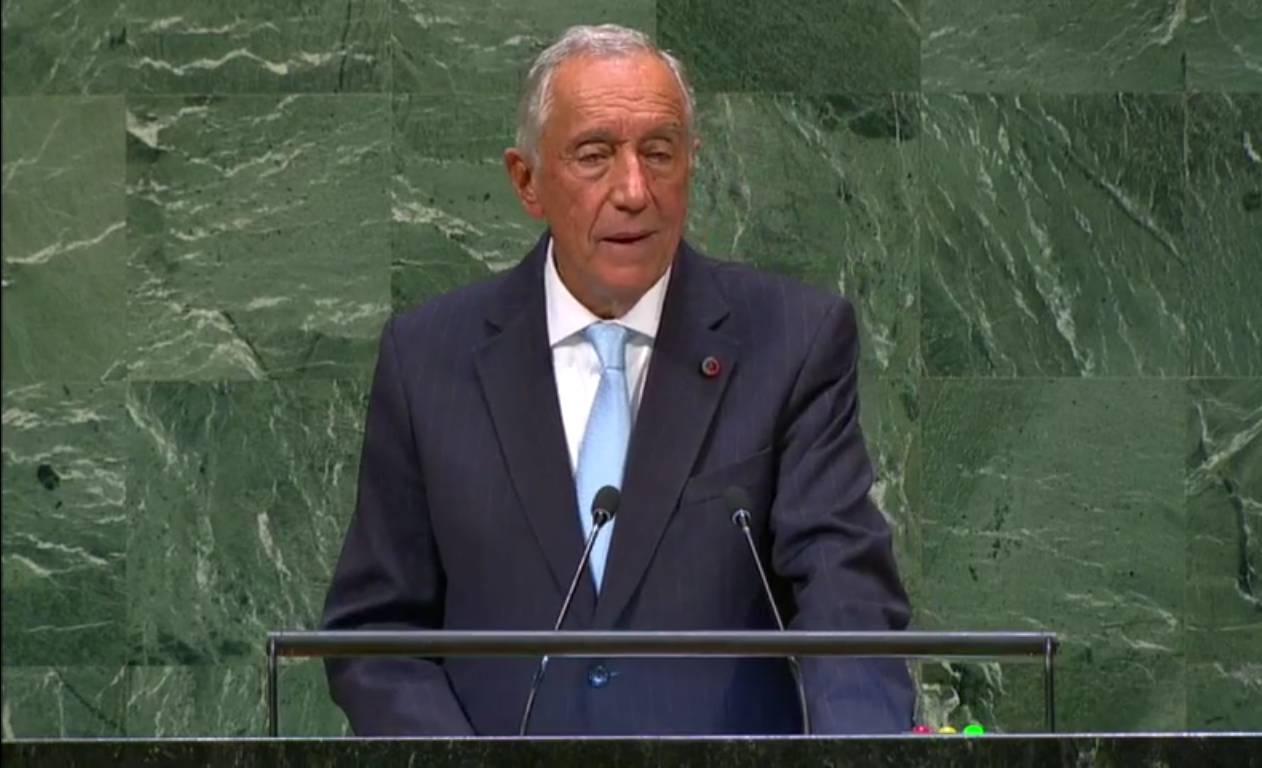
Rebelo de Sousa at the United Nations in 2018

Country	Locations	Date	Details
São Tomé and Príncipe	São Tomé, Fernão Dias, Neves, Santo António	20–22 February	
Greece	Athens, Thebes	12–14 March	Visit to Greece to meet Prime Minister Alexis Tsipras and the President of the Hellenic Parliament Nikos Voutsis, with a dinner hosted by President Prokopis Pavlopoulos. He received an Honorary Degree from the University of Athens and visited the International Organization for Migration's refugee camp in Thebes.
Spain	Madrid	16–18 April	State visit to Spain on the invitation of King Felipe VI
United States	Washington, D.C.	26–27 June	Official meeting with President Donald Trump.

=== 2020 ===
Country	Locations	Date	Details
India	New Delhi, Mumbai, Panaji	13–16 February	Visited India on a state visit between 13 and 16 February 2020. During his visit, he was accorded a ceremonial welcome at Rashtrapati Bhavan on 14 February, following which he hold delegation level talks with Prime Minister Narendra Modi. The President Ram Nath Kovind hosted his banquet in his honour. He also visited Mumbai and Goa as a part of his state visit to India.

== Second term (2021–2026) ==
=== 2021 ===
Country	Locations	Date	Details
Vatican City		12 March	Visit to the Vatican City to meet Pope Francis and Cardinal Secretary of State Pietro Parolin and then to Spain to meet King Felipe VI.
Spain	Madrid	12 March	Visit to the Vatican City to meet Pope Francis and Cardinal Secretary of State Pietro Parolin and then to Spain to meet King Felipe VI.
Slovenia	Ljubljana	May 31 - June 1	At the invitation of the President of the Republic of Slovenia, Borut Pahor, the President of Portugal paid an official visit to Slovenia. This marked Portugal handing over the six-month rotating presidency of the Council of the European Union to Slovenia.

=== 2022 ===
Country	Locations	Date	Details
United Kingdom	London	September 17–19	Paid respects at the Queen's lying in state, met with the new King Charles III at a reception at Buckingham Palace and attended the state funeral of Queen Elizabeth II at Westminster Abbey.
Republic of Ireland	Dublin	October 18–20	The President undertook a State Visit to the Republic of Ireland

=== 2023 ===
Country	Locations	Date	Details
United Kingdom	London	May 5–6	Attended a pre coronation reception and the Coronation of Charles III and Queen Camilla
South Africa	Pretoria	June 6–10	State Visit

=== 2024 ===
Country	Locations	Date	Details
Republic of Ireland	Dublin	September 4	The President of Portugal met Michael Higgins and his wife for a meeting and lunch.
Kingdom of the Netherlands	Amsterdam; The Hague	December 10–11	The President of Portugal, paid a state visit to the Netherlands on Tuesday 10 and Wednesday 11 December.

=== 2025 ===
Country	Locations	Date	Details
Czech Republic	Prague	March 5	The President of Portugal, undertook an official visit to Czech Republic.
Slovenia	Ljubljana	March 17–19	The President of Portugal, undertook a three-day official visit to Slovenia, at the invitation of his Slovenian counterpart, Nataša Pirc Musar.
Vatican City		26 April	Visit to the Vatican City to attend the funeral of Pope Francis

=== 2026 ===
Country	Locations	Date	Details
Vatican	Vatican City	February 2	The President of Portugal, undertook an official visit to the Vatican, where he personally met with Pope Leo XIV.
Spain	Madrid	February 20~21	The President of Portugal, paid a 2-day official visit to Spain, at the invitation of the King of Spain Felipe VI.

== See also ==
- List of international presidential trips made by Aníbal Cavaco Silva
- List of international presidential trips made by António José de Almeida
- List of international presidential trips made by António José Seguro
- List of international presidential trips made by Bernardino Machado
- List of international presidential trips made by Francisco Craveiro Lopes
- List of international presidential trips made by Mário Soares
