= List of international presidential trips made by Mário Soares =

Below is a list of international presidential trips made by Mário Soares as President of the Portuguese Republic.

== First term (1986-1991) ==
=== 1986 ===
Country	Locations	Date	Details
São Tomé and Príncipe	São Tomé, Príncipe	5-8 December	
Cape Verde	Praia, Tarrafal	8-11 December	

=== 1987 ===
Country	Locations	Date	Details
Brazil	São Paulo	28 March–April 5	Received a honoris causa by the São Paulo State University (UNESP).
Soviet Union	Moscow, Yerevan, Baku	22-29 November	Meeting with the General Secretary of the Central Committee of the Communist Party of the Soviet Union, Mikhail Gorbachev and with activist Andrei Sakharov.
Spain	Madrid, Salamanca, Barcelona, Seville	14-19 December	

=== 1988 ===
Country	Locations	Date	Details
West Germany		18-23 April	
Luxembourg		16-18 May	
Switzerland		18-21 May	
Greece		12-17 December	

=== 1989 ===
Country	Locations	Date	Details
British Hong Kong and Macau		27 February-5 March	
Italy		5-12 April	
Hungarian People's Republic		27 September-2 October	
Netherlands		2-4 October	
France	Paris, Lyon, Bordeaux	16-21 October	Meeting with the President of the French Republic, François Mitterrand.
Guinea-Bissau		20-24 November	
Côte d'Ivoire		24-26 November	
Zaire		26-30 November	

=== 1990 ===
Country	Locations	Date	Details
Sovereign Military Order of Malta		19-20 February	
Vatican City		26-29 April	
Morocco		15-20 May	
Sweden		9-11 October	

== Second term (1991-1996) ==
=== 1992 ===
Country	Locations	Date	Details
Oman	Muscat	23-24 January	Meeting with the Sultan of Oman, Qaboos Bin Said.
India	(New Delhi, Jaipur, Kochi, Mumbai, Pangim, Pondá, Daman, Diu)	24 January-2 February	Meeting with the President of India, Ramaswamy Venkataraman during the Indian Republic Day (26 January).
Denmark		6-9 May	
Turkey		21-27 October	

=== 1993 ===
Country	Locations	Date	Details
United Kingdom		27 April-2 May	
Ireland		1-4 June	
Iceland		4-6 June	
Chile		9-14 July	
Japan		18-27 October	
British Hong Kong and Macau		28-31 October	

=== 1994 ===
Country	Locations	Date	Details
Bulgaria		13-16 September	
Malta		9-11 October	
Egypt		11-16 October	
Latvia		17-18 October	
Poland		18-20 October	
Czech Republic		16-17 November	

=== 1995 ===
Country	Locations	Date	Details
Tunisia		7-8 March	
Macau		6-10 April	
People's Republic of China	Beijing, Xi'an, Shanghai	10-17 April	
Pakistan		17-19 April	
Israel	Jerusalem	31 October-4 November	Attended the Knesset, visited the Museum of the Holocaust; attended the funeral of Yitzhak Rabin.
Palestinian Authority	Gaza	4-5 November	Meeting with the President of the Palestinian Authority, Yasser Arafat; he was in Gaza when the Israeli Prime Minister, Yitzhak Rabin, was assassinated.
South Africa		17-24 November	
Seychelles		4-5 december	Meeting with President France Albert René.

=== 1996 ===
Country	Locations	Date	Details
Angola		8-11 January	
São Tomé and Príncipe		11 January	

== Sources ==
- Fundação Mário Soares (in portuguese)

== See also ==
- List of international presidential trips made by Aníbal Cavaco Silva
- List of international presidential trips made by António José de Almeida
- List of international presidential trips made by António José Seguro
- List of international presidential trips made by Bernardino Machado
- List of international presidential trips made by Francisco Craveiro Lopes
- List of international presidential trips made by Marcelo Rebelo de Sousa
