= André Fontes =

Portuguese footballer (born 1985)

Personal information
- Full name: André Filipe Pereira Fontes
- Date of birth: 27 May 1985 (age 41)
- Place of birth: Tábua, Portugal
- Height: 1.79 m (5 ft 10 1/2 in)
- Position: Midfielder

Youth career
- 1999−2003: Oliveira Hospital

Senior career*
Years	Team	Apps	(Gls)
2003–2005	Oliveira Hospital	21	(2)
2005–2009	Tourizense	93	(6)
2009–2010	Académica	5	(0)
2010–2012	Feirense	36	(4)
2012–2013	Naval	39	(1)
2013–2015	Penafiel	69	(5)
2015–2016	Moreirense	6	(1)
2016	Chaves	1	(0)
2016–2017	Penafiel	39	(2)
2017–2018	Gil Vicente	21	(1)
2018–2019	União Leiria	6	(0)
2019	Louletano	11	(0)
2019–2020	Berço	18	(2)
2020–2023	Oliveira Hospital	54	(4)
Total		419	(28)
- * Club domestic league appearances and goals

André Filipe Pereira Fontes (born 27 May 1985 in Tábua, Coimbra District) is a Portuguese former professional footballer who played as a midfielder.
