= Ricardo Neves =

Portuguese footballer

Personal information
- Full name: Ricardo Manuel Fonseca Neves
- Date of birth: 7 January 1989 (age 37)
- Place of birth: Tábua, Portugal
- Height: 1.87 m (6 ft 2 in)
- Position: Goalkeeper

Team information
- Current team: Gondomar

Youth career
- 1998–1999: Tourizense
- 1999–2000: Tabuense
- 2000–2003: Tourizense
- 2003–2008: Boavista
- 2004–2005: → Pasteleira (loan)

Senior career*
Years	Team	Apps	(Gls)
2008	Boavista	0	(0)
2008–2009	Ourense B		
2009–2011	Marítimo	0	(0)
2010–2011	→ Varzim (loan)	24	(0)
2011–2013	Naval	12	(0)
2013–2016	Farense	31	(0)
2016–2017	União Leiria	18	(0)
2018	Cinfães	7	(0)
2018–2019	Águeda	13	(0)
2019–	Gondomar	144	(0)

International career
2005	Portugal U16	7	(0)
2005–2006	Portugal U17	12	(0)
2006–2007	Portugal U18	6	(0)
2007–2008	Portugal U19	6	(0)
- * Club domestic league appearances and goals as of 22:05, 17 May 2025 (UTC)

Ricardo Manuel Fonseca Neves (born 7 January 1989 in Tábua, Coimbra District) is a Portuguese professional footballer who plays for Gondomar S.C. as a goalkeeper.
