= Monarchist Cause =

Portuguese political party (1914–1926)

Monarchist Cause Causa Monárquica
- Abbreviation: CM
- Founded: 1914
- Ideology: Monarchism
- Political position: Right-Wing
- Colors: Blue and white

Monarchist Cause (Portuguese: Causa Monárquica, CM) was a political party in Portugal that supported to restoration of King Manuel II during the First Portuguese Republic.

== History ==
The party was established in 1914. It emerged as the second-largest party in the 1918 elections (which were boycotted by the main opposition parties), winning 37 of the 155 seats. It failed to win a seat in the 1919 elections, but won four seats in the House of Representatives in the 1921 elections. The party went on to win 13 seats in the 1922 elections, but was reduced to seven seats in the 1925 elections.
