= List of international presidential trips made by Bernardino Machado =

His Excellency Bernardino Machado GCTE GCL
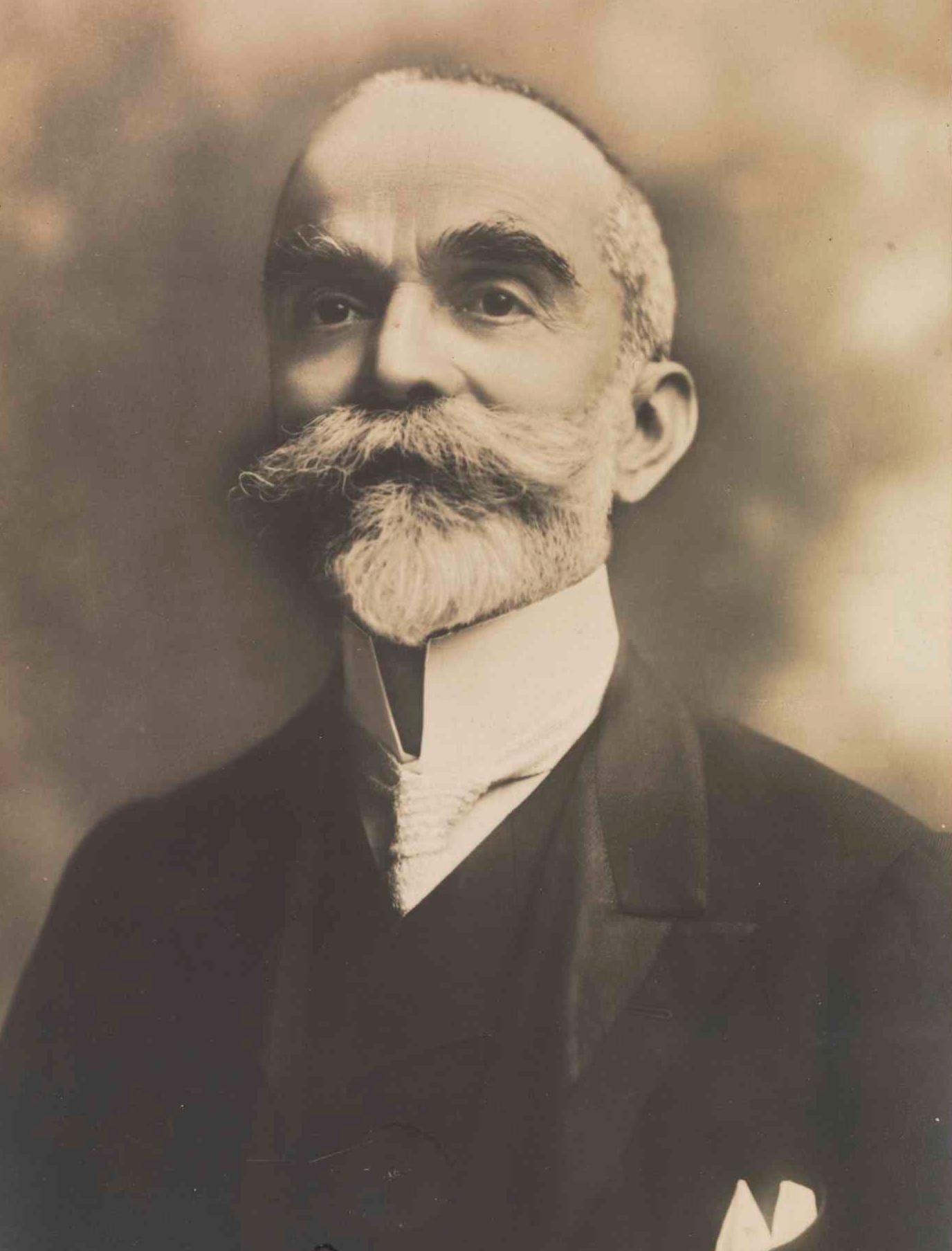

President of the Portuguese Republic
- In office 11 December 1925 – 31 May 1926
- Preceded by: Manuel Teixeira Gomes
- Succeeded by: José Mendes Cabeçadas
- In office 5 October 1915 – 12 December 1917
- Preceded by: Teófilo Braga
- Succeeded by: Sidónio Pais
- Website: bernardinomachado.org

Bernardino Machado was the third and eighth President of the First Portuguese Republic, having served two non-consecutive terms (1915-1917 and 1925–1926, respectively).

He was the first President of the newly established Portuguese Republic to make an international trip. During his (single) journey, that lasted from 8 to 25 October 1917, he travelled through Western Europe by train and visited several places in four countries during the First World War - its neutral neighbour Spain and three of its World War I Allies (Belgium, France and the United Kingdom).

Besides being welcomed by the heads of state of these countries (the Kings Alfonso XIII of Spain, George V of the United Kingdom and Albert I of Belgium, in addition to the French President Raymond Poincaré), Bernardino Machado also paid a visit to the Portuguese soldiers deployed in the Western Front.

Below is the route of the international trip made by Portuguese President.

== First term (1915-1917) ==
=== 1917 ===
Country	Locations	Date	Details
Spain	San Sebastián/Donostia	9 October	The Presidential train departed from Rossio railway station in Lisbon to the Portuguese-Spanish border in Vilar Formoso on 8 October and reached the Spanish-French border in San Sebastián the next day. The President was warmly welcomed by the King Alfonso XIII of Spain and had a lunch with the monarch.
France	Hendaye, Sommeilles-Nettancourt, Verdun, Reims, Avenay, Compiègne, Ferme de Quennevières, Lillers, Saint-Venant, Witternesse, Arras, Roquetoire, Merville, Fauquembergues	9-14 October	The Portuguese President departed San Sebastián on 9 October to Hendaye by car and took the train to his next stop in Northern France. On 10 October, President Machado reached the railway station of Sommeilles-Nettancourt at 8:55 a.m., being received by French President Raimond Poincaré. During the day he visited the city of Verdun as well as the Reims Cathedral; in the evening, he had dinner with the French President in Avenay. On October 11, he went to Compiègne where he met the French commander, General Philippe Pétain, and departed to the front in Ferme de Quennevières. During the afternoon, he visited Lillers and left to the headquarters of the Portuguese Expeditionary Corps (CEP) in Saint-Venant. In the evening, President Machado offered a dinner to his French counterpart in Witternesse. On 12 October, he left to Arras, where he saw the destroyed Arras Cathedral. On 13 October, he visited the CEP headquarters once again and met the commander-in-chief, general Tamagnini de Abreu; he also visited the hospital at Merville, where he greeted every single patient. On 14 October, he visited the hospital at Fauquembergues and the training camp, leaving the Portuguese sector in the Western Front.
Belgium	Messines/Mesen	15 October	The President paid a visit to the battlefield of the Battle of Messines, in Belgium.
France	Tramecourt, Boulogne-sur-Mer, Ambleteuse	15-16 October	After the visit to Messines, the President returned to France and visited a CEP base at Boulogne-sur-Mer.
United Kingdom	Folkestone, London, Winchester, Horsham	17-21 October	On 17 October, President Machado and his entourage caught the HMS Phoebe destroyer to Folkestone and took the train from there to London, where he was greeted by the British Prime Minister David Lloyd George. They had a dinner at the Ritz Hotel. On 18 October, the Portuguese President was welcomed by King George V in the Buckingham Palace and had a lunch with the monarch; later, he visited the Portuguese Embassy, led by Manuel Teixeira Gomes. On 19 October, he visited some Portuguese soldiers training at Hazeley Down Camp, near Winchester and, on the very next day, he did the same in Horsham.
France	Boulogne-sur-Mer	21 October	The President departed from Folkestone to France and spent the night at the Palais Imperial, in Boulogne-sur-Mer.
Belgium	La Panne/De Panne, Furnes/Veurne	22 October	On October 22, the President departed from Boulogne to Belgium, where he was welcomed and had a lunch with King Albert I at the Château de Sainte-Flore in La Panne, at the time the royal residence during the occupation of the country by the Germans. During the afternoon, the Portuguese president went to Veurne to look at the destruction of the city.
France	Boulogne-sur-Mer, Paris, Hendaye	22-24 October	During the evening of 22 October, the President left Boulogne-sur-Mer and from there he took the train to Paris. On 23 October, at 9:00 a.m., the President arrived in Paris and settled in Hotel Le Meurice. He had an official lunch with President Poincaré at the Élysée Palace and took a special train back to Portugal at 4:00 p.m. On 24 October, at 8:00 a.m., he arrived in Hendaye and visited a hospital.
Spain	Medina del Campo	24-25 October	The President entered Spain on October 24, and during the last part of his trip he received several individualities, including the Spanish writer Miguel de Unamuno, with whom he had dinner in Medina del Campo. On October 25, at 3:45 a.m., the train crossed the Portuguese border, arriving in Lisbon at 1:20 p.m.

== See also ==
- List of international presidential trips made by Aníbal Cavaco Silva
- List of international presidential trips made by António José de Almeida
- List of international presidential trips made by Francisco Craveiro Lopes
- List of international presidential trips made by Marcelo Rebelo de Sousa
- List of international presidential trips made by Mário Soares
