= List of international presidential trips made by António José de Almeida =

His Excellency António José de Almeida GCTE GCA GCC GCSE

President of the Portuguese Republic
- In office 5 October 1919 – 5 October 1923
- Preceded by: João do Canto e Castro
- Succeeded by: Manuel Teixeira Gomes

António José de Almeida was the 6th President of the Portuguese Republic, being the only president of the First Republic to complete his presidential term (1919-1923).

During his term he performed one official visit to the United States of Brazil, which celebrated the centenary of its independence in 1922.

== 1922 ==
Country	Locations	Date	Details
Brazil	Rio de Janeiro (Federal District of Brasil), Salvador da Bahia	17-27 September 1922	The President visited the United States of Brasil on invitation of President Epitácio Pessoa

== See also ==
- List of international presidential trips made by Aníbal Cavaco Silva
- List of international presidential trips made by Bernardino Machado
- List of international presidential trips made by Francisco Craveiro Lopes
- List of international presidential trips made by Marcelo Rebelo de Sousa
- List of international presidential trips made by Mário Soares
