= List of international presidential trips made by Aníbal Cavaco Silva =

Below is a list of international presidential trips made by Aníbal Cavaco Silva as President of the Portuguese Republic.

== First term (2006–2011) ==
=== 2006 ===
Country	Locations	Date	Details
Guinea-Bissau	Bissau	July	6th CPLP Summit.
Spain	Madrid	25-28 September	Visit to his Spanish counterpart King Juan Carlos I and his wife, Queen Sofía.
Uruguay	Montevideo	November	16th Ibero-American Summit.

=== 2007 ===
Country	Locations	Date	Details
India		10-28 January	Visit to Indian Prime Minister Manmohan Singh.
Luxembourg		9 March	
Latvia	Riga	April	4th Arraiolos meeting
United States		20-23 June	During this visit, President Cavaco Silva plans to open an exhibition concerning Portugal's role in the discovery and convergence of diverse cultures, and to contact some Portuguese communities on the North American Eastern Seaboard, including the city of Fall River, Massachusetts whose Portuguese-descended population (43.9 percent at the 2000 census) is the highest of any municipality in the United States. Fall River features a replica of "The Gates of the City of Ponta Delgada" or "Portas da Cidade" in Portuguese.
France Belgium	European institutions in Strasbourg and Brussels	3-5 September	
Chile	Santiago	6-10 November	Meeting with President Michelle Bachelet. 17th Ibero-American Summit.

=== 2008 ===
Country	Locations	Date	Details
Spain	León	10-11 February	
Jordan		16-18 February	Meeting with King Abdullah II and Queen Rania.
Brazil	Rio de Janeiro	6-9 March	Visit to his Brazilian counterpart President Lula da Silva.
Mozambique		24-26 March	Meeting with President Armando Guebuza.
Austria	Graz	April	5th Arraiolos meeting
Italy	Naples	June	4th COTEC Europa meeting
Poland		1-4 September	Meeting with Polish President Lech Kaczyński.
Slovakia		4-5 September	Visit to President Ivan Gašparovič.
USA	New York City	22-25 September	

=== 2009 ===
Country	Locations	Date	Details
Germany	Osnabrück	2-6 March	Visit to his German counterpart President Horst Köhler.
Turkey		11-15 May	Meeting with Turkish Prime Minister Recep Erdoğan and President Abdullah Gül.
Italy	Naples	June	6th Arraiolos meeting
Austria		23-26 July	Meeting with the former Austrian Chancellor Franz Vranitzky and President Heinz Fischer.
Spain	Madrid	October	5th COTEC Europa meeting

=== 2010 ===
Country	Locations	Date	Details
Spain	Barcelona		
Andorra		5-7 March	
Czech Republic		14-17 April	Meeting with President Václav Klaus. The trip had to be extended due to the air traffic disruptions because of the eruption(s) of Eyjafjallajökull.
Cape Verde		4-7 July	Meeting with his counterpart of Cape Verde, President Pedro Pires. Cavaco Silva also met with the Prime Minister of Cape Verde.
Angola		18-23 July	Silva made a strong effort to speak to business owners and to strengthen relations between Portuguese and Angolan businesses. met with the President Eduardo dos Santos along with many of the governors of the different regions of Angola. This trip is expected to be the last state visit that Cavaco Silva will make during his first term of the presidency. 8th CPLP Summit (23 July).
Argentina	Mar del Plata	November	20th Ibero-American Summit.

== Second term (2011–2016) ==
=== 2011 ===
Country	Locations	Date	Details
Hungary	Budapest	April	7th Arraiolos meeting.
Paraguay	Asunción	October	21st Ibero-American Summit.
Italy	Genoa	October	7th COTEC Europa meeting.
USA	New York City, Washington, D.C., San Jose	9-14 November	

=== 2012 ===
Country	Locations	Date	Details
Finland	Helsinki	February	8th Arraiolos meeting.
East Timor		19-22 May	
Indonesia		22-24 May	
Australia		24-26 May	
Singapore		27-28 May	
Mozambique	Maputo	July	9th CPLP Summit.
Spain	Madrid	October	
Spain	Cádiz	November	22nd Ibero-American Summit.

=== 2013 ===
Country	Locations	Date	Details
Colombia		15-17 April	
Peru		18-19 April	
Sweden		1-3 October	Welcomed by the King and Queen of Sweden, Silva visited a series of technological, economic and cultural enterprises.
Poland	Kraków	October	9th Arraiolos meeting.
Panama	Panama City	16-18 October	23rd Ibero-American Summit.

=== 2014 ===
Country	Locations	Date	Details
China		13-18 May	
Korea		19-21 July	
East Timor	Dili	July	10th CPLP Summit.
UAE		26-27 November	
Mexico	Veracruz	8-9 December	24th Ibero-American Summit.

=== 2015 ===
Country	Locations	Date	Details
Norway		4-6 May	
Bulgaria		15-16 June	
Romania		17-18 June	
Germany	Wartburg, Erfurt	September	11th Arraiolos meeting
Italy	Rome	October	

== See also ==
- List of international presidential trips made by António José de Almeida
- List of international presidential trips made by Bernardino Machado
- List of international presidential trips made by Francisco Craveiro Lopes
- List of international presidential trips made by Mário Soares
- List of international presidential trips made by Marcelo Rebelo de Sousa
