= List of international presidential trips made by Francisco Craveiro Lopes =

His Excellency Francisco Craveiro Lopes GCTE ComC GCA GCB

President of the Portuguese Republic
- In office 9 August 1951 – 9 August 1958
- Preceded by: Óscar Carmona
- Succeeded by: Américo Tomás

Francisco Craveiro Lopes was the 12th President of the Portuguese Republic (the second of the Estado Novo), having served one-full term from 1951 to 1958.

During his term he performed several visits to the then Portuguese overseas colonies in Africa, as well as to some foreign countries.

Below is a list of the international trips made by President Francisco Craveiro Lopes (excluding the Portuguese colonies at the time).

== 1953 ==
Country	Locations	Date	Details
Spain	Madrid, San Lorenzo de El Escorial, Toledo	14-20 May	The Presidential train departed from Santa Apolónia railway station in Lisbon on 14 May, and reached the Madrid Atocha railway station on the next day. The President was welcomed by the Spanish head of state, General Francisco Franco, and visited several places in Madrid, as well as El Escorial, the Valley of the Fallen and the Alcázar of Toledo. Craveiro Lopes departed from Barajas Airport on 20 May.

== 1955 ==
Country	Locations	Date	Details
United Kingdom	London	20-28 October	Official reception by Queen Elizabeth II on October 24.

== 1956 ==
Country	Locations	Date	Details
Union of South Africa	Pretoria	21 August	The President made a visit to the South African capital of Pretoria as part of a presidential tour by the then Portuguese overseas provinces of Angola and Mozambique.

== 1957 ==
Country	Locations	Date	Details
Brazil	Salvador (5-6), Rio de Janeiro (7-11), Petrópolis (12), Belo Horizonte (13-14), São Paulo (15-16), Santos (17-18), Curitiba (19), Porto Alegre (19), Brasília (20), Manaus (21-22), Belém (23), Recife (24-26)	4-26 June	The President visited the United States of Brasil on invitation of President Juscelino Kubitschek.

== See also ==
- List of international presidential trips made by Aníbal Cavaco Silva
- List of international presidential trips made by António José de Almeida
- List of international presidential trips made by Bernardino Machado
- List of international presidential trips made by Marcelo Rebelo de Sousa
- List of international presidential trips made by Mário Soares
