= Reconstitution Party =

The Republican Party of National Reconstitution (Portuguese: Partido Republicano da Reconstituição Nacional, PRRN), commonly known as the Reconstitution Party, was a political party in Portugal

== History ==
The PRRN was established in 1920 as a right-wing breakaway from the Democratic Party. The new party emerged as the third-largest in the 1921 elections, winning 12 of the 163 seats in the House of Representatives and 7 of the 71 seats in the Senate. The 1922 elections saw the party win 17 House seats and 10 Senate seats.

In 1923 the PRRN merged with the Republican Liberal Party and the National Republican Party to form the Nationalist Republican Party.
