= Tomé de Barros Queirós =

Portuguese politician

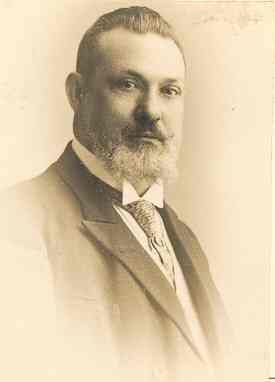

Prime Minister of Portugal
- In office 24 May 1921 – 30 August 1921
- President: António José de Almeida
- Preceded by: Bernardino Machado
- Succeeded by: António Granjo

Personal details
- Born: 2 February 1872 Ílhavo, Portugal
- Died: 5 May 1925 (aged 53) Lisbon, Portugal
- Party: Portuguese Republican Party (later Republican Union Party and Nationalist Republican Party)

Tomé José de Barros Queirós (Thomé José de Barros Queiroz in Portuguese; 2 February 1872 in Ílhavo – 5 May 1925 in Lisbon) was a Portuguese trader, capitalist and politician of the period of the Portuguese First Republic. Among others posts, he served as member of the parliament, Minister of Finances and eventually President of the Ministry (Prime Minister). He was also a member of the Masonry.

A street in the heart of the Baixa district of Lisbon bears his name in celebration of his accomplishments.

Political offices
| Preceded by Bernardino Machado | Prime Minister of Portugal (President of the Ministry); 1921 | Succeeded by António Granjo |
