= Regionalist Party =

Political party in Portugal

The Regionalist Party (Portuguese: Partido Regionalista, PR) was a political party in Portugal.

== History ==
The party was established in 1921 and supported regional autonomy for the Beira region. It won two seats in the 1921 elections, and retained both seats in the 1922 elections.
