= Carlos Maia Pinto =

Portuguese military officer and republican politician

Colonel Carlos Maia Pinto
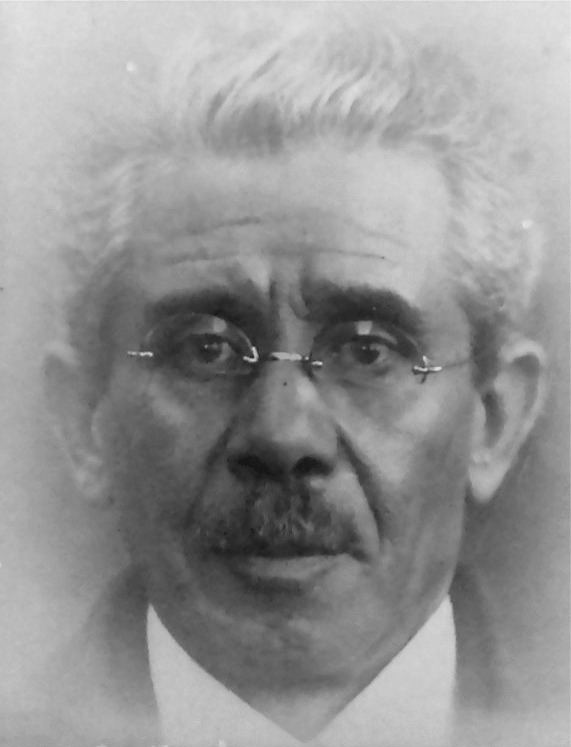

Prime Minister of Portugal
- In office 5 November 1921 – 16 December 1921
- President: António José de Almeida
- Preceded by: Manuel Maria Coelho
- Succeeded by: Francisco da Cunha Leal

Minister of the Colonies of Portugal
- Not sworn it 19 October – 21 October 1921
- President: António José de Almeida
- Prime Minister: Manuel Maria Coelho
- Preceded by: Manuel Ferreira da Rocha
- Succeeded by: José Eduardo de Carvalho Crato (not sworn it)
- In office 22 October – 5 November 1921
- President: António José de Almeida
- Prime Minister: Manuel Maria Coelho
- Preceded by: Manuel Maria Coelho (as interim)
- Succeeded by: Tomás Wylie Fernandes

Minister of the Interior of Portugal
- In office 5 November – 16 December 1921
- President: António José de Almeida
- Prime Minister: Himself
- Preceded by: Manuel Maria Coelho
- Succeeded by: Francisco Cunha Leal

Minister of War of Portugal
- Interim; 5 November – 14 November 1921
- President: António José de Almeida
- Preceded by: José Cortês dos Santos
- Succeeded by: João Pinto de Magalhães

Personal details
- Born: 5 June 1866 Porto, Portugal
- Died: 2 November 1932 (aged 66) Porto, Portugal
- Party: Independent
- Spouse: Maria Helena Monteiro Malheiro Dias Maia Pinto
- Children: Manuel Malheiro Dias Maia Pinto
- Parent(s): Henrique Pinto (father); Carolina Amélia da Silva Maia Pinto (mother)

Military service
- Allegiance: Kingdom of Portugal; Portugal
- Branch/service: Portuguese Army
- Years of service: 1886–1925
- Rank: Colonel

Carlos Henriques da Silva Maia Pinto (5 June 1866 in Porto – 2 November 1932), more commonly known as Carlos Maia Pinto, was a Portuguese military officer and republican politician during the Portuguese First Republic who, among other posts, served as President of the Ministry (Prime Minister).

Political offices
Preceded by Manuel Maria Coelho	Prime Minister of Portugal (President of the Ministry); 1921	Succeeded by Francisco Cunha Leal
