= António Granjo =

Portuguese lawyer and politician

António Granjo OA
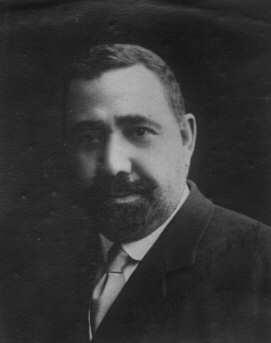

Prime Minister of Portugal
- In office 30 August 1921 – 19 October 1921
- President: António José de Almeida
- Preceded by: Tomé de Barros Queirós
- Succeeded by: Manuel Maria Coelho
- In office 19 July 1920 – 20 November 1920
- President: António José de Almeida
- Preceded by: António Maria da Silva
- Succeeded by: Álvaro de Castro

Personal details
- Born: 27 December 1881 Chaves, Portugal
- Died: 19 October 1921 (aged 39) Lisbon, Portugal
- Party: Evolutionist Party (later Republican Liberal Party)

António Joaquim Granjo OA (European Portuguese pronunciation: [ɐ̃ˈtɔni.u ˈɣɾɐ̃ʒu, ɐ̃ˈtɔnju -]; 27 December 1881 – 19 October 1921) was a Portuguese lawyer and politician who served twice as prime minister during 1920 and 1921, until his assassination.

== Biography ==
Granjo was born in Chaves. Already a committed republican from his youth, well before the 1910 overthrow of the monarchy, he became a member of the National Constituent Assembly, elected on 28 May 1911. He gave up his constituency in order to join the army; during Portuguese participation in World War I, he saw combat himself, and upon returning home he wrote a book about his battle experiences.

After President Sidónio Pais was shot dead, Granjo took action against the Monarchy of the North, an attempt to restore a royalist regime in the north of Portugal, in 1919. He was President of the Municipal Chamber of Chaves, from February to July 1919. That same year he was elected to the Chamber of Deputies, by the Evolutionist Party, later being a founder of its successor movement, the Republican Liberal Party. Minister of Justice during Domingos Pereira's coalition government, he served two brief terms as Prime Minister, the first time, from 19 July to 20 November 1920, in a liberal government. Afterwards he was nominated Prime Minister again, to take the place of another liberal, Tomé de Barros Queirós, on 30 August 1921.

== Assassination ==
During the infamous "Bloody Night" in Lisbon, on 19 October 1921, Granjo was assassinated. The political affiliation of his murderers' instigators is still a matter of dispute. That same night, two other prominent republicans of moderately right-wing sympathies, António Machado Santos (widely known as the founder of the republic) and José Carlos da Maia, also died.

== Distinctions ==
=== National orders ===
- Officer of the Military Order of Aviz (24 June 1919)

Political offices
Preceded by António Maria da Silva	Prime Minister of Portugal (President of the Ministry); 1920	Succeeded by Álvaro de Castro
Preceded by Tomé de Barros Queirós	Prime Minister of Portugal (President of the Ministry); 1921	Succeeded by Manuel Maria Coelho
