= António Machado Santos =

Portuguese politician (1875–1921)

António Machado Santos GCTE GOA
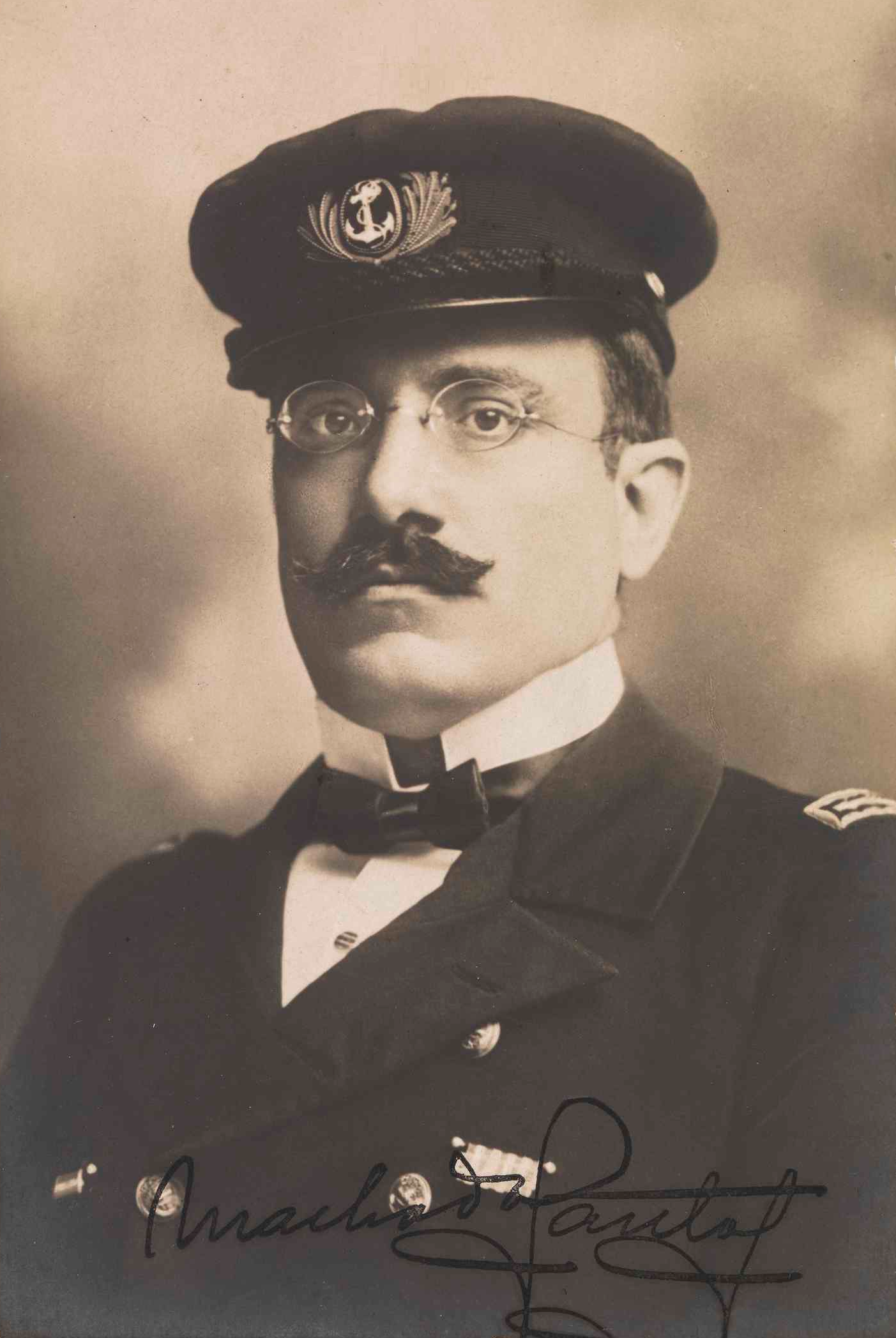
- Born: 10 January 1875; Lisbon, Portugal
- Died: 19 October 1921 (aged 46); Lisbon, Portugal
- Cause of death: Assassination
- Resting place: Alto de São João Cemetery, Lisbon
- Known for: 5 October 1910 revolution
- Spouse: Beatriz Estefânia de Oliveira
- Children: Augusto Zeferino de Azevedo Machado Santos
- Parents: Maurício Paulo Victoria dos Santos (father); Maria d'Assumpção Azevedo Machado Santos (mother)

António Maria de Azevedo Machado Santos GCTE GOA (10 January 1875 – 19 October 1921) was a Portuguese Navy officer, remembered as the "Hero of the Rotunda" for his role in the 5 October 1910 revolution.

He left a personal account of the revolution, titled A Revolução Portuguesa: Relatório de Machado Santos ("The Portuguese Revolution: A Report by Machado Santos", published in 1911), one of the most complete accounts of the preparation of the revolutionary movement.

Soon after the Republican Party started to split into different parties, he was opposed to the politics of those put in power following the revolution. He founded and published the opposition newspaper O Intransigente ("The Intransigent"). He established the Reformist Party and took part in the failed military coup of 27 April 1913 that aimed to topple Afonso Costa's government, and later, in 1915, supported General Pimenta de Castro's government. On 13 December 1916, he led the failed Tomar Revolt and was briefly arrested; in 1917, he was part of Sidónio Pais's military junta and government cabinets, until Pais's assassination in 1918.

In 1919, he helped suppress a monarchist counter-revolution in the north of the country; he was made a Grand Officer of the Order of Aviz on 11 March of that year, by President João do Canto e Castro. That year, he launched a new independent Republican party, which he called the National Republican Federation.

In 1921, he was assassinated during a military insurrection that became known as the Bloody Night. He was posthumously decorated with the Grand Cross of the Order of the Tower and Sword, in 1926.

== Distinctions ==
=== National orders ===
- Grand Cross of the Order of the Tower and Sword (4 September 1926)
- Grand Officer of the Order of Aviz (11 March 1919)
