= Manuel Maria Coelho =

Prime Minister of Portugal (1857–1943)

Colonel Manuel Maria Coelho
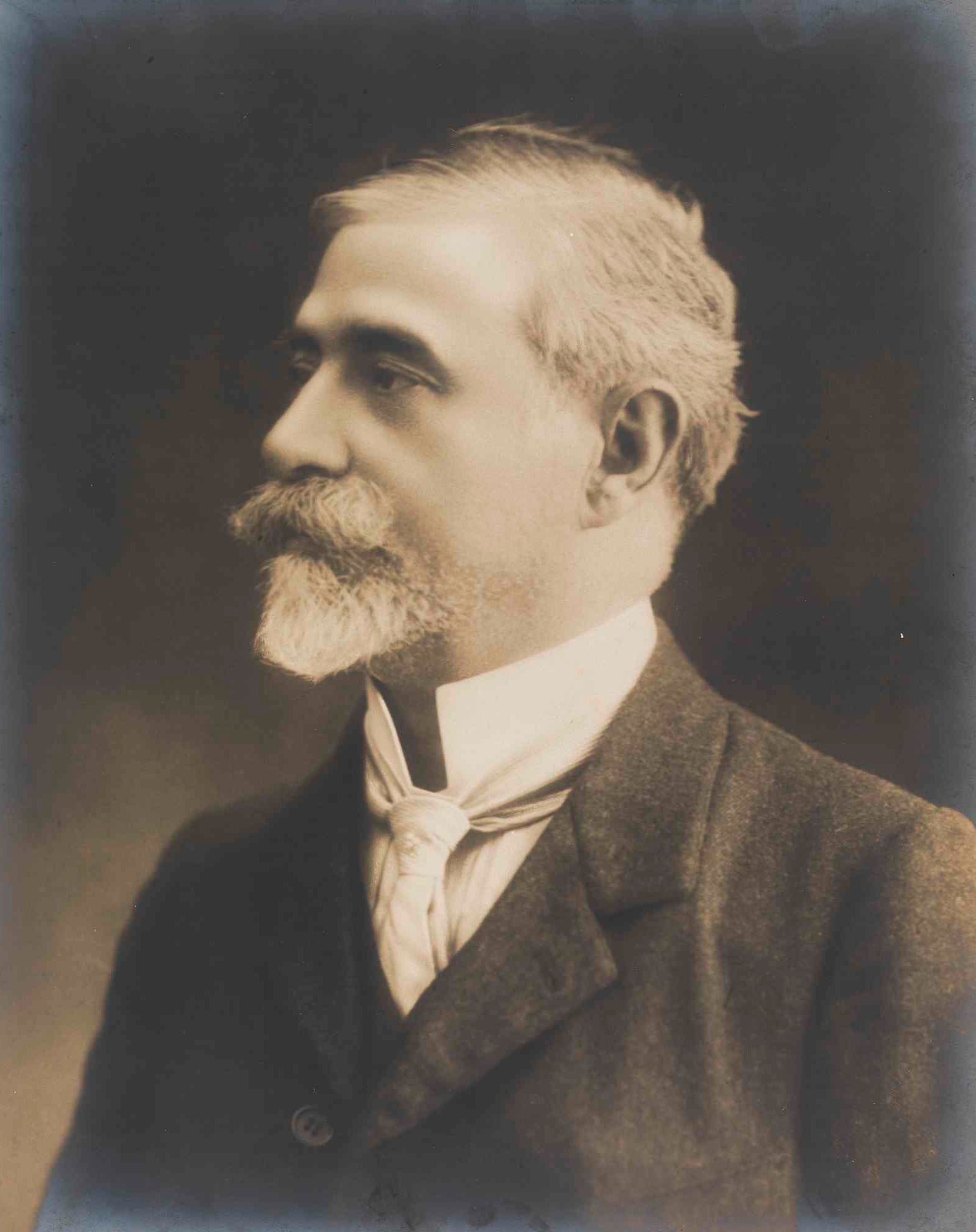

Prime Minister of Portugal
- In office 20 October 1921 – 5 November 1921
- President: António José de Almeida
- Preceded by: António Granjo
- Succeeded by: Carlos Maia Pinto

Minister of the Interior of Portugal
- In office 19 October – 5 November 1921
- President: António José de Almeida
- Prime Minister: Himself
- Preceded by: António Granjo
- Succeeded by: Carlos Maia Pinto

Minister of the Colonies of Portugal
- Interim; 21 October – 22 October 1921
- President: António José de Almeida
- Prime Minister: Himself
- Preceded by: José Eduardo de Carvalho Crato (not sworn it)
- Succeeded by: Carlos Maia Pinto

Minister of Labour of Portugal
- Interim; 2 November – 5 November 1921
- President: António José de Almeida
- Prime Minister: Himself
- Preceded by: Alfredo Azevedo e Sousa
- Succeeded by: António Alberto Torres Garcia

Governor-General of Angola
- In office 18 January 1911 – 26 January 1912
- President: Teófilo Braga; Manuel de Arriaga
- Prime Minister: Teófilo Braga; João Chagas; Augusto de Vasconcelos
- Minister of the Colonies: Amaro de Azevedo Gomes; Celestino de Almeida; José de Freitas Ribeiro; António Macieira (as interim)
- Preceded by: Caetano Francisco Cláudio Eugénio Gonçalves
- Succeeded by: Manuel Moreira da Fonseca

Governor of Portuguese Guinea
- In office 10 January – 13 July 1917
- President: Bernardino Machado
- Prime Minister: António José de Almeida; Afonso Costa
- Minister of the Colonies: António José de Almeida; Ernesto de Vilhena
- Preceded by: José António de Andrade Sequeira
- Succeeded by: Carlos Ivo de Sá Ferreira

Personal details
- Born: 6 March 1857 Chaves, Portugal
- Died: 9 January 1943 (aged 85) Lisbon, Portugal
- Party: Independent

Military service
- Allegiance: Kingdom of Portugal; Portugal
- Branch/service: Portuguese Army
- Years of service: 1880–1926
- Rank: Colonel

Antonio Manuel Maria Coelho (6 March 1857 – 9 January 1943) was a Portuguese military officer of the Portuguese Army and politician during the period of the Portuguese First Republic.

In January 1891, he was one of the leading revolutionaries during the Porto republican revolt. Among other posts, he served as governor of Portuguese Angola and governor of Portuguese Guinea. He became prime minister after the Noite Sangrenta (Bloody Night) terrorist assassinations of prominent state figures (including Prime Minister António Granjo) on 19 October 1921.

A Freemason (like many of his colleagues), he was co-author, along with João Chagas, of the work História da Revolta do Porto (History of the Porto Revolt).

Political offices
| Preceded by António Granjo | Prime Minister of Portugal (President of the Ministry); 1921 | Succeeded by Carlos Maia Pinto |
