= António José de Almeida =

President of Portugal from 1919 to 1923

His Excellency António José de Almeida GCTE GCC GCA GCSE
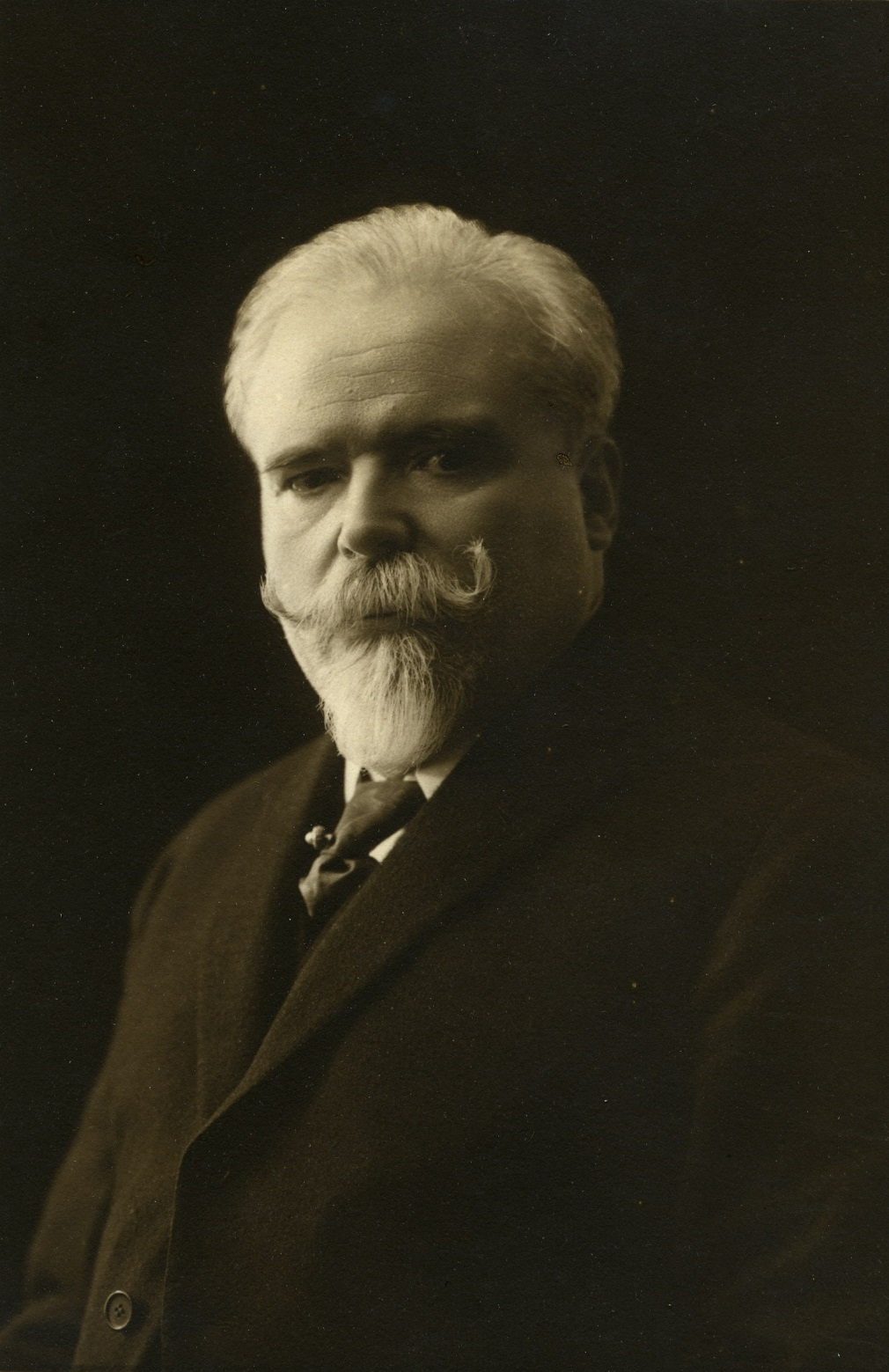
- Portrait, 1920-1922

President of Portugal
- In office 5 October 1919 – 5 October 1923
- Prime Minister: Alfredo de Sá Cardoso; Francisco Fernandes Costa; Domingos Pereira; António Maria Baptista; José Ramos Preto; António Maria da Silva; António Granjo; Álvaro de Castro; Liberato Pinto; Bernardino Machado; Tomé de Barros Queirós; António Granjo; Manuel Maria Coelho; Carlos Maia Pinto; Francisco Cunha Leal; António Maria da Silva
- Preceded by: João do Canto e Castro
- Succeeded by: Manuel Teixeira Gomes

Prime Minister of Portugal
- In office 16 March 1916 – 25 April 1917
- President: Bernardino Machado
- Preceded by: Afonso Costa
- Succeeded by: Afonso Costa

Ministerial portfolios
- 1917–1917: Finance
- 1916–1917: Colonies
- 1916–1916: Interior
- 1916–1916: Education
- 1916–1916: Finance
- 1916–1916: Colonies
- 1910–1911: Interior

Personal details
- Born: 27 July 1866 Vale da Vinha, Portugal
- Died: 31 October 1929 (aged 63) Lisbon, Portugal
- Party: Portuguese Republican; Evolutionist; Republican Liberal
- Spouse: Maria Joana Queiroga
- Children: Maria Teresa
- Occupation: Politician
- Profession: Physician

António José de Almeida (Note: European Portuguese pronunciation: [ɐ̃ˈtɔni.u ʒuˈzɛ ðɨ alˈmɐjðɐ, ɐ̃ˈtɔnju -].) GCTE GCC GCA GCSE (27 July 1866 – 31 October 1929) was a Portuguese politician who served as the president of Portugal from 1919 to 1923. António José de Almeida also served as prime minister from 1916 to 1917. He was the only president of the First Portuguese Republic to serve the entire term.

== Early career ==
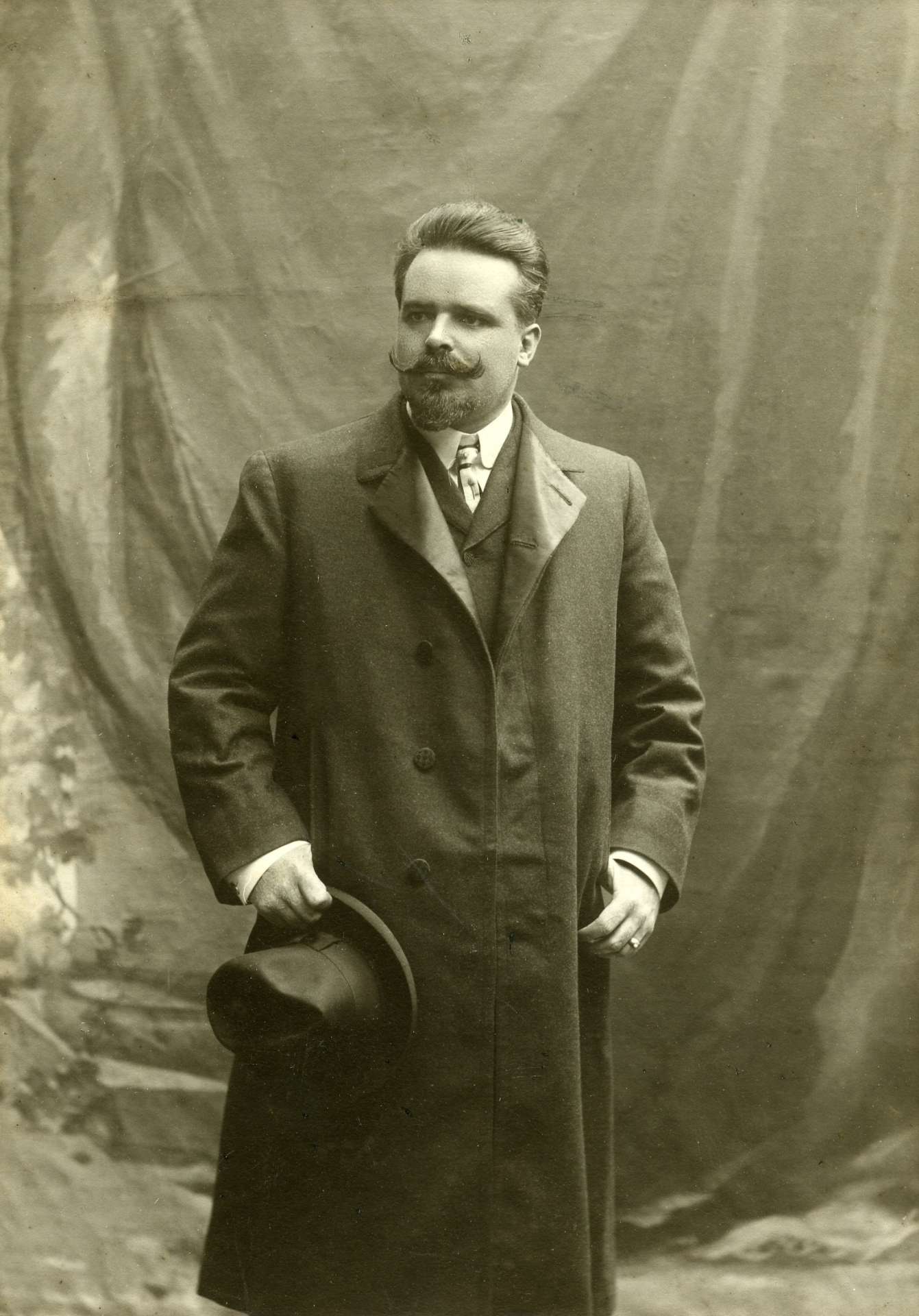
António José de Almeida in 1903–1904. This portrait was later chosen by him as his official portrait.

Born in Penacova to José António de Almeida and his wife Maria Rita das Neves, Almeida studied medicine at the University of Coimbra and became a medical doctor. During his term as Minister for the Interior, he was the founder of both the University of Lisbon and the University of Porto in 1911. He was one of the most eloquent republican tribunes, and, after the 5 October 1910 revolution, as interior minister he led the moderate wing of the Portuguese Republican Party, that opposed Afonso Costa. The moderates elected Manuel de Arriaga for first elected President, on 24 August 1911, defeating Afonso Costa's candidate, Bernardino Machado.

António José de Almeida founded his own party, the Evolutionist Party, that was in the opposition. On 12 June 1916 he became Minister for Finance and also Prime Minister of Portugal. Later, both the Evolutionist Party and the Republican Union, Manuel de Brito Camacho's party, joined to form the new Republican Liberal Party, in 1919, that went on to win the legislative elections.

== Presidency ==
On 6 August 1919, António José de Almeida was elected the 6th President of the Republic, and was the only President of the First Republic, that completed the full four years mandate. He faced the greatest political instability of the regime and almost resigned. He was also remembered for his voyage to Brazil, in 1922, during the centennial of that country's independence from Portugal, where he was noted as a brilliant speaker.

== Personal life ==
He married on 14 December 1910 to Maria Joana de Morais Perdigão Queiroga, daughter with her younger sisters Antónia and Catarina of Joaquim José Perdigão Queiroga (b. Évora) and first wife Maria Cândida de Morais and half-sister of Perdigão Queiroga. On 27 December 1911 they had an only daughter Maria Teresa Queiroga de Almeida, married to medical doctor Júlio Gomes da Cunha de Abreu.

== Honours ==
- Sash and Grand-Cross of the Three Orders, as President of the Republic and Grand-Master of the Portuguese Honorific Orders (1919–1923)
- Grand-Cross of the Order of the Tower and of the Sword, of Valour, Loyalty and Merit, Portugal (10 July 1919)
- Grand-Cross of the Order of Christ, Portugal (16 October 1919)
- Grand-Cross of the Order of Aviz, Portugal (16 October 1919)
- Grand-Cross of the Order of Saint James of the Sword, Portugal (16 October 1919)

== Notes ==
Political offices
Preceded by Afonso Costa	Prime Minister of Portugal; 1916; 1916–1917	Succeeded by Afonso Costa
Preceded by João do Canto e Castro	President of Portugal; 1919–1923	Succeeded by Manuel Teixeira Gomes
