= O Primeiro de Janeiro =

Portuguese daily newspaper

- Type: Daily newspaper
- Format: Broadsheet
- Owner(s): Eduardo Costa
- Founded: 1868; 157 years ago
- Political alignment: Left-liberal
- Language: Portuguese
- Headquarters: Porto
- ISSN: 0873-6448
- Website: https://oprimeirodejaneiro.com.pt/

O Primeiro de Janeiro (lit. the first of January) was a Portuguese daily newspaper published in Porto, Portugal.

== History and profile ==
O Primeiro de Janeiro was based in Porto where it was founded in 1868. Its title is a reference to the reform movement initiated on 1 January.

The paper was directed by Eduardo Costa and has a left-liberal stance.

== See also ==
- List of newspapers in Portugal
