= May 14 Revolt =

1915 revolt in Portugal

14 May 1915 Revolt
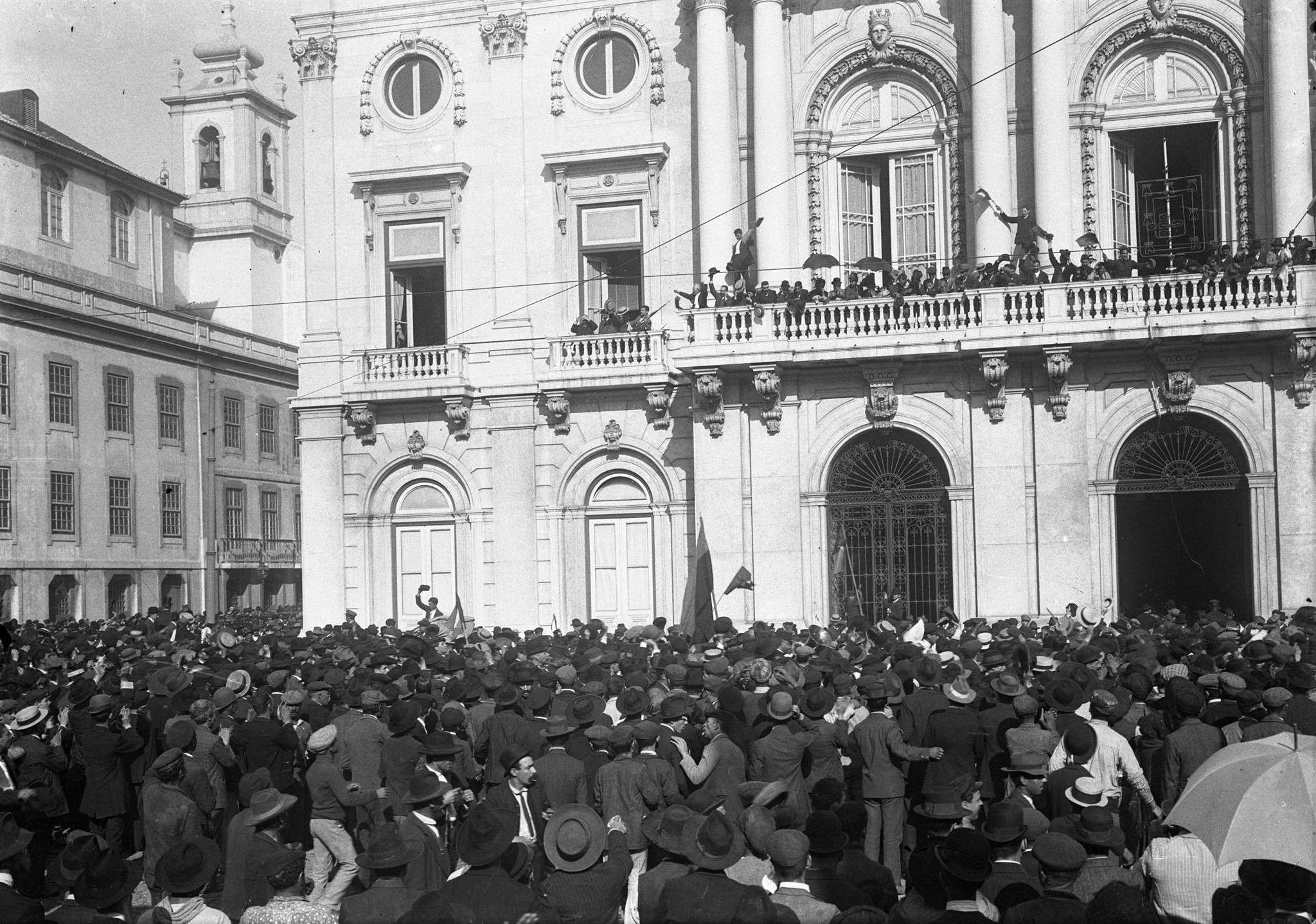
- The population in front of Lisbon City Hall watches the proclamation of the Constitutional Junta
Date	14 May 1915
Location	Portugal
Result	Republican victory: End of General Pimenta de Castro's government; 1915 Portuguese legislative election

Belligerents
Portuguese Government	Republicans

Commanders and leaders
Pimenta de Castro	António Maria da Silva; Álvaro de Castro; José de Freitas Ribeiro; José Norton de Matos; Alfredo de Sá Cardoso; Leote de Rego

Casualties and losses
- 102 dead and hundreds wounded, of which 250 severely

The May 14 Revolt (1915) was a politico-military uprising led by Álvaro de Castro and General Sá Cardoso which started in Lisbon, Portugal, with the objective of taking power from the dictatorship of General Pimenta de Castro during the Portuguese First Republic and returning the government to the principles of the 1911 Constitution.

== Background ==
The Revolt was the consequence of the events during the Presidency of Manuel de Arriaga. At the height of political instability, when many of the Parties in the legislature were openly hostile to each other and the Assembly was unmanageable, the former president (finding no consensus) wishing to reduce the influence of the Portuguese Republican Party, dissolved the National Assembly unilaterally, and, on 25 January 1915, installed Pimenta de Castro to run the government.

Castro immediately appointed several military officers in various ministries, dissolved the National Assembly, and ran the government as a dictator. He allowed the re-opening of monarchist organizations, three monarchist papers, and their members amnestied, including Henrique Paiva de Couceiro (who had led monarchist counter-revolutionary campaigns into northern Portugal). As a result of these actions Pimenta de Castro, Machado dos Santos, António José de Almeida and President Manuel de Arriaga were branded traitors to the Republic.

On 24 February 1915, Castro's government directly issued a new electoral law and postponed the elections (previously set for 7 March 1915) indefinitely). Furthermore, it used the military to stop Parliament from resuming its sittings on March 4, ignoring the law.

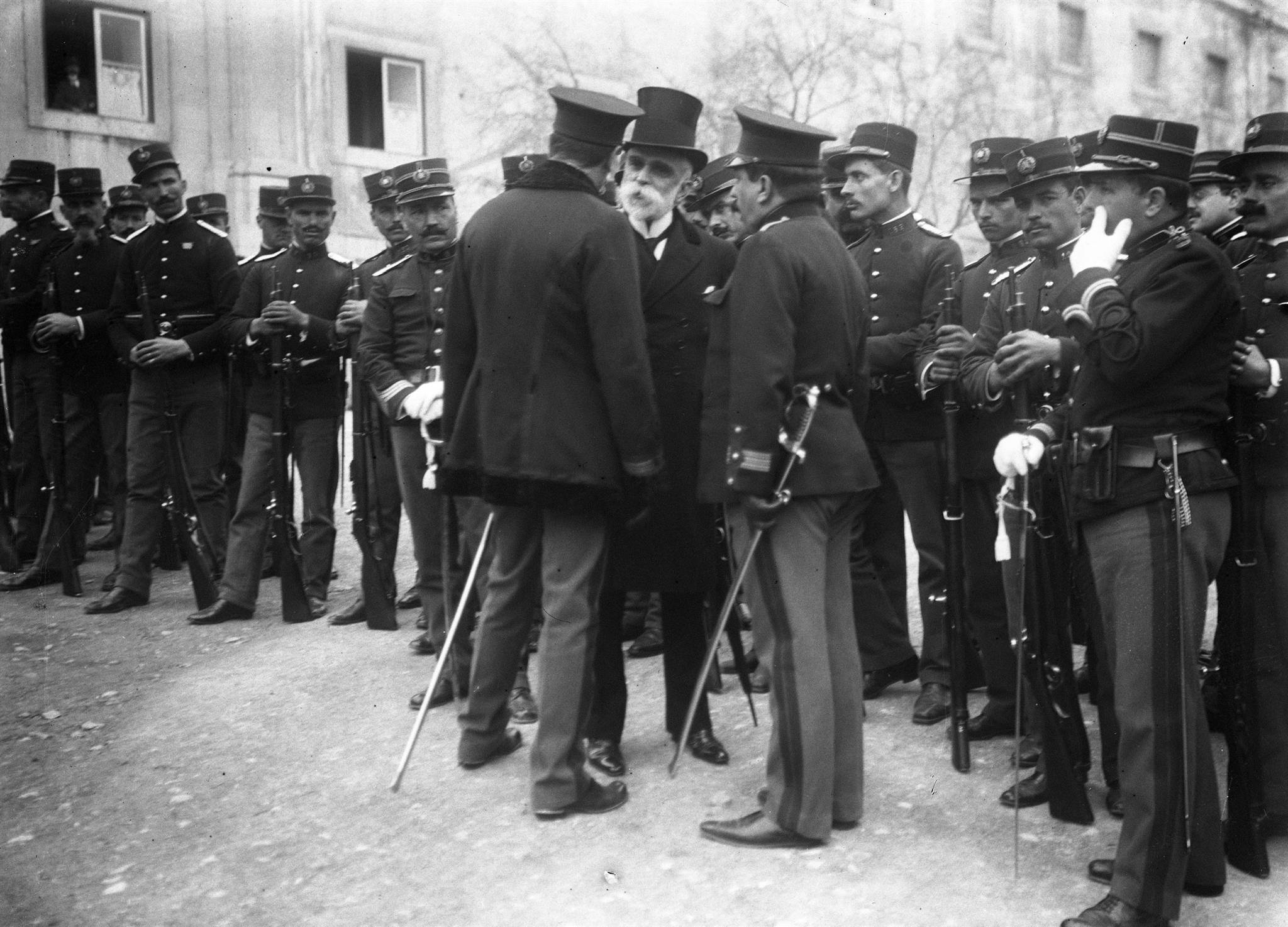
When general Pimenta de Castro's government has Parliament shut down, senator Bernardino Machado protests to an officer of the Republican National Guard (Portugal, 4 March 1915).

As the government had been appointed when the Assembly was not in session, the politicians demanded the resumption of sittings on March 4. This was refused, since the President was under no legal obligation to open the Assembly. Refused admittance to the National Assembly, the politicians gathered at the Palácio da Mitra, and decided to openly attack the government; they established, as a legally constituted assembly, that the acts of Pimenta de Castro and President Arriaga were unlawful, undemocratic and void, and were willing to take power by force.

It was at this time that they decided to form a Revolutionary Junta to seize power. In addition to General Sá Cardoso and Álvaro de Castro, the Junta included Norton de Matos, José de Freitas Ribeiro, and António Maria da Silva and they were dependent on Leote de Rego to command the Navy's revolutionary forces. The coup d'état would be similar to the 5 October revolution, supported by the Navy (the group that was most favorable to the republicans) and armed civil groups, in particular the Carbonária and Formiga Branca (especially if it seemed that the army would not support the attempt, or if it was determined that they could not be trusted).

== The revolt ==
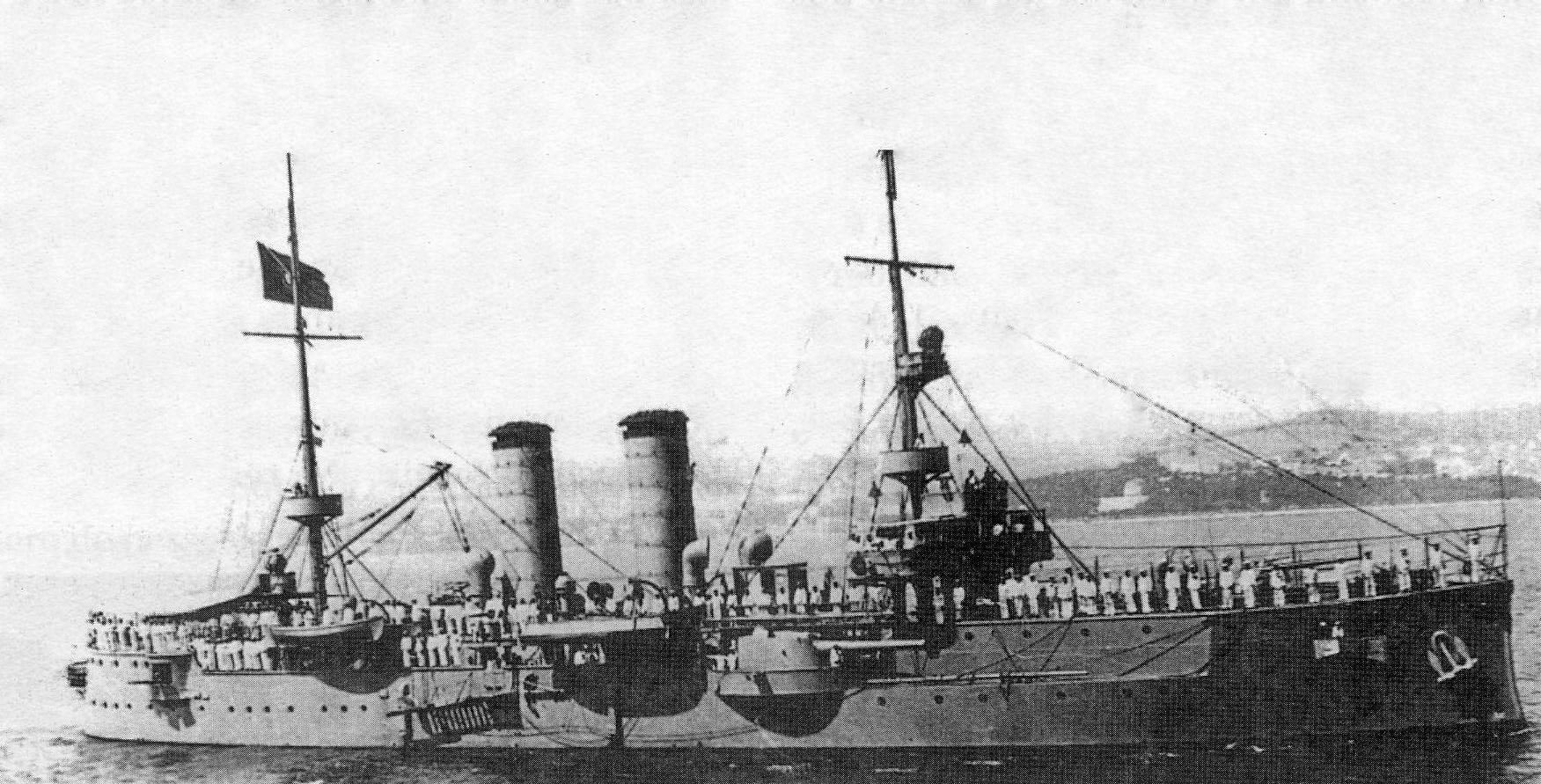
Portuguese Navy cruiser NRP Vasco da Gama, used in the bombardment and support of revolutionary forces in the Tagus River on May 14, 1915

On the morning of May 14, a group of revolutionaries that included naval marines, army soldiers, some men from the Fiscal Guard (Portuguese: Guarda Fiscal), the National Republican Guard (Portuguese: Guarda Nacional Republicana) and accompanied by members of the Carbonária occupied the Naval Arsenal, in Lisbon, immediately taking possession of the arms.

Around 3 a.m., captain Leote de Rego, using a longboat, led the rebels in taking control of the Vasco da Gama Cruiser. The rebel navy forces proceeded to take control of other ships anchored in the Tagus River. At 3:20 a.m., Vasco da Gama shot three blanks and, together with other rebel vessels, took position in front of Terreiro do Paço. Shortly after 4 a.m., the Army Arsenal was attacked by armed citizens and members of the Fiscal Guard, with Vasco da Gama's support. The rebel forces took over the Arsenal three hours later.

The reaction from the Castro government troops was timid and apprehensive. The 16th Infantry, commanded by Colonel Gomes da Costa, encircled the Naval Arsenal, but were violently bombarded by the ships in the Tagus River, including the cruiser NRP Vasco da Gama. The artillery attempted to bombard the ships, but their forces were repulsed from the heights of Santa Catarina. Yet, Álvaro de Castro was fearful that loyal government troops in Lisbon would counter-attack and traveled to Santarém in order to shore up republican forces.

During subsequent hours on May 14, members of Pimenta de Castro's government escaped to the protection of the barracks in the Largo do Carmo, due to the disproportionate forces that were armed against them, and by the end of the afternoon had surrendered. Around 4 p.m., Pimenta de Castro accepted to give his resignation to President Manuel de Arriaga.

Although rapid, the May 14 Revolt was quite violent; many residents and protestors battled the police and were mortally wounded or injured, during the events of the insurrection: 200 people were killed, and approximately, 1000 were injured. João Chagas, the former prime minister, was blinded by a gunshot in the location of the Entroncamento, by Senator João José de Freitas. The aggressor was immediately lynched by the gathered crowd. The majority of the deaths did not occur from the bombardments on May 14, but occurred in the following days, as members of the Carbonária and Formiga Branca pursued the combatants and made ajustes de contas (English: reprisal killings). Between May 14 and 17 there was no existing law in the streets of Lisbon, allowing the members of the Carbonária and Formiga Branca to pillage, assassinate and conduct political retributions on their enemies; more than 20 police officers and officer cadets were summarily executed in the streets, police stations were attacked, private homes assaulted and clubs whose proprietors supported Pimenta de Castro were vandalized. Some Republican vigilantes proceeded to attack the newspapers that supported Pimenta de Castro, the monarchist's papers, and Machado Santo's O Intransigente. Afonso Costa, would later eulogize the members of the Formiga Branca, in the pages of the newspaper O Mundo:

"The truth is that the Formiga Branca, as an association or revolutionary institution, does not exist. What is referred to as the Formiga Branca is only people that love the Republic, today as on the 5th of October, and who, for great love, zealously watch and defend her. The Portuguese Republican Party does not have to repudiate this Formiga Branca, because the Portuguese Republican Party has to be, and is, a popular Party, in the exact sense of the term."

The attacks motivated the French, Spanish and English governments to send contingents to mitigate the violence and allow the new government to reestablish order, as well as protect their nationals. The revolt lasted until 19 May 1915.

A hundred-two people were killed during the revolt. Hundreds were injured, of which about 250 were injured severely.

== Afterward ==
The revolt was victorious in substituting the unpopular dictatorship of Castro, for a Constitutional Junta in 1915, and forcing the resignation of Manuel de Arriaga. Manuel de Arriaga resigned days after the coup, Pimenta de Castro and Machado Santos were eventually arrested and dispatched to Angra do Heroísmo. The 1915 Portuguese legislative election was scheduled, in which the Democratic Party would once again win.

Sá Cardoso would gather with other members of the victorious group at the balcony of the Lisbon town hall to proclaim their victory. With order restored Teófilo Braga became President and the Democratic Party leader, João Chagas, was nominated to head the government, but was unable to take-up his position, as he was in the hospital from the injuries sustained during the revolt.
