= Provisional government of the Portuguese Republic =

Government of Portugal between 1910 and 1911, led by Teófilo Braga

Seal of the Provisional Government of the Portuguese Republic

The Provisional government of the Portuguese Republic (Portuguese: Governo Provisório da República Portuguesa) was the cabinet of the Portuguese Government formed following the 5 October 1910 revolution and the establishment of the Portuguese Republic. It was sworn in on the day of the Revolution, being composed solely by the Portuguese Republican Party, and it stayed in office until the approval of the 1911 Constitution.

== Composition ==
The government was composed by 8 ministers. The President of the Provisional Government, Teófilo Braga, was simultaneously the head of State and the head of government.

Office	Minister	Party	Start of term	End of term
President of the Provisional Government	Teófilo Braga	PRP	5 October 1910	4 September 1911
Minister of Foreign Affairs	Bernardino Machado	PRP	5 October 1910	4 September 1911
Minister of Finance	Basílio Teles	PRP	5 October 1910	12 October 1910
Minister of Finance	José Relvas	PRP	12 October 1910	4 September 1911
Minister of the Interior	António José de Almeida	PRP	5 October 1910	4 September 1911
Minister of Justice	Afonso Costa	PRP	5 October 1910	4 September 1911
Minister of Public Works, Commerce and Industry	António Luís Gomes	PRP	5 October 1910	22 November 1910
Minister of Public Works, Commerce and Industry	Manuel de Brito Camacho	PRP	22 November 1910	4 September 1911
Minister of War	António Xavier Correia Barreto	PRP	5 October 1910	4 September 1911
Minister of the Navy and Colonies	Amaro de Azevedo Gomes	PRP	5 October 1910	4 September 1911
