= Victor Hugo de Azevedo Coutinho =

Portuguese politician (1871–1955)

Captain Victor Hugo de Azevedo Coutinho 18th Count of Azevedo
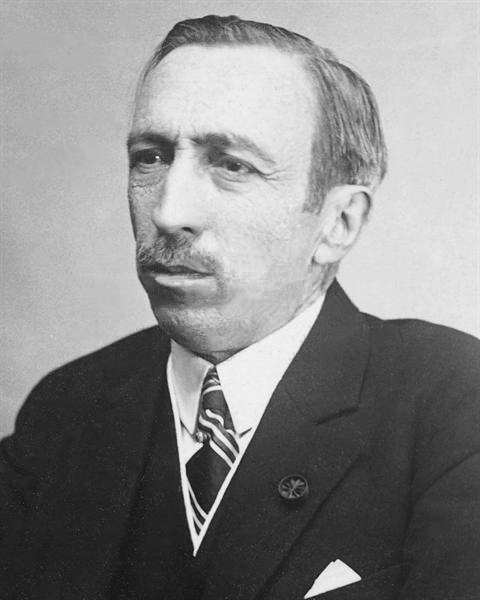

Prime Minister of Portugal
- In office 12 December 1914 – 25 January 1915
- President: Manuel de Arriaga
- Preceded by: Bernardino Machado
- Succeeded by: Joaquim Pimenta de Castro

Minister of the Navy of Portugal
- In office 12 December 1914 – 25 January 1915
- President: Manuel de Arriaga
- Prime Minister: Himself
- Preceded by: Augusto Eduardo Neuparth
- Succeeded by: Joaquim Pimenta de Castro (as interim)
- In office 29 November 1915 – 25 April 1917
- President: Bernardino Machado
- Prime Minister: Afonso Costa; António José de Almeida
- Preceded by: José de Castro
- Succeeded by: José António Arantes Pedroso
- In office 6 February 1922 – 6 July 1923
- President: António José de Almeida; Manuel Teixeira Gomes
- Prime Minister: António Maria da Silva
- Preceded by: João Manuel de Carvalho
- Succeeded by: Abel Fontoura da Costa

Minister of Foreign Affairs of Portugal
- Interim
- In office 2 March – 28 March 1922
- President: António José de Almeida
- Prime Minister: António Maria da Silva
- Preceded by: José Maria Barbosa de Magalhães
- Succeeded by: José Maria Barbosa de Magalhães
- Interim
- In office 26 August – 12 October 1922
- President: António José de Almeida
- Prime Minister: António Maria da Silva
- Preceded by: José Maria Barbosa de Magalhães
- Succeeded by: José Maria Barbosa de Magalhães

High Commissioner and Governor-General of Mozambique
- In office November 1924 – May 1926
- President: Manuel Teixeira Gomes; Bernardino Machado
- Prime Minister: José Domingues dos Santos; Vitorino Guimarães; António Maria da Silva; Domingos Leite Pereira; António Maria da Silva
- Minister of the Colonies: Carlos de Vasconcelos; António de Paiva Gomes (as interim); Henrique Monteiro Correia da Silva; Filémon Duarte de Almeida; Isidoro Pereira Leite; Domingos Pereira; Ernesto Vieira da Rocha
- Preceded by: Manuel Moreira da Fonseca
- Succeeded by: Artur Ivens Ferraz

Personal details
- Born: 12 November 1871 Portuguese Macau
- Died: 27 June 1955 (aged 83) Lisbon, Portugal
- Party: Democratic Party
- Education: University of Coimbra
- Occupation: Naval officer (Captain)

Military service
- Allegiance: Kingdom of Portugal; Portugal
- Branch/service: Portuguese Navy
- Years of service: 1888–1933
- Battles/wars: Portuguese campaigns of pacification and occupation

Victor Hugo de Azevedo Coutinho, 18th Count of Azevedo GCC, GCA (12 November 1871 – 27 June 1955), was a Portuguese naval officer, politician and professor, at the University of Coimbra and later the Escola Naval (Naval School). He was a member of the Portuguese Democratic Party and served as the President of the Council of Ministers (Prime Minister) for the 7th government of the First Portuguese Republic (having led the country between 12 December 1914 and 25 January 1915). His government's composition was essentially made up of second-line political figures, and his government was jokingly referred to as "Os miseráveis de Victor Hugo" ("The miserables of Victor Hugo"), a play on the French author Victor Hugo's book Les Misérables.

Political offices
Preceded by Bernardino Machado	Prime Minister of Portugal (President of the Ministry); 1914–1915	Succeeded by Joaquim Pimenta de Castro
