= Duarte Leite =

Portuguese historian, mathematician, journalist, diplomat and politician

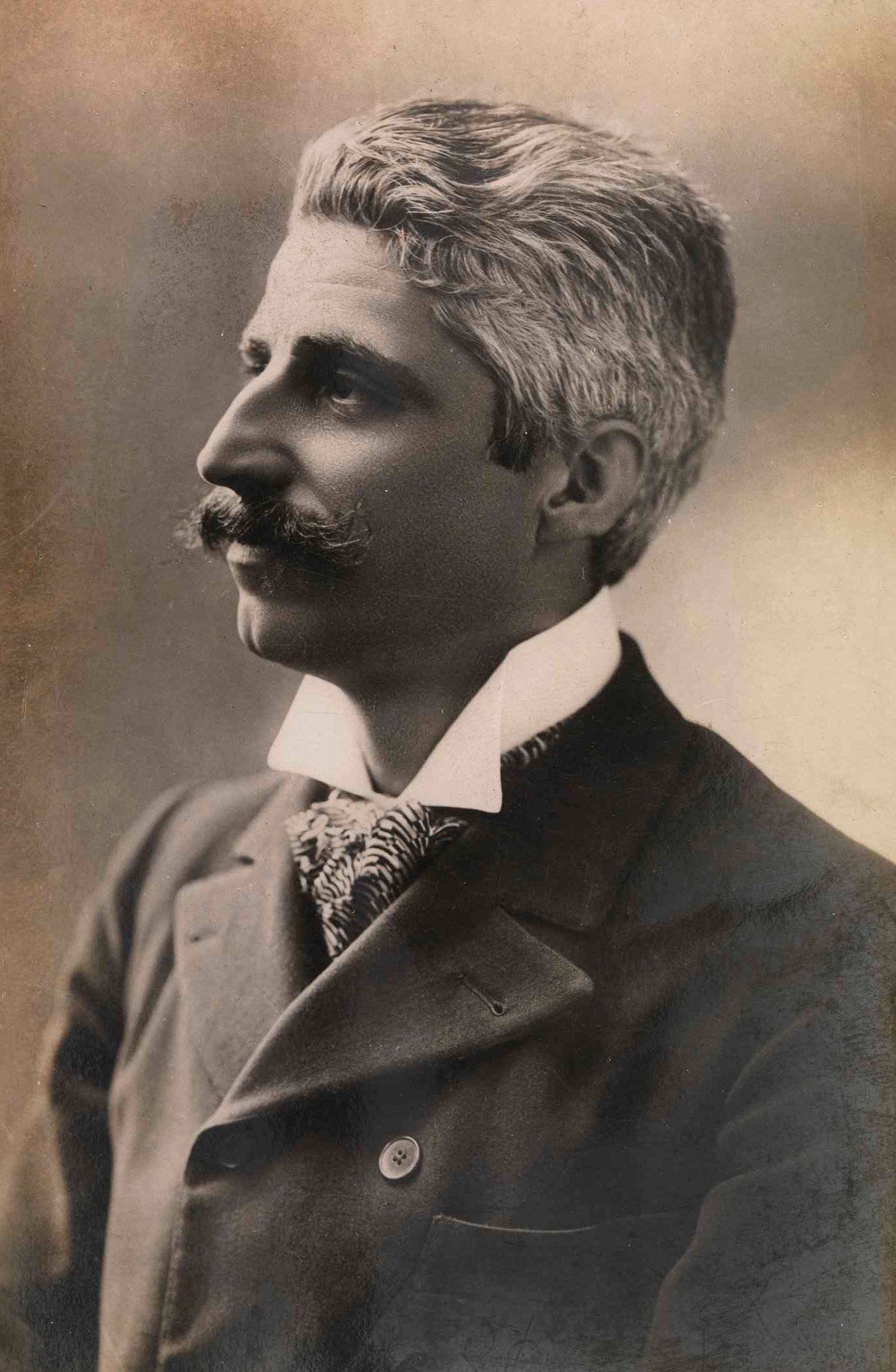

Prime Minister of Portugal
- In office 16 June 1912 – 9 January 1913
- President: Manuel de Arriaga
- Preceded by: Augusto de Vasconcelos
- Succeeded by: Afonso Costa

Ambassador of Portugal to Brazil
- In office 7 December 1912 – 1 May 1931
- Nominated by: Manuel de Arriaga
- Preceded by: Bernardino Machado
- Succeeded by: Martinho Nobre de Melo

Minister of the Interior
- In office 16 June 1912 – 9 January 1913
- Prime Minister: Himself
- Preceded by: Silvestre Falcão
- Succeeded by: Rodrigo Rodrigues

Minister of Finance
- In office 4 September 1911 – 12 November 1911
- Prime Minister: João Chagas
- Preceded by: José Relvas
- Succeeded by: Sidónio Pais

Personal details
- Born: 11 August 1864 Porto, Portugal
- Died: 29 September 1950 (aged 86) Porto, Portugal
- Party: Portuguese Republican (1897–1911); Independent (1911–1950)
- Spouse: Maria Eulália Falcão
- Children: 4
- Education: University of Coimbra

Duarte Leite Pereira da Silva, GCC (11 August 1864 in Porto – 29 September 1950 in Porto; Portuguese pronunciation: [duˈaɾtɨ ˈlɐjtɨ]), was a Portuguese historian, mathematician, journalist, diplomat and politician. He graduated in mathematics at the University of Coimbra, in 1885. He taught at the Politecnic Academy of Porto, from 1886 to 1911. Meanwhile, he was also the director of the newspaper diary "A Pátria". As a historian, he published many studies, later compiled in "História dos Descobrimentos" (History of the Discoveries), in 2 volumes.

== Political career ==
After the overthrow of the Portuguese monarchy in 1910, he was Minister of Finance during the first Augusto de Vasconcelos government (1911), and succeeded him, as Prime Minister and Minister of Internal Affairs, from 16 June 1912 to 9 January 1913.

From 1914 to 1931 he served as Portuguese ambassador to Brazil. He was a candidate to the Presidency of the Republic in the elections held in the Congress of the Republic, in 1925. Faithful all his life to his left-wing republican principles, he became a member of the 1945–48 Movement of Democratic Unity, which during its brief lifespan functioned as the first form of legalized opposition to Salazar's far-right Estado Novo (New State) regime.

Political offices
| Preceded by Augusto de Vasconcelos | Prime Minister of Portugal (President of the Ministry); 1912–1913 | Succeeded by Afonso Costa |
