= José de Castro =

Portuguese lawyer and politician (1868–1929)

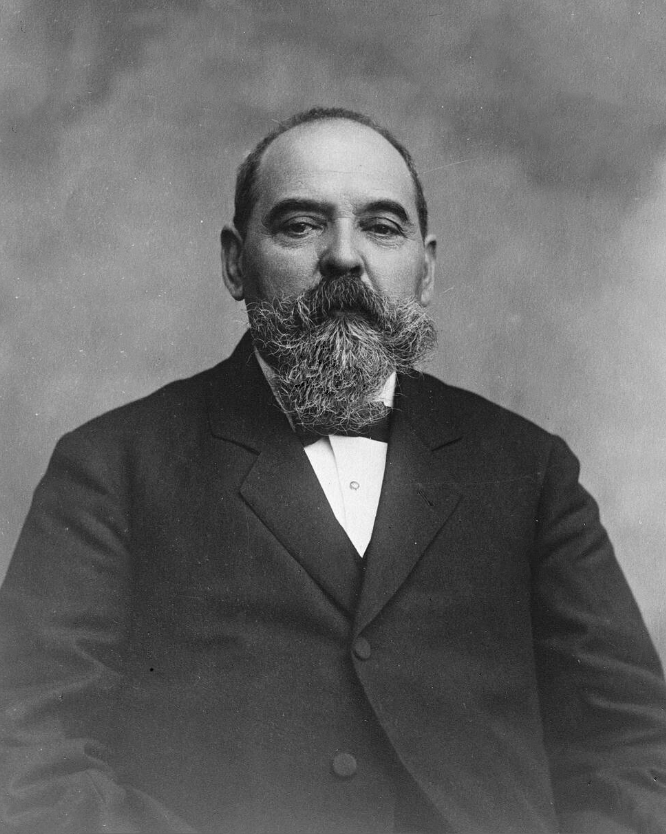
- Portrait, 1923

Prime Minister of Portugal
- In office 29 May 1915 – 30 November 1915; Acting: 17 May 1915 – 29 May 1915
- President: Manuel de Arriaga; Teófilo Braga; Bernardino Machado
- Preceded by: João Pinheiro Chagas (designate)
- Succeeded by: Afonso Costa

Personal details
- Born: 7 April 1868 Valhelhas, Portugal
- Died: 31 July 1929 (aged 61) Lisbon, Portugal
- Party: Portuguese Republican Party (later Independent)
- Spouse: Maria Benedita de Castro Pignatelli
- Children: Álvaro de Castro
- Education: University of Coimbra
- Occupation: Lawyer, journalist, newspaper editor

José Augusto Soares Ribeiro de Castro (7 April 1868 – 31 July 1929); Portuguese pronunciation: [ʒuˈzɛ ðɨ ˈkaʃtɾu], was a Portuguese lawyer, journalist and politician. He graduated in law at the University of Coimbra, and was a lawyer in Lisbon and Guarda. A member of freemasonry, he was originally a monarchist and a member of the liberal Progressive Party, but he joined the Portuguese Republican Party, in 1881. He was the main editor of the newspaper O Districto da Guarda, since its foundation in 1878, and the founder of the first republican newspaper of the province, O Povo Português, in 1882. During the Portuguese First Republic, he remained in the Republican Party. He was President of the Ministry (Prime Minister), after the failed attempt of general Joaquim Pimenta de Castro to rule without the parliament, and was in office, from 17 May to 29 November 1915.

Political offices
Preceded by João Pinheiro Chagas (designate)	Prime Minister of Portugal (President of the Ministry); 1915	Succeeded by Afonso Costa
