= 31 January 1891 revolt =

Attempted coup d'état in Portugal

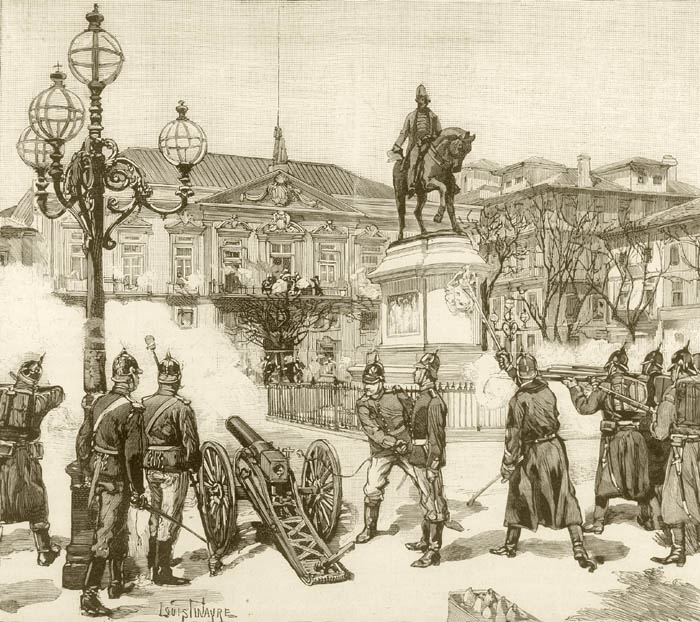
- The municipal guard attack the rebels in the city hall
Date	31 January 1891
Location	Porto, Portugal 41°08′46″N 8°36′27″W
Result	Republican rebels defeated

Casualties and losses
- 12 dead and 40 wounded
- The location of the attempted coup

The 31 January 1891 revolt was the first attempt by republicans to overthrow the monarchy in Portugal. The revolt took place in the form of a military uprising in the country's second city of Porto.

== The causes ==
The immediate cause of the revolt was the 1890 British Ultimatum, also known as Lord Salisbury's Ultimatum, which was delivered to Portugal on 11 January 1890. Portugal had attempted to claim a large area of land in southern Africa between its colonies of Mozambique and Angola, which had been included in Portugal's Pink Map prepared in 1885 to show the country's sovereignty over that land. The Ultimatum demanded the withdrawal of Portuguese forces from areas claimed by Portugal based on Portuguese exploration, as Britain claimed these on the basis of possession. The seeming ease by which the Portuguese government gave in to British demands was seen as a national humiliation by most people in Portugal, including republican opponents of the monarchy who saw the Portuguese response as evidence of the monarchy's weakness.

Portugal's Pink Map that led to the British Ultimatum of 1890

On 1 January 1891, the Portuguese Republican Party met, from which an elected committee emerged, consisting of Teófilo Braga, Manuel de Arriaga, Francisco Manuel Homem Cristo, José Jacinto Nunes, José Francisco de Azevedo e Silva, Bernardino Pereira Pinheiro and Sebastião de Magalhães Lima. These presented a long-term political action plan, which believed that, given time, a Republic would inevitably evolve. However, their leadership was not recognized by all republicans as some were calling for immediate action. These, in addition to being outraged by the outcome of the Ultimatum and seeing it as a justification for overthrowing the monarchy, were inspired by the proclamation of a Republic in the former Portuguese colony of Brazil, on 15 November 1889. Support for the Republican cause was particularly strong in Porto.

The leading figures in the revolt among the military were mainly sergeants and soldiers and it became known as the “revolt of the sergeants”. They lacked the support of any high-ranking officer. They were led by Captain António Amaral Leitão. As well, a number of civilians were involved including the lawyer and politician, Augusto Alves da Veiga, the actor Miguel Verdial, the journalist João Chagas, the photographer and film director, Aurélio da Paz dos Reis, and the writer and philosopher, Sampaio Bruno.

== The event ==
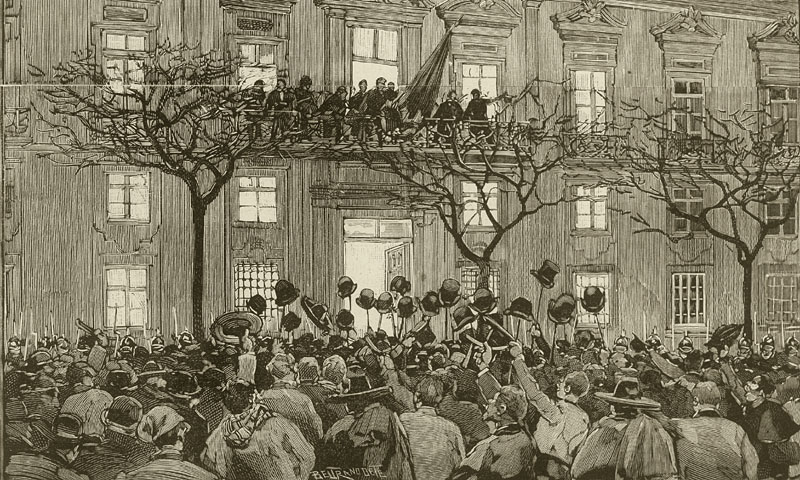
The proclamation of the Republic from the windows of the city hall

The revolt began in the early hours of 31 January, when a battalion of soldiers, led by sergeants, headed towards Campo de Santo Ovídio (today Praça da República) in Porto, where they met up with the 10th and 18th infantry regiments. However, although ready to revolt, the 18th was persuaded not to by their colonel. There were already many civilians and reporters in the area as the attempted coup had been prepared with a complete lack of secrecy. Accompanied by regimental bands, the rebels walked to the Praça de D. Pedro, (today Praça da Liberdade) where, in front of the then Porto City Council building, they heard Alves da Veiga, accompanied by other leading members of the movement, proclaim the establishment of the Republic from the balcony of the building. Verdial then read out a list of names that would make up the provisional government of the new Republic and a red and green flag was raised.

The supporters in the square then decided to take over the post and telegraph station. However, their route was blocked by a detachment of the municipal guard, positioned on the steps of the Church of Saint Ildefonso. Captain Leitão, tried to convince the guard to join them but found himself overtaken by events. In response to two shots, believed to have come from the crowd, the municipal guard let off a heavy barrage of fire. The civilians stampeded, as well as some soldiers. Around three hundred civilians and soldiers barricaded themselves in the City Hall, but the municipal guard, helped by army artillery and cavalry and by the 18th Infantry Regiment, which the rebels had tried to persuade to take part in the revolt, forced them to surrender at 10.00 on the same morning. Officially, twelve rebels and onlookers were killed and 40 injured but some sources suggest the numbers were far greater.

== The aftermath ==
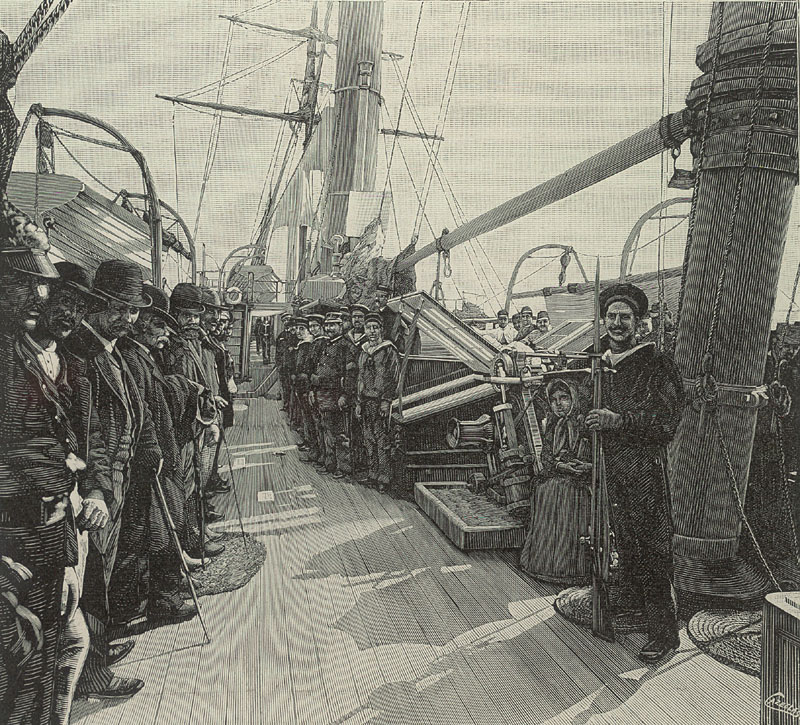
Convicted rebels on their way to exile in Africa

Some of those involved managed to flee abroad: Alves da Veiga evaded capture and went to live in Paris; Sampaio Bruno and a lawyer, António Claro, reached Spain, as did one of the military leaders, Ensign Augusto Malheiro, who emigrated from there to Brazil. Those who had had their names read out as members of the provisional government denied they had approved the use of their names and indicated that they opposed military action. The rebels were tried on board ships anchored off Leixões. In addition to civilians, 505 military personnel were tried. Around two hundred and fifty people were sentenced to between 18 months and 15 years of exile in Africa. Some civilians were released in 1893 at the time of a political amnesty.

It is still debated today whether the coup was prepared with the agreement of the republican leadership or whether it was just the result of the rashness of some members of the military, namely the sergeants, who combined dissatisfaction with their working conditions, wages, and promotion opportunities with adherence to the republican cause. A second attempted coup occurred in Lisbon on 28 January 1908. Known as the Municipal Library Elevator Coup, this also failed to overthrow the government and monarchy. A final coup, known as the 5 October 1910 revolution, after the Lisbon regicide of King Carlos on 1 February 1908, was successful, leading to the establishment of a Republic in Portugal. As soon as the Republic was established, the Rua de Santo António in Porto, where the coup supporters were shot in 1891, was renamed as the Rua de 31 de Janeiro.
