= José Relvas =

Portuguese politician (1858–1929)

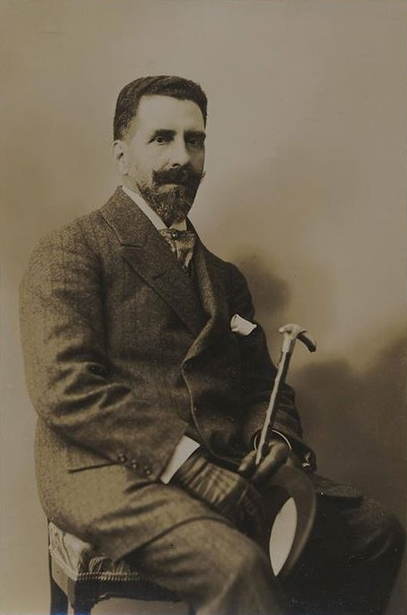

Prime Minister of Portugal
- In office 27 January 1919 – 30 March 1919
- President: João do Canto e Castro
- Preceded by: João Tamagnini Barbosa
- Succeeded by: Domingos Pereira

Minister of the Interior
- In office 27 January 1919 – 30 March 1919
- Prime Minister: Himself
- Preceded by: João Tamagnini Barbosa
- Succeeded by: Domingos Pereira

Ambassador of Portugal to Spain
- In office 19 October 1911 – 13 January 1914
- Nominated by: Manuel de Arriaga
- Preceded by: Augusto de Vasconcelos
- Succeeded by: Augusto de Vasconcelos

Minister of Finance
- In office 12 October 1910 – 3 September 1911
- Prime Minister: Provisional Government
- Preceded by: Anselmo de Andrade
- Succeeded by: Duarte Leite

Personal details
- Born: 5 March 1858 Golegã, Kingdom of Portugal
- Died: 31 October 1929 (aged 71) Alpiarça, Portuguese Republic
- Party: Portuguese Republican (later Democratic)
- Spouse: Eugénia de Loureiro Queirós Couto Leitão
- Children: Carlos, João, Maria Luísa
- Education: University of Coimbra
- Occupation: Land owner

José Maria de Mascarenhas Relvas de Campos (Golegã, Golegã, 5 March 1858 – Alpiarça, Casa dos Patudos, 31 October 1929; Portuguese pronunciation: [ʒuˈzɛ ˈʁɛlvɐʃ], was a Portuguese politician and Prime Minister of Portugal.

== Personal life ==
Jose was married to Eugénia de Loureiro Queirós Couto Leitão. He had three children: Carlos, João and Maria Luísa.

== Political career ==
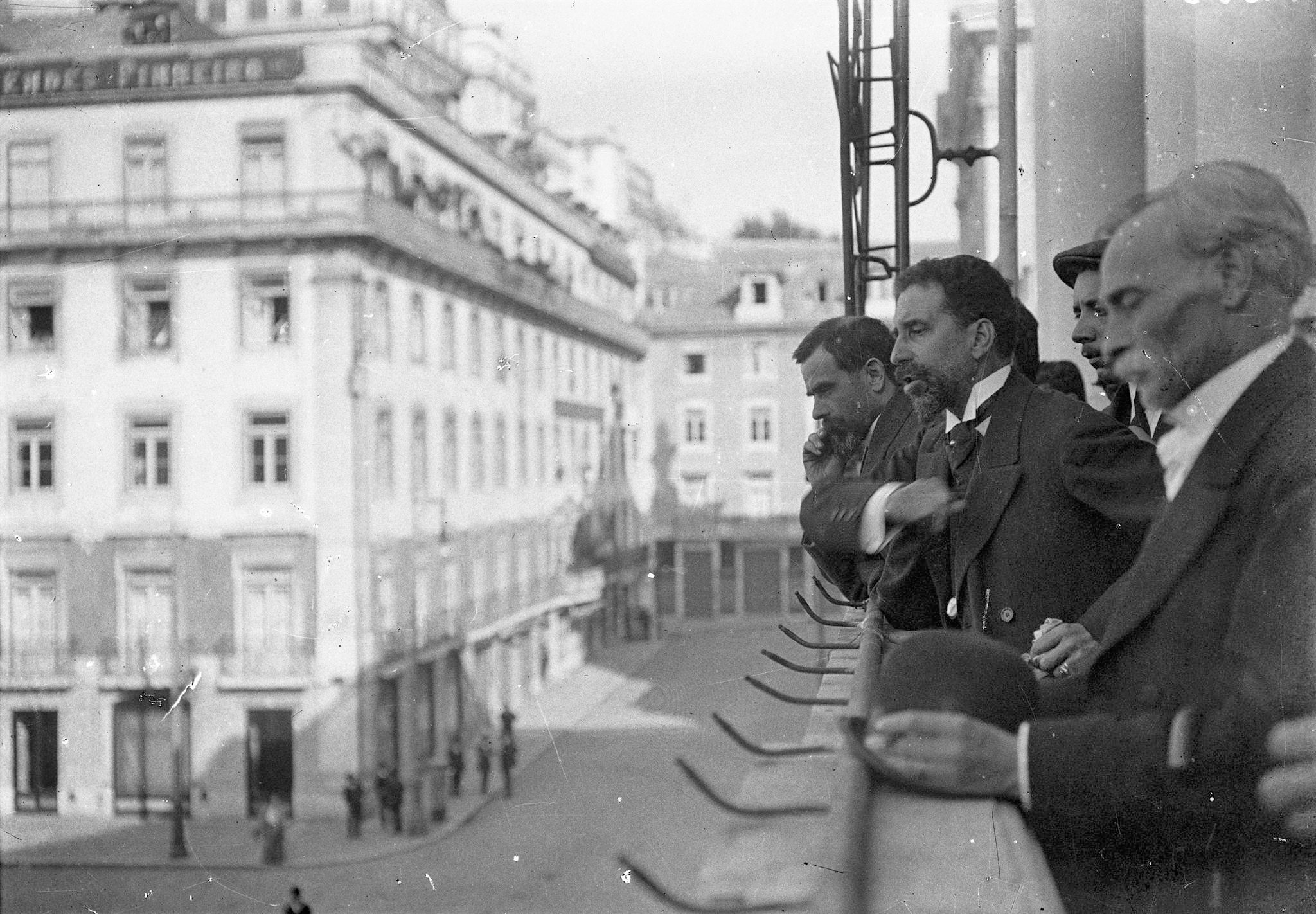
José Relvas proclaims the Republic from the balcony of the City Hall

An historic republican, he proclaimed the republic from the balcony of the Municipal Chamber of Lisbon, on 5 October 1910. He was the second Minister of Finance during the provisional government led by Teófilo Braga, from 12 October 1910 to 3 September 1911.

After that, he served as ambassador of Portugal in Madrid, from 1911 to 1914. He was President of the Ministry (Prime Minister), from 27 January to 30 March 1919, in one of the many short-lived governments of the Portuguese First Republic. His house in Alpiarça is now a museum, the Casa dos Patudos, where his art collection is exhibited, which consists of over 13,000 glass negatives.

Political offices
Preceded by João Tamagnini Barbosa	Prime Minister of Portugal (President of the Ministry); 1919	Succeeded by Domingos Leite Pereira
