= Augusto de Vasconcelos =

Portuguese politician

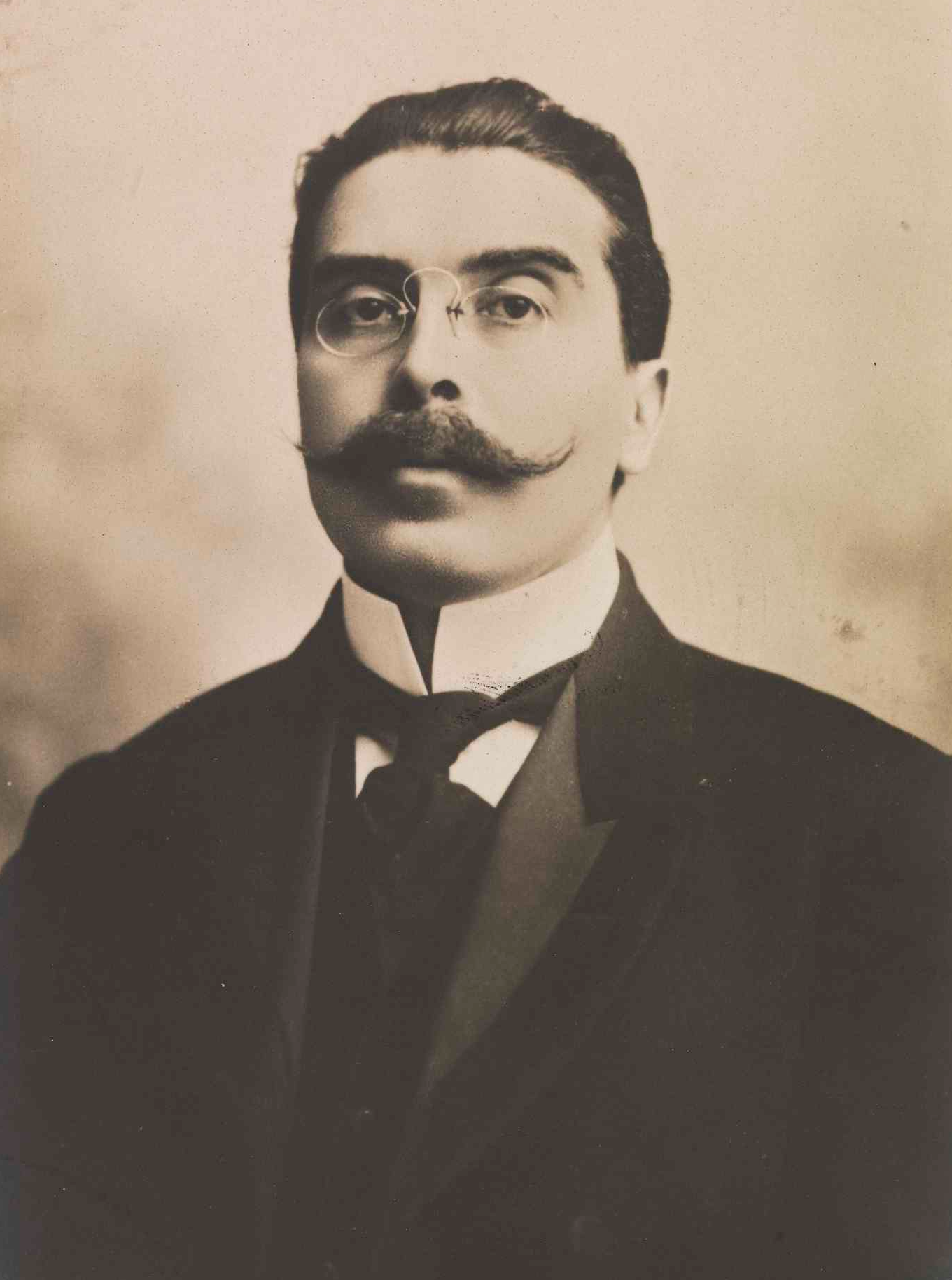
- Portrait, c. 1910

Prime Minister of Portugal
- In office 12 November 1911 – 16 June 1912
- President: Manuel de Arriaga
- Preceded by: João Chagas
- Succeeded by: Duarte Leite

Ambassador of Portugal to Spain
- In office 13 August 1914 – 3 March 1918
- Nominated by: Manuel de Arriaga
- Preceded by: José Relvas
- Succeeded by: António Egas Moniz
- In office 11 April 1911 – 12 October 1911
- Nominated by: Provisional Government
- Preceded by: Count of Tovar
- Succeeded by: José Relvas

Ambassador of Portugal to the United Kingdom
- In office 11 March 1918 – 17 May 1919
- Nominated by: Sidónio Pais
- Preceded by: Manuel Teixeira Gomes
- Succeeded by: Manuel Teixeira Gomes

Minister of Foreign Affairs
- In office 12 October 1911 – 9 January 1913
- Prime Minister: João Chagas; Himself; Duarte Leite
- Preceded by: João Chagas
- Succeeded by: António Macieira

Personal details
- Born: 25 September 1867 Lisbon, Portugal
- Died: 27 September 1951 (aged 84) Lisbon, Portugal
- Party: Portuguese Republican Party
- Spouse: Hermínia Laura de Albuquerque Moreira
- Children: 4

Augusto César de Almeida de Vasconcelos Correia, GCSE (24 September 1867 – 27 September 1951), better known as Augusto de Vasconcelos (Portuguese pronunciation: [awˈɣuʃtu ðɨ vaʃkõˈsɛluʃ]) was a Portuguese surgeon, politician and diplomat, who served as Prime Minister of Portugal.

== Career ==
He graduated at the Lisbon Medico-Surgical School in 1891, where he also taught, later becoming a professor of the Faculty of Medicine of the University of Lisbon.

A republican since his youth, he was minister of foreign affairs of the first Constitutional Government of the Portuguese First Republic, whose prime minister was João Pinheiro Chagas, from 12 October 1911 to 12 November 1911. He succeeded Chagas as prime minister of another Portuguese Republican Party government, which was in power from 11 November 1911 to 4 June 1912. In that government, too, he held the post of foreign minister as well as that of prime minister. He was foreign minister again from 16 June 1912 to 9 January 1913.

Later he served as plenipotentiary minister in Madrid (1914–1918) and London (1918–1919), during World War I, which Portugal entered in 1916 on the Allies' side. Subsequently, he led the Portuguese delegation at the Peace Conference, in Paris, in 1919.

After that he concentrated on diplomacy, in the service of the League of Nations as a delegate of Portugal. He helped to solve international conflicts, like the Chaco War between Bolivia and Paraguay in 1935. From 1935 to 1937 he occupied the office of President of the League of Nations.

== Decorations ==
He received the Grand Crosses of the Order of Saint James of the Sword, the Order of Isabel the Catholic, the Order of the Crown of Belgium and both the Orders of Merit of Chile and Peru and was Grand Officer of the Légion d'honneur of France, etc.

== Family ==
He was a son of Júlio César de Vasconcelos Correia (Lisbon, Santos-o-Velho or Santa Catarina, 21 December 1837 – Lisbon, Santos-o-Velho, 31 December 1910), an Engineer and a Shipbuilder, and wife (m. Lisbon, Encarnação) Constança Libânia Auta de Almeida (Lisbon, Santos o Velho, c. 1840 – Lisbon, Santos-o-Velho, 13 March 1926). His father was a natural son of António César de Vasconcelos Correia, 1st Viscount and 1st Count of Torres Novas and 93rd Governor-General of India, thus being a second cousin once removed of Fernando Peyroteo and three times removed of José Couceiro.

He married in Lisbon, Santa Catarina, Hermínia Laura de Albuquerque Henriques Moreira (Castelo Branco, Sé, 2 September 1869 – Lisbon, Santa Catarina, 28 September 1947), widow of Augusto Pereira Leite and daughter of José Joaquim Henriques Moreira (Lisbon, Alcântara, 29 April 1820 – 6 January 1895), division general, commander of the Municipal Guard, Commander of the Order of Aviz and Knight of the Order of the Tower and Sword, etc., and wife (m. 7 November 1868) Maria Hermínia de Albuquerque de Mesquita e Paiva (15 October 1844 – 7 June 1910), daughter of the 2nd Viscount (formerly Barons) of Oleiros, and had:

- Júlio Moreira de Vasconcelos (b. 15 July 1906), a medical doctor, unmarried and without issue
- Maria Teresa Moreira de Vasconcelos, unmarried and without issue
- José Moreira de Vasconcelos (b. 28 May 1910), an engineer, married to Maria Gabriela de Sampaio e Melo, and had issue:
  - Maria de Sampaio e Melo de Vasconcelos, unmarried and without issue
  - José Maria de Sampaio e Melo de Vasconcelos, unmarried and without issue
  - Maria Isabel de Sampaio e Melo de Vasconcelos, unmarried and without issue
  - Augusto António de Sampaio e Melo de Vasconcelos, married to Maria Helena do Patrocínio Nogueira
  - Maria José de Sampaio e Melo de Vasconcelos, married to José Afonso de Almada Negreiros (born 1934), son of José Sobral de Almada Negreiros and wife Sarah Afonso
  - Maria Micaela de Sampaio e Melo de Vasconcelos, married to politician Raúl Miguel de Oliveira Rosado Fernandes
  - Maria Teresa de Sampaio e Melo de Vasconcelos, married to José Maria da Fonseca Caldeira Cabral (b. Lisbon, 1942)
- Maria Isabel Moreira de Vasconcelos (b. 3 November 1911), married to Pedro de Sárrea Mascarenhas Gaivão (b. 20 October 1907), without issue

Political offices
| Preceded by João Pinheiro Chagas | Prime Minister of Portugal (President of the Ministry); 1911–1912 | Succeeded by Duarte Leite |
