= Alzira Costa =

Wife of Portuguese politician (1875–1970)

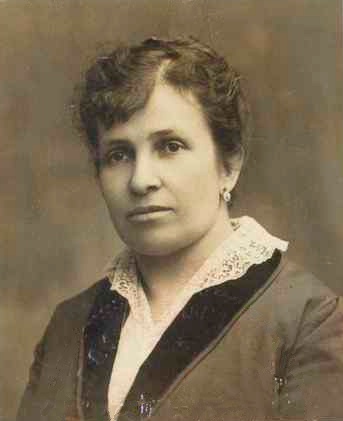
- Born: Alzira Coelho de Campos de Barros de Abreu; 20 April 1875; Oliveira do Hospital, Coimbra, Portugal
- Died: 21 February 1970 (aged 94); Nossa Senhora de Fátima, Lisbon, Portugal
- Known for: Spouse of the Prime Minister of Portugal (1913―1914, 1915―1915 and 1917)
- Spouse: Afonso Costa (m. 1892; died 1937)

Alzira de Barros de Abreu Costa (20 April 1875 – 21 February 1970) was the wife of Portuguese politician Afonso Costa.

== Biography ==
Alzira de Barros de Abreu was born in 1875, in Oliveira do Hospital, in Coimbra, the daughter of Albano Mendes de Abreu, a medical doctor, and his wife, Emília de Barros Coelho de Campos. She was the sister of the writer and politician José de Barros Mendes de Abreu, who was born on 20 July 1878.

She was also the sister of António de Barros Mendes de Abreu (1880–1960), a lawyer, and the aunt of the dancer and choreographer Margarida de Abreu (1915–2006) and Maria Helena von Hoffmann de Abreu (1920–2020), a piano teacher and a pioneer of yoga in Portugal, who married João de Freitas Branco, the son of the composer Luís de Freitas Branco.

She married Afonso Costa in the New Cathedral of Coimbra, on 15 September 1892. In 1916, she was one of the founders of the Portuguese Women's Crusade.

She died at the age of 94, in Nossa Senhora de Fátima, Lisbon.
