= Manuel de Arriaga =

President of Portugal from 1911 to 1915

His Excellency Manuel de Arriaga
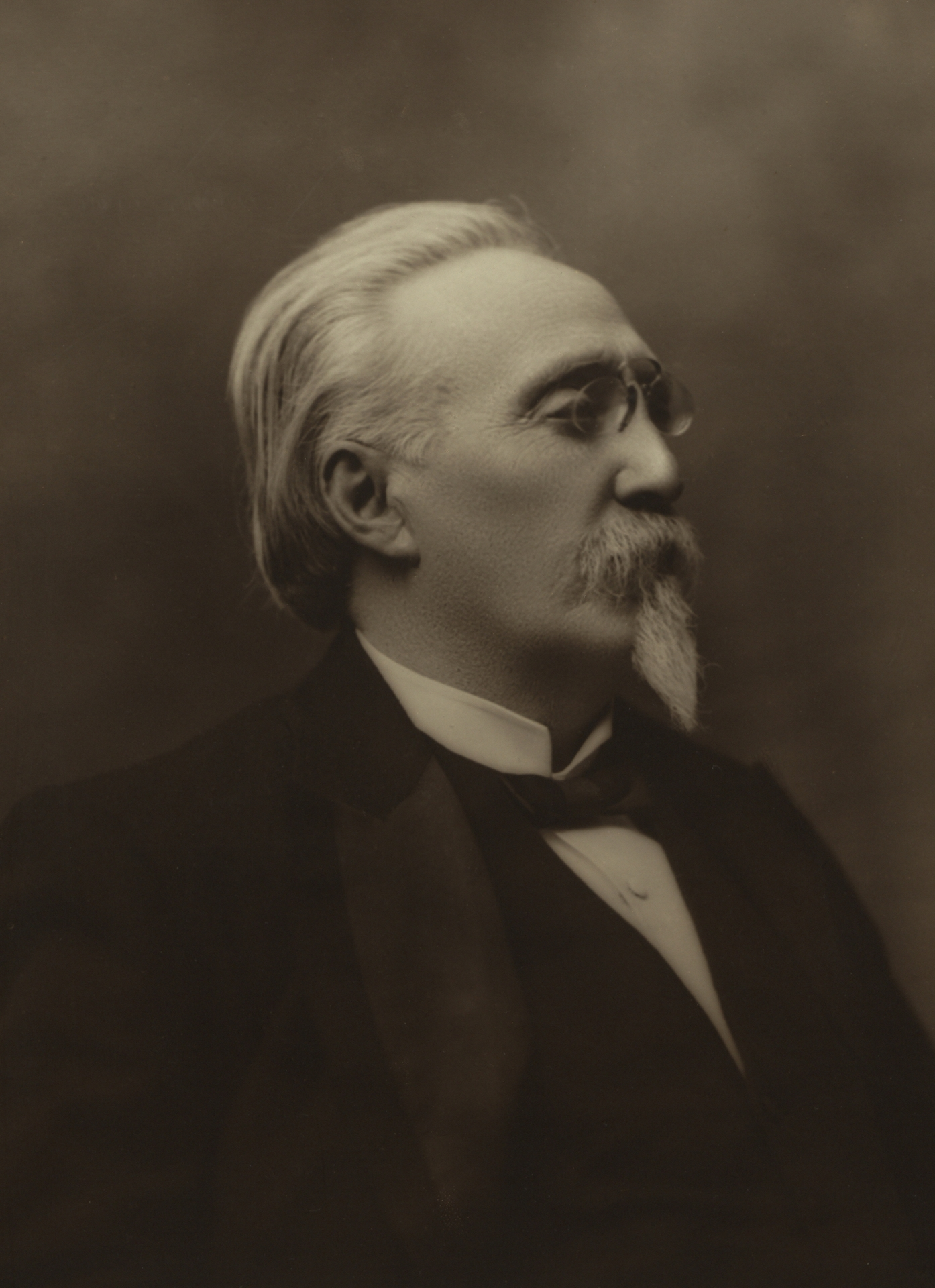
- Official portrait, 1912

President of Portugal
- In office 24 August 1911 – 29 May 1915
- Prime Minister: Provisional Government; João Chagas; Augusto de Vasconcelos; Duarte Leite; Afonso Costa; Bernardino Machado; Vítor Hugo de Azevedo Coutinho; Joaquim Pimenta de Castro; Constitutional Junta; José de Castro
- Preceded by: Provisional Government
- Succeeded by: Teófilo Braga

Attorney General of the Republic
- In office 17 November 1910 – 24 August 1911
- Appointed by: Provisional Government
- Preceded by: António Cândido
- Succeeded by: José Azevedo e Silva

Personal details
- Born: 8 July 1840 Horta, Azores, Portugal
- Died: 5 March 1917 (aged 76) Lisbon, Portugal
- Party: Portuguese Republican (later Democratic)
- Spouse: Lucrécia Furtado de Melo
- Children: 6
- Education: University of Coimbra
- Occupation: Lawyer; Professor of Law; Lecturer of English

Manuel José de Arriaga Brum da Silveira e Peyrelongue (8 July 1840 – 5 March 1917) was a Portuguese lawyer who served as the first president of Portugal from 1911 to 1915. Manuel de Arriaga also served as the first attorney-general, following the deposition of King Manuel II in 1910, and a Republican Provisional Government headed by Teófilo Braga (Note: Who would succeed him in the post following his resignation) he became president of the First Portuguese Republic.

== Biography ==
Of his early life details are brief: Arriaga was born to an aristocratic family; son of Sebastião José de Arriaga Brum da Silveira (c. 1810 – Setúbal, 18 October 1881) and his wife, whom he married on 24 December 1834, Maria Cristina Pardal Ramos Caldeira (c. 1815 – ?). Arriaga's father was a rich merchant in the city, only son, and property-owner, whose heritage traced his lineage to the Fleming Joss van Aard, one of the original settlers of the island of Faial (of the male line to a Basque family of small nobility) and whose second cousin was Bernardo de Sá Nogueira de Figueiredo, 1st Marquess of Sá da Bandeira. The young Manuel was also the grandson of General Sebastião José de Arriaga Brum da Silveira, who distinguished himself in the Peninsular Wars, and grand-nephew of the Judge of the Supreme Court, who between 1821 and 1822 was also a representative for the Azores in the Constituent Courts.

The Arriaga family included six children, of these the following siblings: Maria Cristina, the oldest (a poet, referred by Vitorino Nemésio in his masterpiece Mau Tempo no Canal); José de Arriaga, a historian (known for História da Revolução Portuguesa de 1820, published in 1889 and Os Últimos 60 anos da Monarquia, published in 1911); Sebastião Arriaga Brum da Silveira Júnior, agricultural engineer (after studying abroad, he worked on land recuperation projects in the Alentejo); and Manuel, the fourth in line of succession (who decided early on to concentrate on politics).

=== Education ===
Arriaga had his primary education in his native city of Horta. Around the age of 18, he moved with his younger brother (José de Arriaga) to Coimbra to study at the University of Coimbra in the Faculty of Law (from 1860 to 1865), where he distinguished himself for his brilliant mind and notable oratory. During this time he adhered to philosophical positivism and republican democracy, where he frequently joined others is discussions on philosophy and politics, showing a capacity for argument and imagination. His republican idealism, considered subversive, caused a rift between him and his conservative monarchist-leaning father (a supporter of the traditionalist King D. Miguel); his father would break-off ties with his sons (for those subverse ideals), forcing the older Manuel to work as a private teacher to support his and his brother's studies.

After finishing his studies in 1865, Manuel worked as a lawyer in Lisbon, but, desiring to be a teacher, he competed for the 10th chair at the Escola Politécnica (Polytechnical school) in 1866, as well as the chair in History in the department of Letters. Unsuccessful, in 1875 he ended up working in Lisbon both as an English teacher at the local secondary school, and as a lawyer.

Later, he established a legal practice, and quickly developed a clientele, which permitted him the financial security to assist his brother in completing his studies. Between many of the causes he defended while a lawyer, in 1890, he was the advocate for António José de Almeida, after he wrote "Bragança, o último" an article against King D. Carlos in the academic journal O Ultimatum.

On 26 August 1876, he joined the Comissão para a Reforma da Instrução Secundária ("Commission on the Reform on Secondary School Instruction").

=== Politics ===
A member of the Portuguese Republican Party (before the 31 January 1891 revolt), alongside Jacinto Nunes, Azevedo e Silva, Bernardino Pinheiro, Teófilo Braga and Francisco Homem Cristo, he was an active parliamentarian during the constitutional monarchy of King Luís I; he was involved in the debates on the reform of education, the penal code and prisons, in addition to electoral reform. By this time doctrinaire republicans had, by that time, been replaced by others in the party affiliated with masonry or the nascente Carbonari associations. He was also elected deputy for Funchal (1883–84) in the minority Republican government and later Lisbon (1890–92). A pragmatist, he actively promoted the Republican cause, while maintaining good relations with the Roman Catholic Church, unlike some of his contemporaries in the Republican movement. But, at the same time, he was combative and critical of what he saw as the "lethargy of monarchical governments, the [general] wastes and luxuries of the royal family. Yet, he ardently denounced irregularities in his own government, especially when some Ministers transferred funds from the government coffers into private hands.

Following the establishment of the Republic (5 October 1910), young Republican students in Coimbra entered the installations of the Senate, and vandalized the Hall and furniture used in Doctoral ceremonies and damaged paintings of the last Portuguese kings. In order "to impede other depravities Dr. António José de Almeida (Republican from the first hour) invited Dr. Manuel de Arriaga to be rector of the old University and gave him leave on 17 October of 1910 in a ceremony without academic ceremonies, which was enough to curb student enthusiasm".

During the period of the Provisional Government, he became the Attorney-General of the Republic premièring in that way as a paladin of Republican propaganda and as one of the more caustic Portuguese.

As one of the older figures of the Republican regime (he was 71), he was elected president on 24 August 1911; he did not campaign for the position, and noted that it was a heavy burden, which he believed he was personally incapable of fulfilling its duties, but accepted it "for the good of the Republic". The other candidate was Dr. Bernardino Machado (who would also become President later), but it was António José de Almeida who had suggested Manuel de Arriaga at the end of Teófilo Braga's Provisional Government. As Almeida had believed Arriaga "was one of the few if not the only man in the Party who worked well with everyone and whom the Lord Christ didn't speak ill of".

The Presidency was itself not an enviable or prestigious position; though, for a time, the elected individual occupied a large home at Horta Seca, they were required to furnish the home at their own cost, pay rent, and had no transport budget, nor a personal secretary (Arriaga would ask his own son to assist him in this role). Later, the first President lived in the Palace of Belém, but not in the main building, but rather in an annex off the Pátio das Damas. This occurred in a period when personal divisions between different factions had splintered the Republican cause; António José de Almeida would form the Evolutionist Party, Brito Camacho the Republican Union, while Afonso Costa would continue to front the main Republican Party (renamed the Democratic Party). Manuel de Arriaga, for his part, would select the politician and journalist João Chagas to head his first government. In his personal autobiography, Arriaga recounted how he hoped that he would not be another factor to divide Republicans, especially in a time where there existed a need to work together; it was a difficult period historically, due to the exasperation of the "religious question", constant social agitation and political party instability (associated with "Machiavellian strategies" of some politicians) that fermented during the infancy of the First Republic. Frequently, Arriaga was unable to contain these tensions and often had to deal with counter-revolutionary revolts, such as the Royalist attack on Chaves led by Captain Paiva Couceiro. During his mandate, several governments fell; there were eight changes in the Prime Minister's office, disorder in the streets, violent reactions against the church, as well as counter-revolutionary monarchist movements. Finally, he invited Dr. António José de Almeida to lead the government, but he refused, and opted for the Republican Afonso Costa, who would govern off-and-on until 1917. Hated, but feared, he governed and even sought to restore some order and economy to the public accounts. Although Afonso Costa was able to reduce the deficit, the instability and conflict between Parties persisted, made more critical by internal politics and growing international tensions in 1914 (that would eventually begin World War I).

Arriaga deplored the circumstances, going so far as to announcing his intent to resign unless a coalition or non-party government could be installed that resolved the outstanding issues of amnesty and separation of church and state. But, subsequent governments would not resolve the issue immediately; on 22 February 1914 an amnesty was conceded for those not accused of violent actions, and eleven leaders of subversive groups were released, but the Law of Separation remained unrevised.

=== Revolt to resignation ===
Continuing political intrigues inevitably forced the first Republic down the path towards dictatorship. At the onset of the First World War, there was also pressure from the Portuguese colonies in Africa, principally Angola and Mozambique and the National Assembly had decided, while remaining initially neutral in the conflict, to send troops to those colonies which fronted German possessions.

The new Republic was now increasingly unmanageable, and further, there were divergences developing between the government and the army. At one point, a military contingent in Oporto attempted a coup d'état in Lisbon, which was suppressed. The government suggested disbanding the regiments involved, but their leaders appealed to General Pimenta de Castro. In an attempt to mitigate these problems, Manuel de Arriaga wrote to the three party leaders (Camacho, Afonso Costa and António José de Almeida) in order to come to an accord and form a unity government, but Afonso Costa did not react well to the proposal. The President then withdrew his support for the government, then-presided by Vítor Hugo de Azevedo, and to calm the Army called on General Joaquim Pimenta de Castro (who had been the Minister of War under João Chagas) to form a government. Arriaga had known and placed his confidence in Castro. But, Joaquim Pereira Pimenta de Castro selected for his ministers, seven military officers, who did not permit the re-opening of Parliament, and provided an amnesty for convicted monarchists involved in the Attack on Chaves He made changes to electoral law and began governing as a dictator, which was only supported by the Evolutionist Party (Portugal) and the group led by Machado dos Santos on the political right of the Republicans.

What had started as an attempt to eliminate an inevitable conflict between the armed forces and the political class, eventually resulted in a bloody conflict. The parliamentarians, meeting secretly on 4 May 1915 in the Palácio da Mitra, declared Arriaga and Pimenta de Castro outside the law, their acts undemocratic and essentially void. Then, on 14 May, in a revolt instigated by members of the Democratic Party, elements of civil reactionary groups and supported by elements of the Navy began what was essentially a civil war; there were many deaths and injuries on both sides. The well-intentioned and pacifist Arriaga had only one option; twelve days following the start of the uprising, he resigned from the Presidency. In his resignation letter, he stated that the deaths during the revolt were needless, that Pimenta de Castro's regime was less a dictatorship then earlier governments and that 1914–15 laws had given future governments unusual war powers.

He paid heavily for his political naivety; as the author Raul Brandão noted the man, "although profoundly altruistic and magnanimous, good-natured and honorable", had rapidly turned into a political criminal and accused of duplicity with the dictatorial and violent Pimenta de Castro. In his resignation (to his ministers and Party) he defended himself against these unjust accusations and declared his well-intentioned loyalty to the Republican cause, which he had supported throughout his life (but which had abandoned him disillusioned). The parliamentarian, writer and journalist, Augusto de Castro later recounted a conversation with the former President, shortly before his death (in 1917):

"The man, an admirable magistrate, with an aristocratic comportment and a romantic look, who once was one of the most handsome boys of his time, had transformed himself, in half-a-dozen months, into an old, curved and pathetic man...Arriaga recounted to me one of his unique pleasures during his exile...his flowers, garden and poetry...in that afternoon, seated in his garden, seated in the warmth of the sun's rays, I told the old man my predictions. That politics was not made for idealists nor poets, like him...Arriaga listened silently, forcing a smile respectively. Eventually, tears covered his eyes...And while making small patterns in the carpet with his cane, he told me, with an irony...'I am a political criminal, my friend'...I wanted to comfort him, and remembered his sense of pride in popular sentiment and justice, that yet remained in his soul...the people that you had esteemed, continue to respect and love you. That much is true. There are few in the theater, in public, who caricature you..."

But Augusto de Castro ended his story by noting that upon leaving the ex-President's home he purchased a newspaper that referred to Arriaga as a renegade and traitor, and thought, "never, like that afternoon, did politics seem so cruel and a sinister thing".

Manuel de Arriaga was replaced as president by Professor Teófilo Braga in 1915, who had led the provisional government following the abdication and exile of King Manuel II.

=== Later life ===
In 1874, Arriaga had married Lucrécia Augusta de Brito de Berredo Furtado de Melo (Foz do Douro, Porto, 13 November 1844 – Parede, Oeiras, 14 October 1927), from a family friendly to the Arriagas (from the island of Pico). The ceremony occurred in a chapel near Valença do Minho, where her father was General and Governor. For a few years the couple lived in Coimbra, where Manuel de Arriaga flourished in his law practice. Six children were born, two boys and four girls, and the family regularly spent their holidays in Buarcos.

Following his resignation, Manuel de Arriaga died in Lisbon two years later on 5 March 1917. His home, near Rua da Janelas Verdes, overlooked the boats in the Tejo, and in the room where he died there were photographs of the two men he most admired, Victor Hugo and Alexandre Herculano, while above his bed, an image of Christ. In the end, former-President Arriaga's image was rehabilitated by the Portuguese media for his "intelligence, patriotism, benevolence and his honor for the manner in which he exercised his functions". This was further enhanced by his public papers and documents, as well as the work of several intellectuals.

Arriaga was buried in the Prazeres Cemetery the day after his death. In 2004, by decision of the Assembly of the Republic, his body was moved to the National Pantheon.

== Published works ==
Although a distinguished lawyer and orator, most of Arraiga's works were presented to the public, but also included published:

- O Partido Republicano e o Congresso (The Republican Party and the Congress), presented at the Clube Henriques Nogueira (11 December 1887);
- A Questão da Lunda (A Question of Lunda), represented in the Chamber of Deputies (1891);
- Descaracterização da Nacionalidade Portuguesa no regime monárquico (The De-characterization of Portuguese Nationality in the Monarchical Regime) presented in the Chamber of Deputies (1897);
- Começo de liquidação final (Beginning the Final Liquidation)
- Sobre a Unidade da Família Humana debaixo do Ponto de Vista Económico (About the Unity of the Human Family under the Economic View)
- A irresponsabilidade do poder executivo no regime monárquico liberal (The Irresponsibility of Executive Power in the Liberal Monarchical Regime)
- Contos Sagrados (Sacred Stories)
- Irradiações (Diffusion)
- Harmonia Social (Social Harmony)

== Notes ==
| Preceded by Teófilo Braga (President of the Provisional Government) | President of Portugal; 1911–1915 | Succeeded by Teófilo Braga |
