= Joaquim Pimenta de Castro =

Portuguese politician (1846–1918)

Count Joaquim Pimenta de Castro
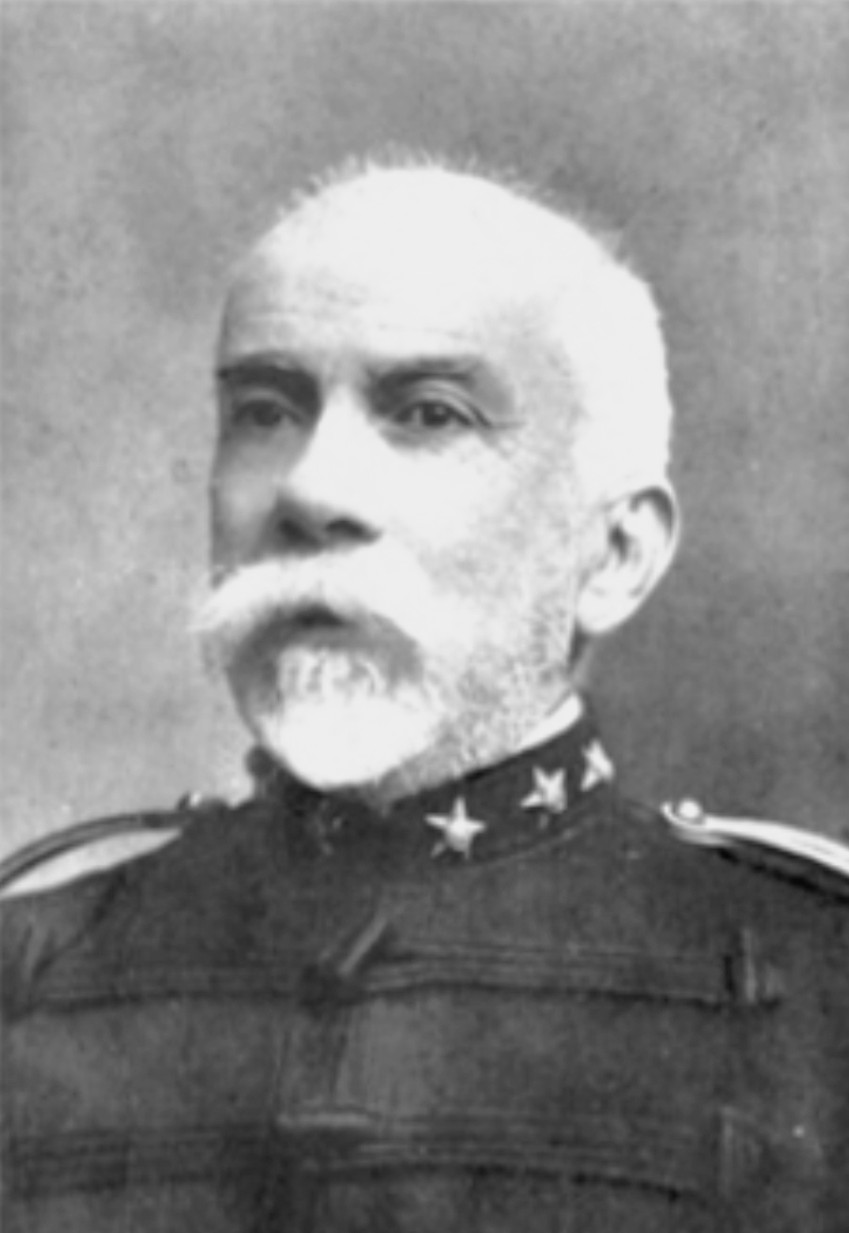

Prime Minister of Portugal
- In office 25 January – 14 May 1915
- President: Manuel de Arriaga
- Preceded by: Vítor Hugo de Azevedo Coutinho
- Succeeded by: Constitutional Junta; João Chagas (designate)

Minister of War of Porrtugal
- In office 4 September – 8 October 1911
- President: Manuel de Arriaga
- Prime Minister: João Chagas
- Preceded by: António Xavier Correia Barreto
- Succeeded by: Alberto da Silveira
- In office 25 January – 14 May 1915
- President: Manuel de Arriaga
- Prime Minister: Himself
- Preceded by: Joaquim Cerveira de Albuquerque
- Succeeded by: Constitutional Junta; Basílio Teles (designate)

Minister of the Interior of Portugal (Note: Government of the Military Dictatorship of Joaquín Pimenta de Castro)
- Interim; 25 January – 28 January 1915
- President: Manuel de Arriaga
- Prime Minister: Himself
- Preceded by: Alexandre Braga, Jr.
- Succeeded by: Pedro Gomes Teixeira

Minister of Justice of Portugal
- Interim; 25 January – 28 January 1915
- President: Manuel de Arriaga
- Prime Minister: Himself
- Preceded by: José Maria Barbosa de Magalhães
- Succeeded by: Guilherme Moreira

Minister of Finance of Portugal
- Interim; 25 January – 28 January 1915
- President: Manuel de Arriaga
- Prime Minister: Himself
- Preceded by: António dos Santos Lucas
- Succeeded by: Herculano Galhardo

Minister of the Navy of Portugal
- Interim; 25 January – 28 January 1915
- President: Manuel de Arriaga
- Prime Minister: Himself
- Preceded by: Victor Hugo de Azevedo Coutinho
- Succeeded by: José Xavier de Brito

Minister of Foreign Affairs of Portugal
- Interim; 25 January – 4 February 1915
- President: Manuel de Arriaga
- Prime Minister: Himself
- Preceded by: Augusto Vieira Soares
- Succeeded by: José Jerónimo Rodrigues Monteiro

Minister of Public Works of Portugal
- Interim; 25 January – 28 January 1915
- President: Manuel de Arriaga
- Prime Minister: Himself
- Preceded by: Eduardo Alberto de Lima Basto
- Succeeded by: José Nunes da Ponte

Minister of the Colonies of Portugal
- Interim; 25 January – 28 January 1915
- President: Manuel de Arriaga
- Prime Minister: Himself
- Preceded by: Alfredo Rodrigues Gaspar
- Succeeded by: Teófilo da Trindade

Minister of Public Instruction of Portugal
- Interim; 25 January – 28 January 1915
- President: Manuel de Arriaga
- Prime Minister: Himself
- Preceded by: Frederico Ferreira de Simas
- Succeeded by: Manuel Goulart de Medeiros

Personal details
- Born: Joaquim Pereira Pimenta de Castro Júnior; 5 November 1846 Monção, Portugal
- Died: 14 May 1918 (aged 71) Lisbon, Portugal
- Party: Independent
- Spouse: Emília de Freitas
- Parent(s): Joaquim Pereira Pimenta de Castro (father); Joana Cleofa Pereira de Castro Sousa Morim (mother)
- Education: University of Coimbra
- Occupation: Army officer (General), and mathematician

Military service
- Allegiance: Kingdom of Portugal; First Portuguese Republic
- Branch/service: (Kingdom of Portugal) (Portugal) Portuguese Army
- Years of service: 1867–1918
- Rank: General
- Battles/wars: 5 October 1910 revolution Movimento das Espadas; May 14 Revolt

Joaquim Pereira Pimenta de Castro (5 November 1846, in Pias, Monção – 14 May 1918, in Lisbon; Portuguese pronunciation: [ʒuɐˈkĩ piˈmẽtɐ ðɨ ˈkaʃtɾu]) was a Portuguese army officer and politician. He was a career military officer reaching the position of General, also graduated in mathematics by the University of Coimbra. In 1908, he was nominated commander of the 3rd Military Region, in Porto. After the proclamation of the Republic on 5 October 1910, he was Minister of War, for only two months, in 1911. He had to resign due to the monarchist incursion of Henrique de Paiva Couceiro. An independent, he was chosen by President Manuel de Arriaga to be the President of the Ministry (Prime Minister) of a government, who would rule without the parliament, where the Portuguese Republican Party, led by Afonso Costa had the majority. His government, with the support of the moderate Evolutionist Party and the Republican Union, and also conservative military factions, was in office from 25 January to 14 May 1915. It was overthrown by the military movement of 14 May 1915, supported by the Republican Party, which also caused the resignation of President Manuel de Arriaga.

== Notes ==
Political offices
Preceded by Victor Hugo de Azevedo Coutinho	Prime Minister of Portugal (President of the Ministry); 1915	Succeeded by Constitutional Junta: José Norton de Matos; António Maria da Silva; José de Freitas Ribeiro; Alfredo de Sá Cardoso; Álvaro Xavier de Castro
