= João Pinheiro Chagas =

Portuguese journalist and politician

João Chagas
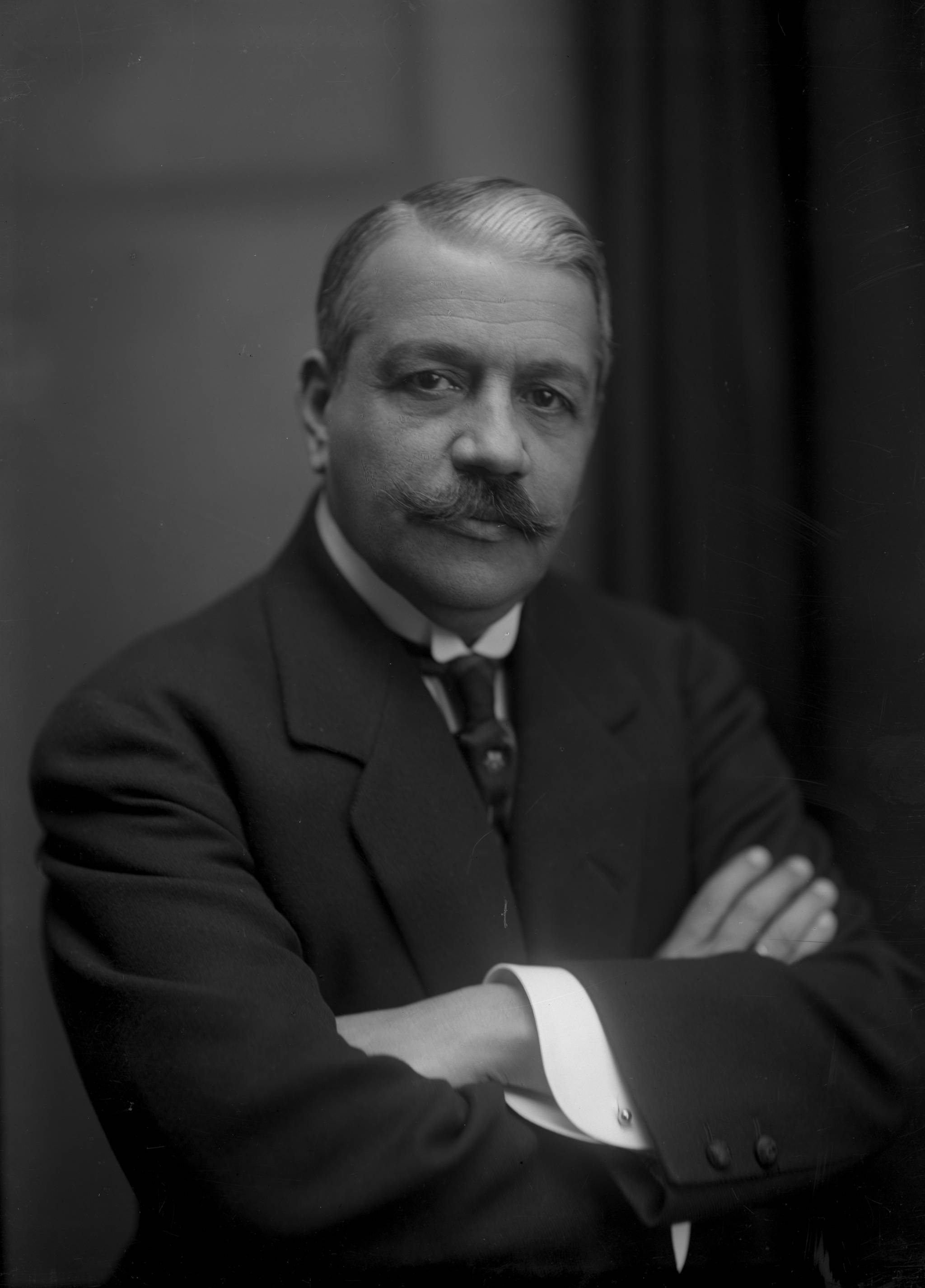

Prime Minister of Portugal
- In office 3 September 1911 – 12 November 1911
- President: Manuel de Arriaga
- Preceded by: Provisional Government
- Succeeded by: Augusto de Vasconcelos

Ambassador of Portugal to France
- In office 25 April 1911 – 31 December 1923
- Nominated by: Provisional Government
- Preceded by: Tomás de Sousa Rosa
- Succeeded by: António Joaquim Ferreira da Fonseca

Minister of the Interior
- In office 3 September 1911 – 12 November 1911
- Prime Minister: Himself
- Preceded by: António José de Almeida
- Succeeded by: Silvestre Falcão

Minister of Foreign Affairs
- In office 3 September 1911 – 12 October 1911
- Prime Minister: Himself
- Preceded by: Bernardino Machado
- Succeeded by: Augusto de Vasconcelos

Personal details
- Born: 1 September 1863 Rio de Janeiro, Empire of Brazil
- Died: 28 May 1925 (aged 61) Estoril, Portugal
- Party: Portuguese Republican (1890–1911); Independent (1911–1925)
- Occupation: Diplomat, editor, journalist, political analist, politician, writer

João Pinheiro Chagas (1 September 1863 – 28 May 1925; Portuguese pronunciation: [ʒuˈɐ̃w piˈɲɐjɾu ˈʃaɣɐʃ]) was a Portuguese politician, literary critic, propagandist, editor, and journalist. He was heavily involved in several rebellions condemning the monarchy and disseminating materials via pamphlets and newspapers in support of the Portuguese Republican Party. He was among the leaders of the 5 October 1910 revolution and the Lisbon Regicide, and later served as Ambassador to Paris, and twice as interim prime minister of the Portuguese First Republic.

== Biography ==
=== Early years ===
Chagas was born 1 September 1863 in Rio de Janeiro, Empire of Brazil to João Pinheiro Chagas and Maria Amélia Rosa Pereira. His father was a Portuguese emigrant with ancestral ties to Portuguese refugees from Beiras who fled to Brazil during the Liberal Wars. On his paternal side, Manuel Pinheiro Chagas was his cousin and his son Mário was his first cousin once removed. His mother was an Indigenous American. The family relocated to Lisbon when Chagas was a child and he was orphaned at a young age.

=== Writing career ===
Chagas could not afford to attend university, so he moved to Porto at age 16 and began his writing career. At times, he wrote under the pseudonym João Rimanso or Ivan. His first publication was in O Primeiro de Janeiro in Porto; he later moved back to Lisbon to collaborate with Temps, Correio da Manhã, and O Diá.

At the end of the 19th century, Chagas founded La Marseillaise (1896–1898), O Berro (1896), Branco e Negro (1896–1898), A Paródia (1900–1907), and A República Portuguesa, and became director of Brazilian newspaper O Paiz (1898) and the Portuguese publications A Lanterna (1899) and Batalha (1900). While incarcerated in Angola, he headed the prison's newspaper (1896–1897). La Marseillaise closed in 1898 due to censorship laws and Chagas' known allegiance to the Republican Party. When he returned from exile, he founded A Portuguesa (1893), which he considered a revival of La Marseillaise.

All of the newspapers he founded, directed, and contributed to were anti-monarchy propaganda tools; his articles were extremely controversial and led to his arrest several times.

=== Political activism ===
During his early years in Porto, he met and befriended several members of Life's Vanquished. He became more critical and more deeply involved with the Republican Party as a result. In 1891, he published an article in A República Portuguesa that was controversial enough to get him arrested and jailed for 10 days. Within days, he participated in and helped plan a rebellion, and his sentence was increased to 4 years in prison or 6 years in exile. Chagas was originally bound for Luanda but was transferred to Moçâmedes after one day. He escaped within a few months and traveled to Paris before returning to Portugal in 1892, where he was arrested again. While in prison, he continued to petition against governmental oppression of rights and wrote extensively about his experiences, making him the only primary source from a Portuguese prisoner from that period.

He was freed from prison in 1893 due to an amnesty resulting from the 1890 British Ultimatum. He lived in Porto, Brazil, and Madrid for varying lengths of time before being arrested again in 1896, and again in 1908 for his involvement in the Lisbon Regicide. He participated in the 5 October 1910 revolution not long after.

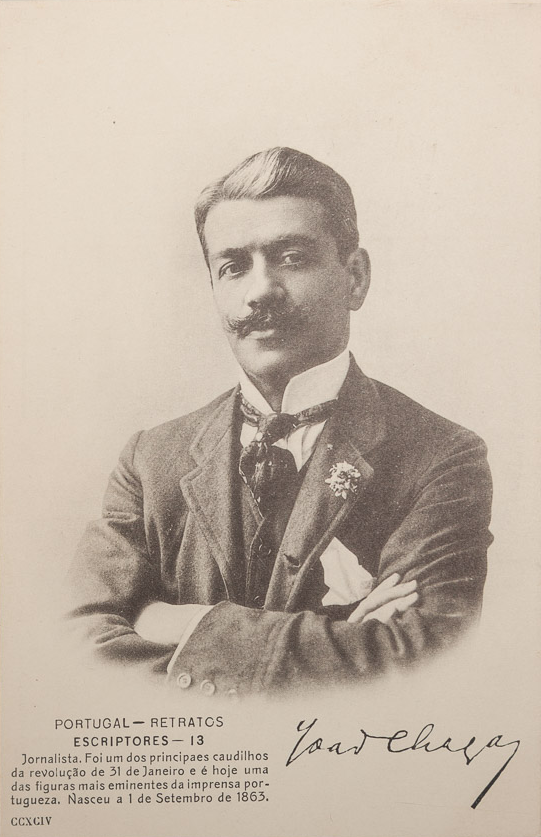
A 1900 postcard featuring Chagas

=== Political career ===
The Portuguese First Republic was established in 1910, and Chagas' governmental career began. His first role was an ambassador to Paris; he did, however, resign twice due to political disagreements with his supervisors. He served as both prime minister and Interior Minister for 70 days in late 1911 and again in 1915. While in Paris, he continued to keep a critical eye on Portugal's political decision-making. During the Republic's early days, Chagas met with Sir Lancelot Carnegie of Britain, Portuguese War Minister Freire de Andrade, and French diplomat Émile Daeschner to keep himself informed. He was very critical of Portugal's lack of involvement when World War I broke out and was one of the delegates who led the Republic to join the war in 1916.

=== Final years and death ===
Following the 1915 May 14 Revolt, Chagas was nominated to succeed Joaquim Pimenta de Castro role as prime minister of Portugal. Senator João José de Freitas disagreed with this decision and attempted to assassinated him. He shot several times at the passenger car Chagas was traveling in with his wife in Entroncamento. Chagas' head was shaved and he lost an eye in the attack. He withdrew from politics during his recovery and turned down the post, preferring instead to continue working as an ambassador in Paris. He kept this role until he retired in 1924, with the exception of 1917—1918 during the period of Sidónism. Chagas died on 28 May 1925 in Estoril, Cascais, Portugal.

He died of aortitis and is buried in the Alto de São João Cemetery.

== Honours ==
Chagas served as part of the Portuguese delegation at the Versailles Peace Conference and the League of Nations. He was also a co-founder of the Portuguese Association of Journalists and the Porto Men of Letters, and became a Freemason in 1896. In 1919, he was awarded a Gold Cross from the Military Order of Saint James of the Sword.

He is the namesake for a road in Lisbon and a garden in Porto.

== Bibliography ==
During his lifetime, Chagas wrote at least 15 books and many more journal articles and pamphlets:

Year	Original title	Title in English (Approx.)
1894	Diario de um condemnado politico	Diary of a Political Convict
1897	De Bond. Algunas aspectos da civilisaçaõ brasileira	Some aspects of Brazilian culture
1897	O crime da sociedade	Society's crime
1898	Na Brecha (Pamphletos)	The Gap (Pamphlets)
1900	Trabalhos forçado	Forced labour
1905	Bom-Humor	Good spirits
1905	Homens e Factos 1902—1904	Men and Facts 1902—1904
1906	As minhas razões	My reasons
1906	Posta-restante (Cartas a toda a genta)	Remaining notes (Letters to everyone)
1906	Vida Litteraria (ideias e sensacoes	Literary life: Ideas and sensations
1907	João Franco. 1906—1907	
1908	1908. Subsidios criticos para a historia da dictadura	1908. Critical subsidies for the history of the dictatorship
1908—1910	Cartas Politicas	Political notes
1915	A ultima crise. Comentários a situação da Republica Portuguesa	The last crisis: Comementary on the Portuguese Republic
1915	Portugal perante a Guerra. Subsidios para uma pagina da Historia Nacional	Portugal before the war. Subsidies for a page in National History

In 1929, four years after his death, Diario de João Chagas was published. He wrote the prefaces for Guedes d'Oliveira's 1890 Gazetilhas; and Luciano Fataça's 1895 A revolução de Cuba. He co-wrote Historia da revolta do Porto de 31 de Janeiro de 1891 (depoimento de dois cúmplices) with Ex-Tenente Coelho. He was also a translator; works included prose from Jacques Offenbach's operetta Os Bandidos and Adolphe d'Ennery's play Martyr.
