= List of prime ministers of Portugal by time in office =

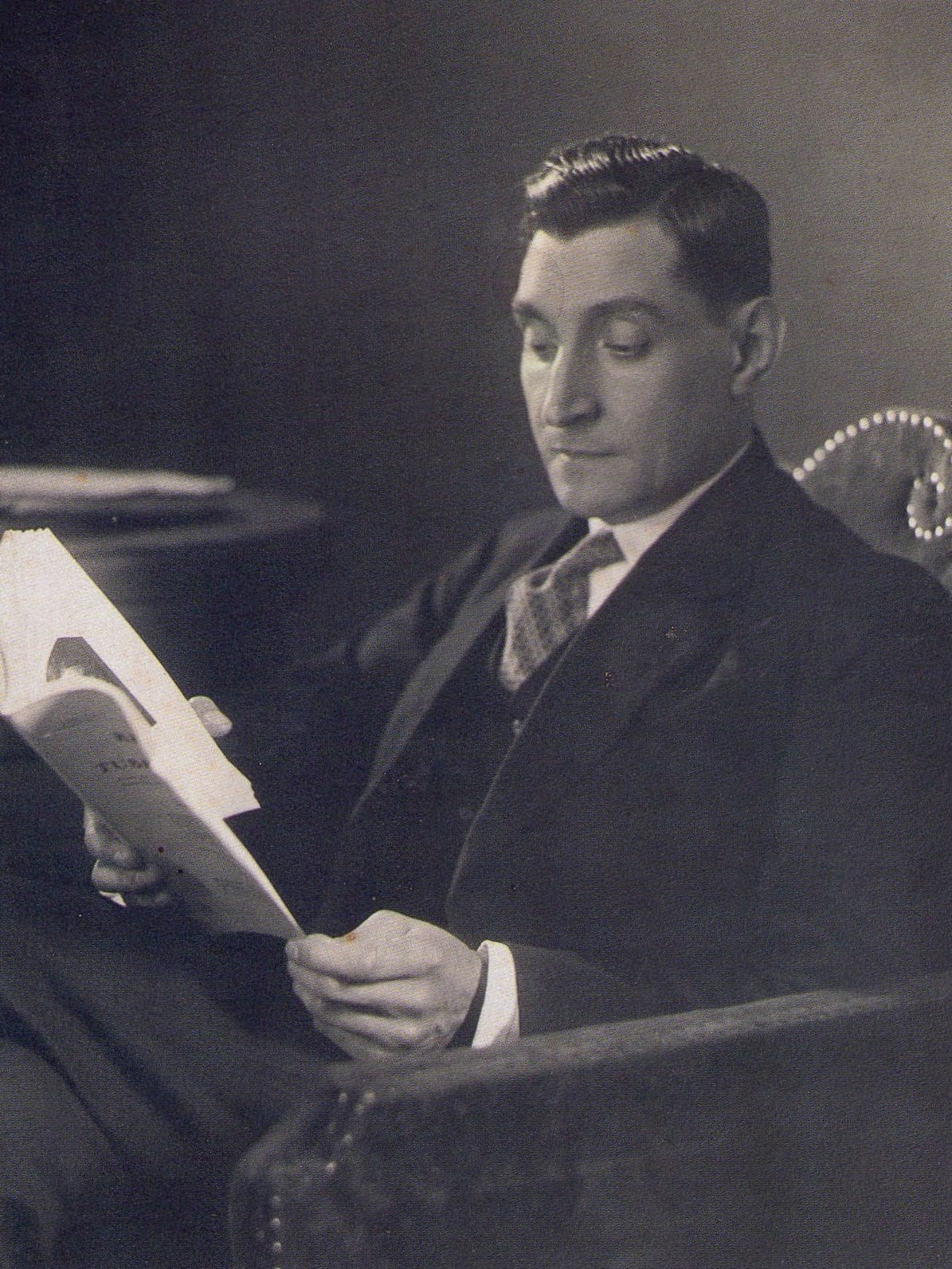
36 years, 82 days António de Oliveira Salazar from 1932 to 1968

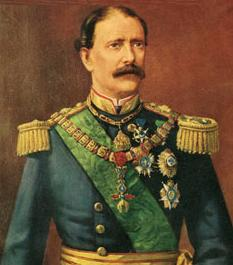
11 years, 26 days Fontes Pereira de Melo from 1871 to 1877, 1878 to 1879 and 1881 to 1886

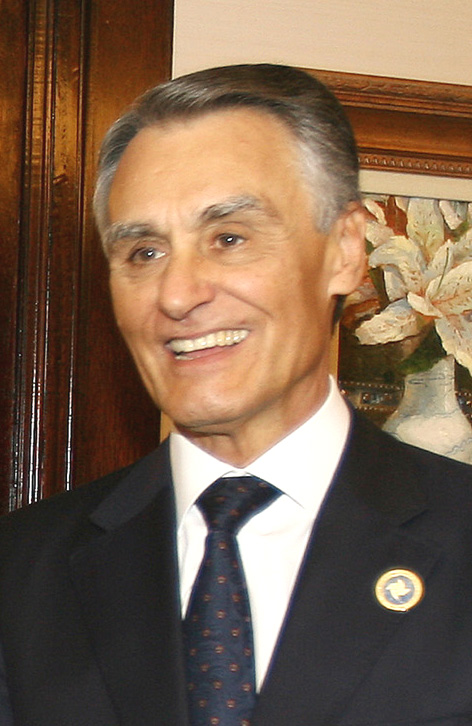
9 years, 356 days Aníbal Cavaco Silva from 1985 to 1995

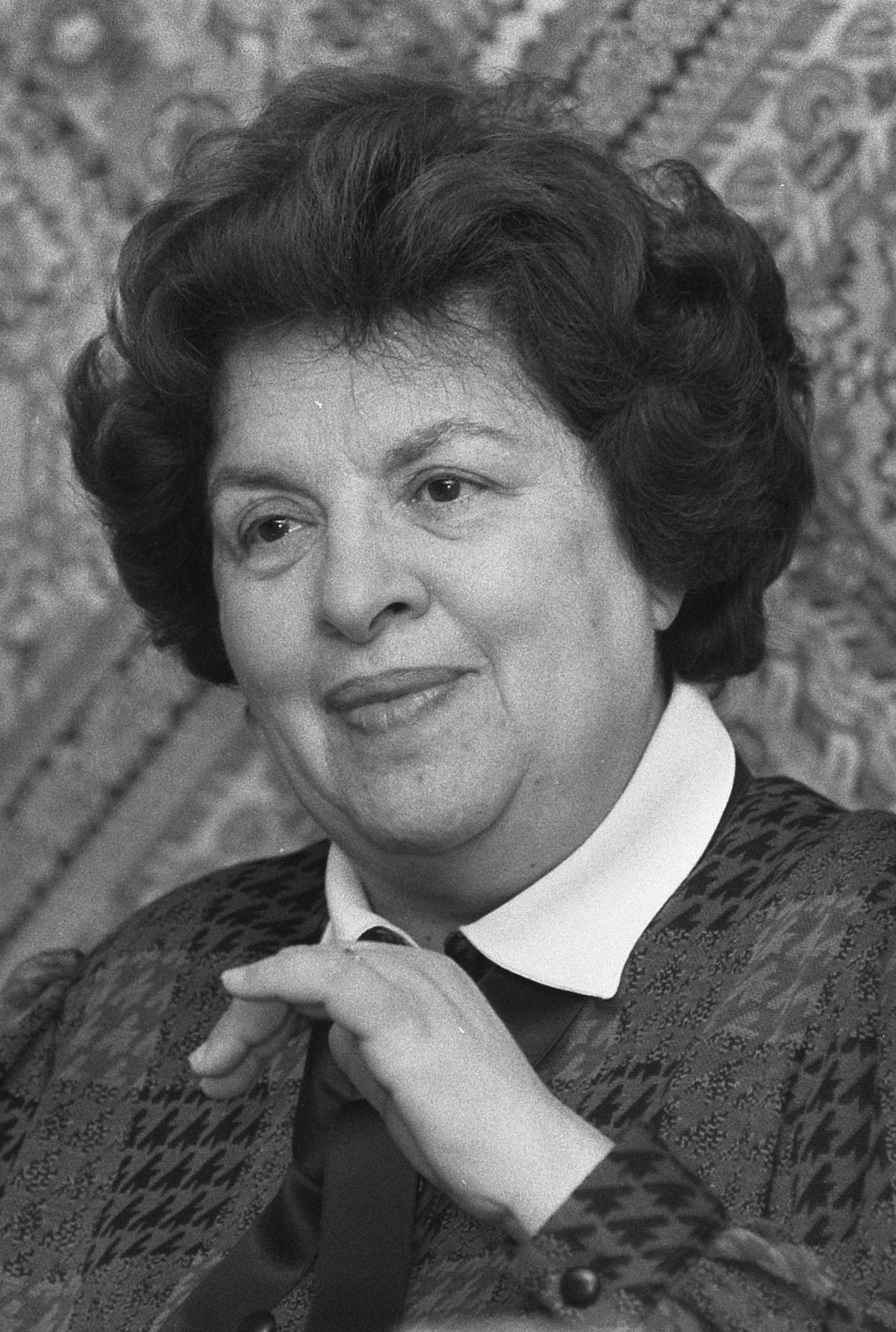
155 days Maria de Lourdes Pintasilgo from 1979 to 1980; the first and still only woman to hold the office of Prime Minister in Portuguese history.

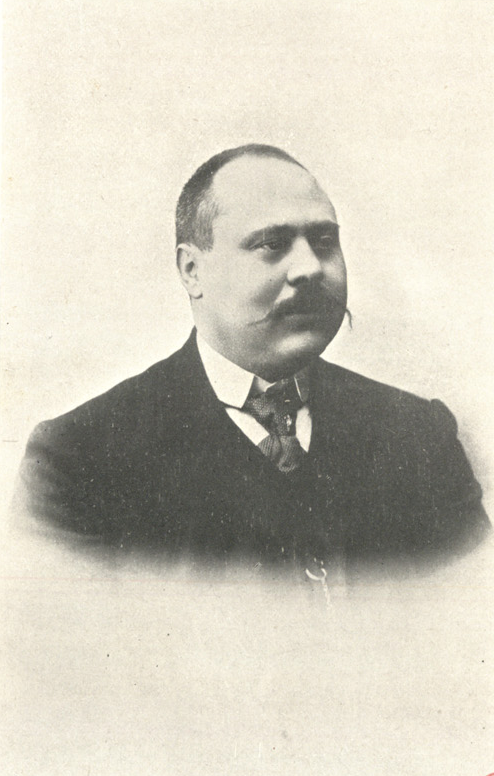
The shortest time in office was that of Francisco José Fernandes Costa, who was appointed Prime Minister on 15 January 1920 and resigned after having not taken office during the same day, due to protests.

This is a list of Portuguese prime ministers by time in office. The first "modern" Prime Minister was the Duke of Palmela, using the title of President of the Council of Ministers, who took office during the constitutional monarchy in 1834.

Of the 90 prime ministers, 8 have served more than eight years, while 55 have served less than one year.

António Oliveira Salazar is the longest serving prime minister in Portuguese history, with more than 36 years in office, although he ruled as a dictator. In more democratic systems, during the constitutional monarchy, Fontes Pereira de Melo served as prime minister for 11 years, although in three separate terms; while in the Third Republic, Aníbal Cavaco Silva held office for 10 years. During the turbulent First Portuguese Republic, António José de Almeida held office for just over one year, while Francisco Fernandes Costa didn't even serve as prime minister because he refused to take the oath of office.

== Rank by time in office ==
Rank	Prime Minister	Time in office	Cabinets	Party
1	António de Oliveira Salazar	36 years, 82 days	3	National Union
2	Fontes Pereira de Melo	11 years, 26 days	3	Regenerator
3	Aníbal Cavaco Silva	9 years, 356 days	3	Social Democratic
4	José Luciano de Castro	8 years, 288 days	3	Progressive
5	Duke of Saldanha	8 years, 203 days	4	Regenerator
6	Ernesto Hintze Ribeiro	8 years, 131 days	3	Regenerator
7	António Costa	8 years, 128 days	3	Socialist
8	Duke of Loulé	8 years, 123 days	3	Historic
9	António Guterres	6 years, 160 days	2	Socialist
10	José Sócrates	6 years, 101 days	2	Socialist
11	Duke of Terceira	5 years, 290 days	4	Regenerator
12	Marcello Caetano	5 years, 210 days	1	National Union
13	Mário Soares	4 years, 187 days	3	Socialist
14	Pedro Passos Coelho	4 years, 158 days	2	Social Democratic
15	Marquess of Sá da Bandeira	3 years, 310 days	5	Reformist
16	Joaquim António de Aguiar	3 years, 64 days	3	Regenerator
17	Luís Montenegro	2 years, 166 days (Incumbent)	2	Social Democratic
18	Domingos Oliveira	2 years, 166 days	1	National Union
19	Francisco Pinto Balsemão	2 years, 151 days	2	Social Democratic
20	António Maria da Silva	2 years, 132 days	4	Democratic
21	Duke of Ávila	2 years, 119 days	3	Reformist
22	José Manuel Durão Barroso	2 years, 102 days	1	Social Democratic
23	Afonso Costa	1 year, 329 days	3	Democratic
24	Costa Cabral, Marquess of Tomar	1 year, 312 days	2	Chartist
25	Anselmo José Braamcamp	1 year, 297 days	1	Progressive
26	António Óscar Carmona	1 year, 284 days	1	Independent
27	João Franco	1 year, 261 days	1	Liberal Regenerator
28	Count of Bonfim	1 year, 195 days	1	Septemberist
29	João Crisóstomo	1 year, 95 days	1	Independent
30	José Vicente de Freitas	1 year, 81 days	1	Independent
31	Vasco Gonçalves	1 year, 63 days	1	Independent
32	António José de Almeida	1 year, 40 days	1	Evolutionist
33	José Dias Ferreira	1 year, 35 days	1	Independent
34	Bernardino Machado	1 year, 23 days	2	Democratic
35	Sidónio Pais	1 year, 9 days	1	National Republican
36	Duke of Palmela	363 days	3	Chartist
37	Francisco Sá Carneiro	336 days	1	Social Democratic
38	Francisco Ferreira do Amaral	326 days	1	Independent
39	Teófilo Braga	323 days	1	Republican
40	Domingos Pereira	278 days	3	Democratic
40	José Pinheiro de Azevedo	278 days	1	Independent
41	António de Serpa Pimentel	270 days	1	Regenerator
42	Carlos Mota Pinto	252 days	1	Independent
43	Pedro Santana Lopes	238 days	1	Social Democratic
44	António Rodrigues Sampaio	236 days	1	Regenerator
45	Baron of Ribeira de Sabrosa	222 days	1	Septemberist
45	Venceslau de Lima	222 days	1	Independent
46	Augusto de Vasconcelos	216 days	1	Republican
47	Álvaro de Castro	212 days	1	Nationalist Republican
48	Duarte Leite	207 days	1	Republican
49	Alfredo de Sá Cardoso	205 days	1	Democratic
50	Artur Ivens Ferraz	197 days	1	Independent
51	José de Castro	196 days	1	Democratic
52	Francisco da Veiga Beirão	186 days	1	Regenerator
53	António Granjo	174 days	2	Republican Liberal
54	Maria de Lourdes Pintasilgo	155 days	1	Independent
55	José Jorge Loureiro	154 days	1	Independent
56	Alfredo Rodrigues Gaspar	138 days	1	Democratic
57	Vitorino Guimarães	136 days	1	Democratic
58	Artur de Campos Henriques	106 days	1	Independent
58	Joaquim Pimenta de Castro	106 days	1	Independent
59	António Teixeira de Sousa	101 days	1	Regenerator
60	Tomé de Barros Queirós	99 days	1	Republican Liberal
61	Liberato Pinto	92 days	1	Democratic
62	António Maria Baptista	90 days	1	Democratic
63	Alfredo Nobre da Costa	86 days	1	Independent
64	José Domingues dos Santos	85 days	1	Democratic Leftwing Republican
65	João Chagas	72 days	1	Republican
66	Adelino da Palma Carlos	63 days	1	Independent
67	António Dias de Oliveira	62 days	1	Septemberist
67	José Relvas	62 days	1	Independent
68	Count of Lumiares	55 days	1	Septemberist
69	Francisco Cunha Leal	53 days	1	Democratic
70	Vítor Hugo de Azevedo Coutinho	47 days	1	Democratic
71	Carlos Maia Pinto	41 days	1	Independent
72	Diogo Freitas do Amaral	36 days	1	Democratic and Social Centre
73	João Tamagnini Barbosa	35 days	1	National Republican
74	Sebastião Sousa Teles	33 days	1	Independent
74	António Ginestal Machado	33 days	1	Nationalist Republican
75	Vasco de Almeida e Costa	30 days	1	Independent
76	Count of Linhares	23 days	1	Chamorro
77	National Salvation Junta	21 days	1	Independent
78	José Ramos Preto	20 days	1	Democratic
78	José Mendes Cabeçadas	20 days	1	Independent
78	Manuel Gomes da Costa	20 days	1	Independent
79	Manuel Maria Coelho	17 days	1	Independent
80	João do Canto e Castro	9 days	1	National Republican
81	Marquess of Valença	1 day	1	Independent
81	Constitutional Junta	1 day	1	Independent
82	Francisco Fernandes Costa	less than a day	–	Republican Liberal

=== By party ===
Rank	Party	Time in office	Prime ministers
1	National Union	44 years, 93 days	3
2	Regenerator	38 years, 176 days	9
3	Socialist	25 years, 211 days	4
4	Social Democratic	23 years, 46 days (Incumbent)	7
5	Independent	12 years, 194 days	26
6	Progressist	10 years, 220 days	2
7	Democratic	8 years, 279 days	13
8	Historic	8 years, 123 days	1
9	Reformist	6 years, 64 days	2
10	Chartist	2 years, 310 days	2
11	Septemberist	2 years, 169 days	4
12	Republican	2 years, 88 days	4
13	Liberal Regenerator	1 year, 261 days	1
14	Evolutionist	1 year, 40 days	1
15	National Republican	1 year, 53 days	3
16	Republican Liberal	273 days	3
17	Nationalist Republican	245 days	2
18	Democratic Leftwing Republican	85 days	1
19	Democratic and Social Centre	36 days	1
20	Chamorro	23 days	1

== See also ==
- List of prime ministers of Portugal
- List of presidents of Portugal
- Prime Minister of Portugal
