= José Norton de Matos =

Portuguese general and politician

General José Norton de Matos
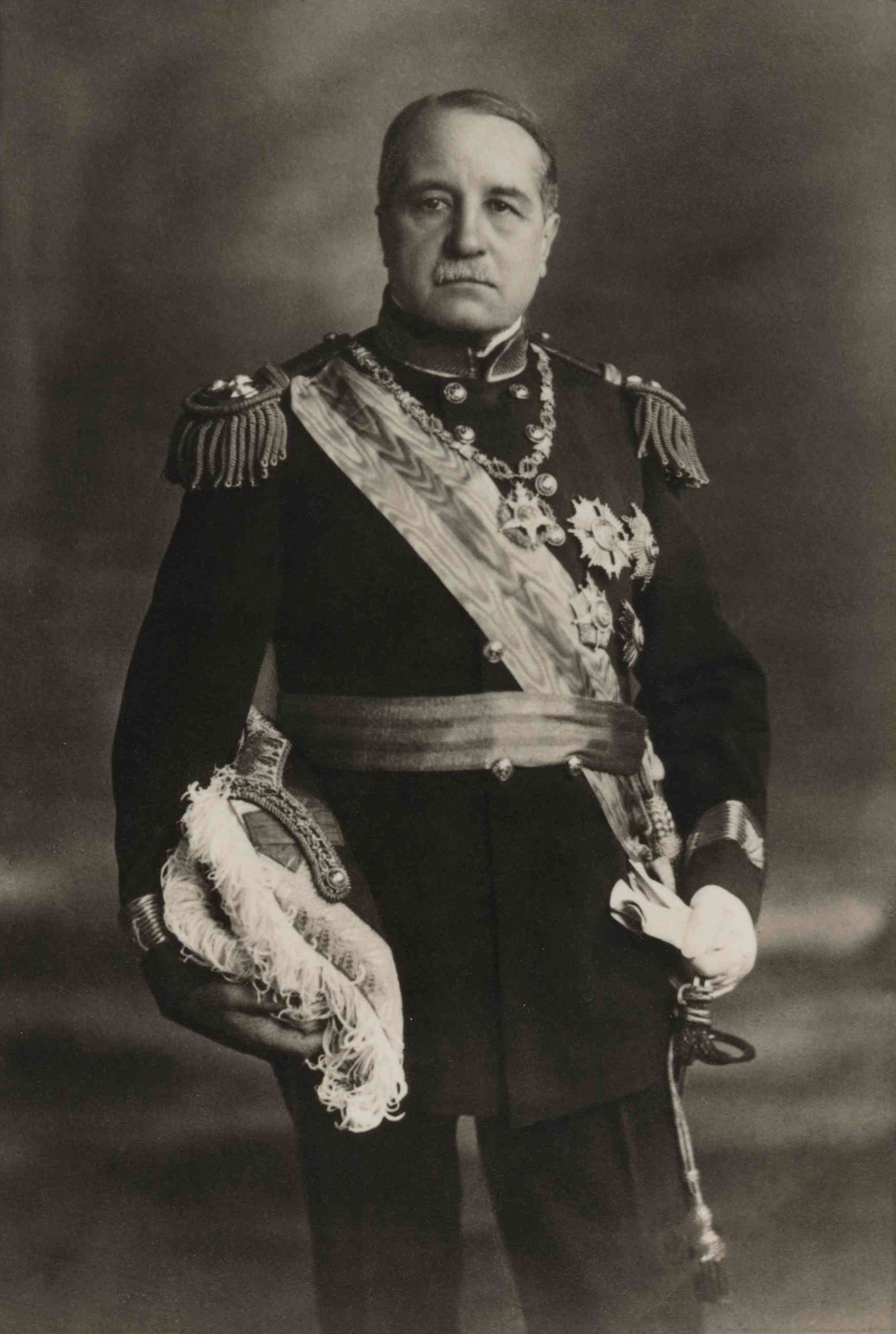

Prime Minister of Portugal
- Interim
- In office 7 October – 25 October 1917
- President: Bernardino Machado
- Preceded by: Afonso Costa
- Succeeded by: Afonso Costa
- Interim
- In office 17 November – 8 December 1917
- President: Bernardino Machado; Sidónio Pais
- Preceded by: Afonso Costa
- Succeeded by: Sidónio Pais

Ambassador of Portugal to the United Kingdom
- In office 1 July 1924 – 9 July 1926
- President: Manuel Teixeira Gomes; Bernardino Machado; José Mendes Cabeçadas
- Prime Minister: Álvaro de Castro; Alfredo Rodrigues Gaspar; José Domingues dos Santos; Vitorino Guimarães; António Maria da Silva; Domingos Leite Pereira; António Maria da Silva; José Mendes Cabeçadas; Manuel Gomes da Costa
- Minister of Foreign Affairs: Domingos Leite Pereira; Vitorino Henriques Godinho; João de Barros; Joaquim Pedro Martins; Albano Portugal Durão (as interim) pt:António do Lago Cerqueira (as interim); Vasco Borges; José Mendes Cabeçadas(as interim); Armando da Gama Ochoa; Óscar Carmona
- Preceded by: Augusto de Castro Corte-Real
- Succeeded by: Tomás António Garcia Rosado

High Commissioner of the Republic in Angola
- In office 1921–1923
- President: António José de Almeida
- Prime Minister: Bernardino Machado; Tomé de Barros Queirós; António Granjo; Manuel Maria Coelho; Carlos Maia Pinto; Francisco Cunha Leal; António Maria da Silva
- Minister of the Colonies: António de Paiva Gomes; Tomé de Barros Queirós (as interim); Celestino de Almeida; Manuel Ferreira da Rocha; Carlos Maia Pinto; José Eduardo de Carvalho Crato(as interim); Manuel Maria Coelho (as interim); Carlos Maia Pinto; Tomás Wylie Fernandes; Francisco Rego Chaves; Alfredo Rodrigues Gaspar
- Preceded by: José de Abreu Barbosa Bacelar
- Succeeded by: Miguel de Almeida Santos

Minister of War of Portugal
- In office 22 July 1915 – 10 May 1917
- President: Teófilo Braga; Bernardino Machado
- Prime Minister: José de Castro; Afonso Costa; António José de Almeida; Afonso Costa
- Preceded by: José de Castro
- Succeeded by: Afonso Costa

Minister of Foreign Affairs of Portugal
- Interim
- In office 14 May – 15 May 1915
- President: Manuel de Arriaga
- Prime Minister: Himself
- Preceded by: Augusto Vieira Soares
- Succeeded by: Augusto Vieira Soares
- Interim
- In office 12 July 1916 – 25 April 1917
- President: Bernardino Machado
- Prime Minister: António José de Almeida
- Preceded by: Augusto Vieira Soares
- Succeeded by: Augusto Vieira Soares

Minister of the Colonies of Portugal
- Interim
- In office 14 May – 15 May 1915
- President: Manuel de Arriaga
- Prime Minister: Himself
- Succeeded by: José Jorge Pereira

Governor-General of Angola
- In office 1912–1915
- President: Manuel de Arriaga
- Prime Minister: Augusto de Vasconcelos; Duarte Leite; Augusto de Vasconcelos (as interim); Duarte Leite; Afonso Costa; Bernardino Machado; Victor Hugo de Azevedo Coutinho
- Minister of the Colonies: António Macieira (as interim); Joaquim Cerveira de Albuquerque; Artur de Almeida Ribeiro; Alfredo Augusto Lisboa de Lima; Alfredo Rodrigues Gaspar
- Preceded by: José Maria Teixeira Guimarães
- Succeeded by: António Júlio da Costa Pereira de Eça

Personal details
- Born: José Maria Mendes Ribeiro Norton de Matos; 23 March 1867 Ponte de Lima, Portugal
- Died: 3 January 1955 (aged 87) Ponte de Lima, Portugal
- Parent(s): Tomás Mendes Norton (father); Emília da Conceição de Matos Prego e Sousa (mother)

Military service
- Allegiance: Kingdom of Portugal; Portugal
- Branch/service: (Kingdom of Portugal) (Portugal) Portuguese Army
- Years of service: 1898–1935
- Rank: General
- Battles/wars: WW1

José Maria Mendes Ribeiro Norton de Matos, GCTE, GCL (23 March 1867 – 3 January 1955) was a Portuguese general and politician.

== 1880s ==
After attending school in Braga, and attending the Escola Académica in Lisbon starting in 1880, Norton de Matos started his degree in mathematics at the University of Coimbra in 1884. During that period, he joined the army, and, between 1888 and 1890, he completed the General Staff Course in the Military Academy. After several minor assignments in the armed forces, in 1898, he departed for Portuguese India as the head of the newly-formed Department of Surveying of Portuguese India. He remained in that position until 1908. The year after, he traveled in Macau and China as part of a diplomatic mission tasked with redrawing the borders between the two.

In 1911, after the proclamation of the republic (5 October 1910), he joined the Democratic Party. His political influence continued to increase and, in April 1912, he was nominated Governor-General of Angola, a territory bordering German South West Africa.

== 1910s–1930s ==
Norton de Matos returned to Portugal in 1911, after Portugal became a republic in 1910. He was prepared to serve the new regime, and he soon became the chief of staff of the 5th military division. In 1912, he was initiated into the Free Masons. That same year, he gained the post of Governor-General of Angola. His leadership was considered instrumental in protecting the Portuguese colony from foreign powers such as Britain, Germany and France.

Norton de Matos was recalled to Portugal in 1915 due to the new political situation in Portugal during the First World War. There, he was named Minister of War. In this capacity, he was responsible for organizing the Portuguese intervention on the Western Front.

In 1917, Norton de Matos exiled himself to London after disagreements with the new republic. He later returned and became the Portuguese delegate to the Paris Peace Conference, which led to the Treaty of Versailles. Later he returned to Angola as High Commissioner of the Republic, from 1921 to 1923, before becoming Portuguese ambassador to the United Kingdom from 1923 to 1926. With the start of the Portuguese Military Dictatorship, he was removed from this position.

In 1929 he was elected Grand Master of the Free Masons in Portugal, a position he held between 1930 and 1935. In 1935, Salazar (prime minister since 1932) banned all secret organizations and removed from state functions a number of people deemed insufficiently faithful to the regime, among them Norton de Matos. Matos then stepped down from his position as Grand Master.

== 1940s ==
Norton de Matos returned to teaching, accepting a position as professor at the Instituto Superior Técnico, but was dismissed from his chair. He then became a leading opposition figure against the Salazar regime. In 1943, he was named to the National Council of Movement of National Antifascist Unity, or MUNAF, and on his 81st birthday, he was named the candidate of the opposition now united under the Movement of Democratic Unity (MUD, the successor organization to the MUNAF after 1945) for President in the election of 1949, under the dictatorial Estado Novo regime, while demanding freedom to advertise his message and the close inspection of votes. The regime refused these demands, and Norton de Matos withdrew from the election on 12 February 1949.

Despite his fierce opposition to Salazar, Norton de Matos also defended Portuguese colonialism. In 1953, he published a book titled Africa Nossa (Our Africa) where he made an appeal for policies that would promote massive territorial occupation by Portuguese white settlers in Africa and at the same time support the gradual assimilation of the African populations.

Norton de Matos continued to lead a democratic opposition movement centered in the city of Porto. He died in his hometown of Ponte de Lima in 1955.
