= List of prime ministers of Portugal =

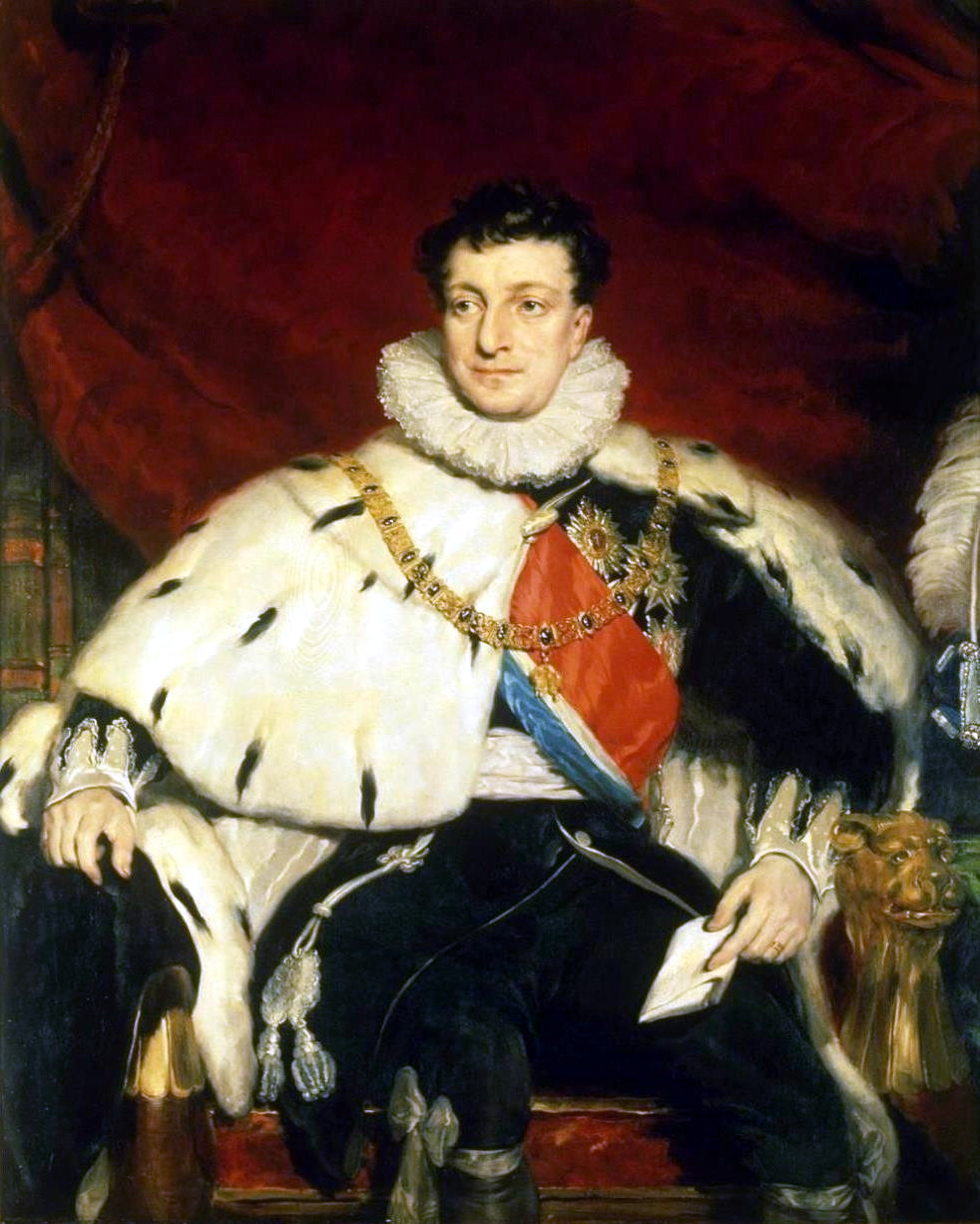
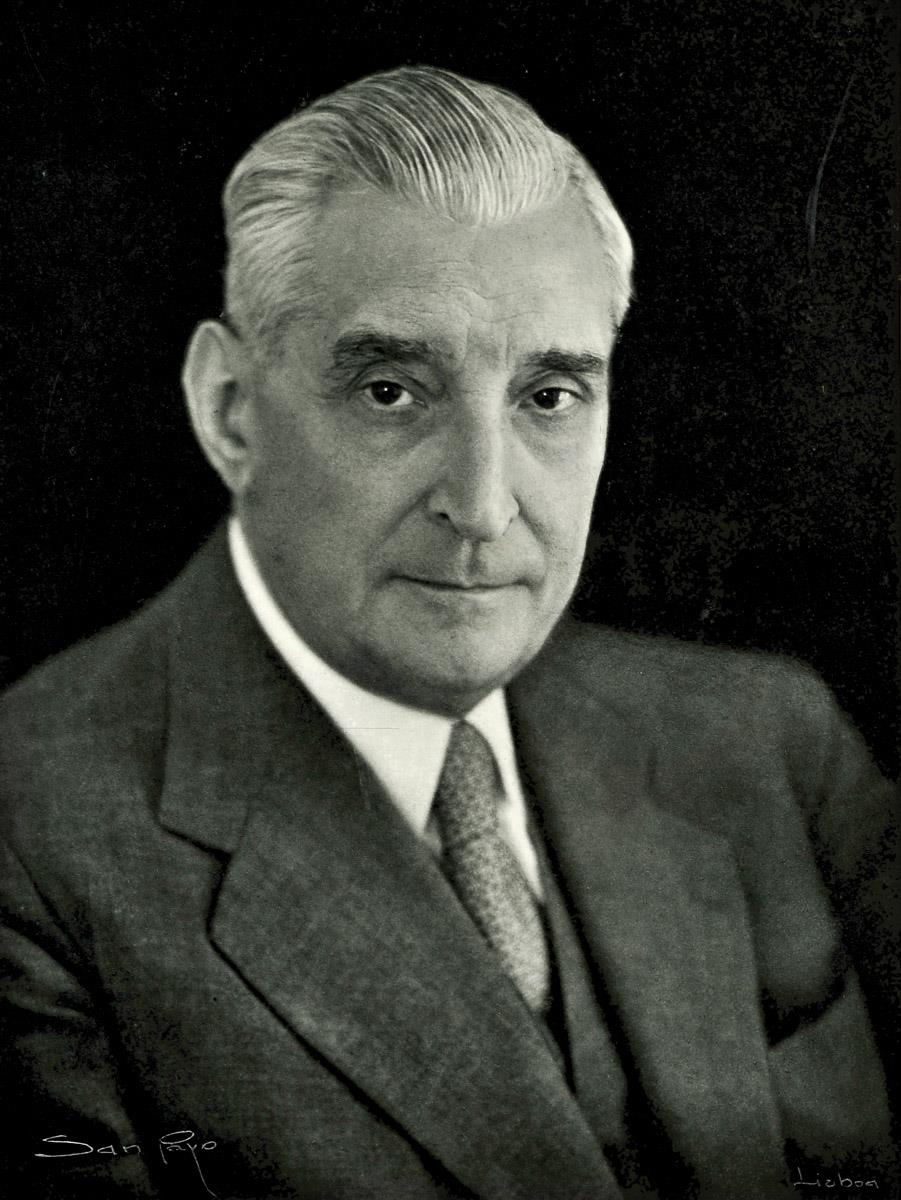
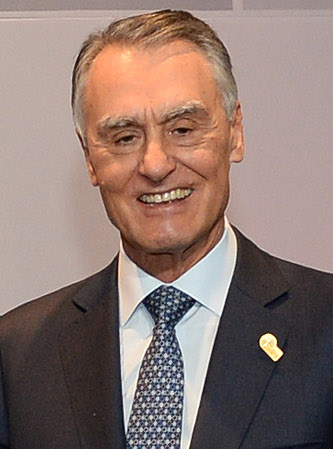
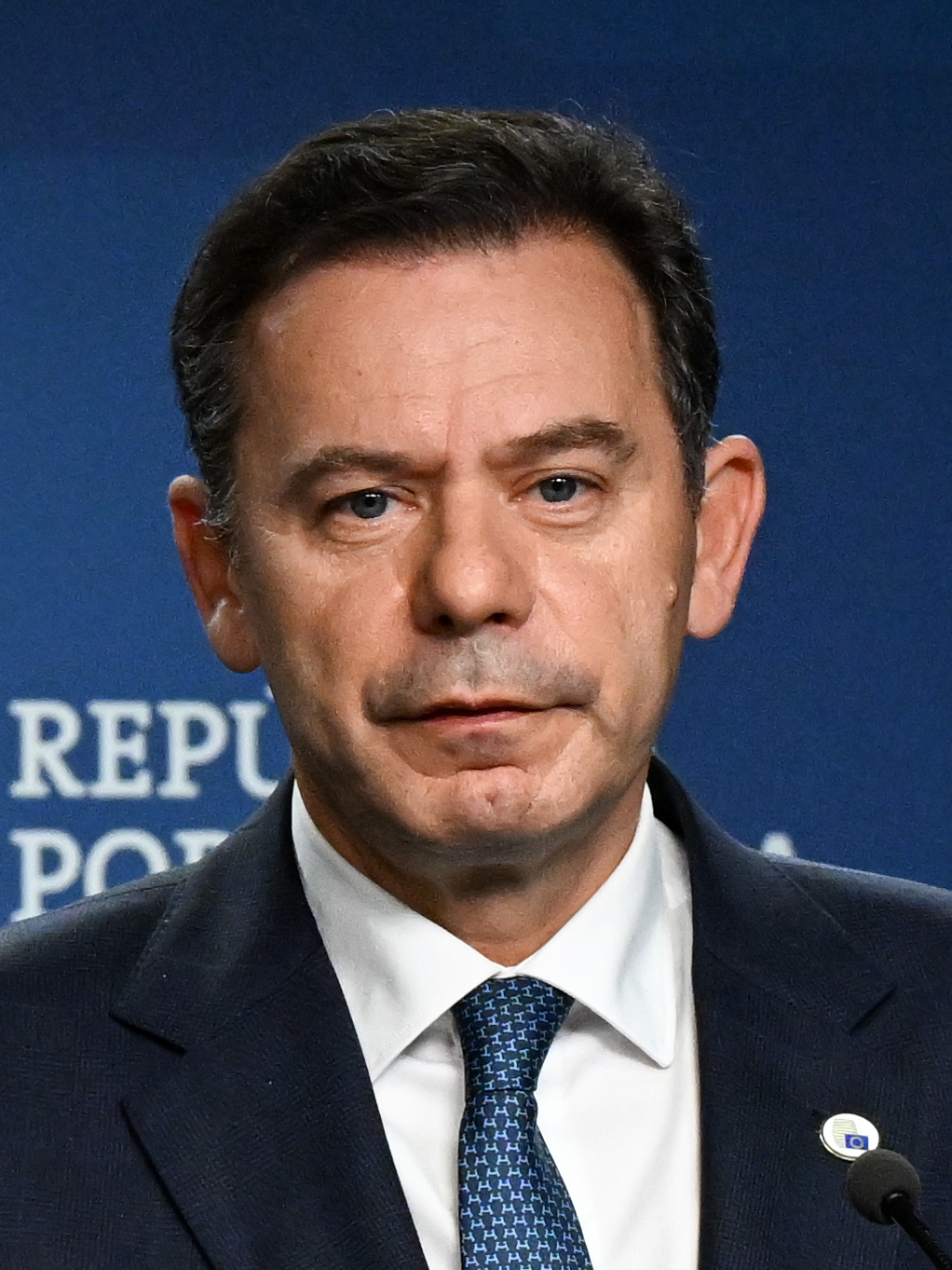
- Top left: Pedro de Sousa Holstein, 1st Duke of Palmela was the first prime minister to be referred as such.
- Top right: António de Oliveira Salazar was the longest serving head of government.
- Bottom left: Aníbal Cavaco Silva was the longest serving prime minister in democracy.
- Bottom right: Luís Montenegro is the incumbent prime minister.

The prime minister of the Portuguese Republic (Portuguese: primeiro-ministro da República Portuguesa) is the head of the Government of Portugal. The officeholder coordinates the actions of all ministers, represents the Government as a whole, reports their actions and is accountable to the Assembly of the Republic, in addition to keeping the president of the Republic informed.

There is no limit to the number of mandates as prime minister. They are appointed by the president of the Republic, after the legislative elections and after an audience with every leader of a party represented at the Assembly. It is usual for the leader of the party which receives a plurality of votes in the elections to be named prime minister.

The official residence of the prime minister is a mansion next to São Bento Palace, which, in confusion, is also often called "São Bento Palace", although many prime ministers did not live in the palace during their full mandate.

== History ==
The origins of present office of prime minister of Portugal fall back to the beginning of the Portuguese monarchy in the 12th century. Typically, a senior official of the king of Portugal prevailed over the others, ensuring the coordination of the administration of the kingdom as a kind of prime minister. Throughout history, the prominent position fell successively on the Mayor of the Palace (Portuguese Mordomo-Mor), on the Chancellor (Chanceler-Mor), on the king's private secretary (Escrivão da Puridade) and on the secretary of state (Secretário de Estado).

In 1736, three offices of secretary of state were created, with the Secretary of State of the Internal Affairs of the Kingdom (Secretário de Estado dos Negócios Interiores do Reino) occupying a prominent position over the others.

Since the Liberal Revolution of 1820, liberalism and parliamentarism were installed in the country. In the first liberal period, there were three to six secretaries of state with equal position in the hierarchy, but with the secretary the Internal Affairs of the Kingdom (usually known by Minister of the Kingdom) continuing to occupy a prominent position. Occasionally there was a Minister Assistant to the Dispatch (Ministro Assistante ao Despacho), a coordinator of all secretaries of state, and with a post similar to that of a prime minister. After a brief absolutistic restoration, the second liberalism started. With the beginning of the Constitutional Monarchy, the office of President of the Council of Ministers (Presidente do Conselho de Ministros) was created. The presidents of the council were clearly the heads of government of the kingdom, holding the executive power that absolute monarchs had, but were restricted by the controlling power of the National Congress.

With the advent of the Republic in the 5 October 1910 revolution, the head of government was renamed President of the Ministry (Presidente do Ministério). During this period the heads of government were under the strong power of the parliament and often fell due to parliamentary turmoils and social instability.

With the 28 May 1926 coup d'état, and eventually, after the formation of the Estado Novo quasi-fascist dictatorial regime of António de Oliveira Salazar, the prime minister was again named President of the Council of Ministers, and was nominally the most important figure in the country. First Salazar and then Marcello Caetano occupied this post for almost 42 years.

With the Carnation Revolution came the prime minister, which replaced the president of the council.

== Prime ministers ==
The official counting of prime ministers starts with the first president of the Council of Ministers of the constitutional monarchy. The first column shows the name (and title during the monarchy) of each office holder, with the second and third column showing the start and end of term. A fourth column counts the duration of each term. The next column shows each election won by each Prime Minister, followed by the color and political affiliation of the holder. Then, there's a column listing each constitutional governments headed by each Prime Minister, and finally, a last column showing the head of state during the term of each office holder, between 1834 and 1910, a Monarch, and since 1910, a President.

The colors indicate the political affiliation:

No party/independent
Chartist/Chamorro
Septemberist
Regenerator
Historic
Reformist
Progressist
Liberal Regenerator
Republican
Democratic
National Republican
Republican Liberal
Reconstitution
Nationalist Republican
Democratic Leftwing Republican
National Union/People's National Action
Democratic Renewal Party
Socialist
Social Democratic
Democratic and Social Centre
Interim holder

=== Constitutional Monarchy – Second Liberalism (1834–1910) ===
Portrait	Prime minister (Lifespan)	Term of office			Election	Party	Government	Monarch (Reign)
Portrait	Prime minister (Lifespan)	Start	End	Duration	Election	Party	Government	Monarch (Reign)
	Duke of Palmela; Pedro de Sousa Holstein (1781–1850)	24 September 1834	4 May 1835	222 days	1834	Chartist/"Chamorro"	1st Dev.	Maria II (1834–1853) and Fernando II (1837–1853)
	Count of Linhares; Vitório Maria de Sousa Coutinho (1790–1857)	4 May 1835	27 May 1835	23 days	—	"Chamorro"	1st Dev.	Maria II (1834–1853) and Fernando II (1837–1853)
	Duke of Saldanha; João Carlos de Saldanha Oliveira e Daun (1790–1876)	27 May 1835	18 November 1835	175 days	—	Independent	2nd Dev.	Maria II (1834–1853) and Fernando II (1837–1853)
	José Jorge Loureiro (1791–1860)	18 November 1835	20 April 1836	153 days	—	Independent	3rd Dev.	Maria II (1834–1853) and Fernando II (1837–1853)
	Duke of Terceira; António José Severim de Noronha (1792–1860)	20 April 1836	10 September 1836	222 days	—	"Chamorro"	4th Dev.	Maria II (1834–1853) and Fernando II (1837–1853)
	Duke of Terceira; António José Severim de Noronha (1792–1860)	20 April 1836	10 September 1836	222 days	Jul.1836	"Chamorro"	4th Dev.	Maria II (1834–1853) and Fernando II (1837–1853)
	Count of Lumiares; José da Gama Carneiro e Sousa (1788–1849)	10 September 1836	4 November 1836	55 days	—	Septemberist	1st Set.	Maria II (1834–1853) and Fernando II (1837–1853)
	Marquis of Valença; José Bernardino de Portugal e Castro (1780–1840) (did not take office)	4 November 1836	5 November 1836	1 day	—	Independent	1st Set.	Maria II (1834–1853) and Fernando II (1837–1853)
	Marquis of Sá da Bandeira; Bernardo de Sá Nogueira de Figueiredo (1795–1876)	5 November 1836	1 June 1837	208 days	—	Septemberist	2nd Set.	Maria II (1834–1853) and Fernando II (1837–1853)
	Marquis of Sá da Bandeira; Bernardo de Sá Nogueira de Figueiredo (1795–1876)	5 November 1836	1 June 1837	208 days	Nov.1836	Septemberist	2nd Set.	Maria II (1834–1853) and Fernando II (1837–1853)
	António Dias de Oliveira (1804–1863)	1 June 1837	2 August 1837	62 days	—	Septemberist	3rd Set.	Maria II (1834–1853) and Fernando II (1837–1853)
	Marquis of Sá da Bandeira; Bernardo de Sá Nogueira de Figueiredo (1795–1876)	2 August 1837	18 April 1839	1 year, 259 days	—	Septemberist	2nd Set.	Maria II (1834–1853) and Fernando II (1837–1853)
	Marquis of Sá da Bandeira; Bernardo de Sá Nogueira de Figueiredo (1795–1876)	2 August 1837	18 April 1839	1 year, 259 days	1838	Septemberist	2nd Set.	Maria II (1834–1853) and Fernando II (1837–1853)
	Baron of Ribeira de Sabrosa; Rodrigo Pinto Pizarro (1788–1841)	18 April 1839	26 November 1839	222 days	—	Septemberist	5th Set.	Maria II (1834–1853) and Fernando II (1837–1853)
	Count of Bonfim; José Travassos Valdez (1787–1862)	26 November 1839	9 June 1841	1 year, 259 days	—	Septemberist	6th Set.	Maria II (1834–1853) and Fernando II (1837–1853)
	Count of Bonfim; José Travassos Valdez (1787–1862)	26 November 1839	9 June 1841	1 year, 259 days	1840	Septemberist	6th Set.	Maria II (1834–1853) and Fernando II (1837–1853)
	Joaquim António de Aguiar (1792–1884)	9 June 1841	7 February 1842	243 days	—	Septemberist	7th Set.	Maria II (1834–1853) and Fernando II (1837–1853)
	Duke of Palmela; Pedro de Sousa Holstein (1781–1850) (2nd time)	7 February 1842	9 February 1842	3 days	—	Independent	G.E.	Maria II (1834–1853) and Fernando II (1837–1853)
	Duke of Terceira; António José Severim de Noronha (1792–1860) (2nd time)	9 February 1842	20 May 1846	4 years, 100 days	—	Chartist	1st R. Cart.	Maria II (1834–1853) and Fernando II (1837–1853)
	Duke of Terceira; António José Severim de Noronha (1792–1860) (2nd time)	9 February 1842	20 May 1846	4 years, 100 days	1842	Chartist	1st R. Cart.	Maria II (1834–1853) and Fernando II (1837–1853)
	Duke of Terceira; António José Severim de Noronha (1792–1860) (2nd time)	9 February 1842	20 May 1846	4 years, 100 days	1845	Chartist	1st R. Cart.	Maria II (1834–1853) and Fernando II (1837–1853)
	Duke of Palmela; Pedro de Sousa Holstein (1781–1850) (3rd time)	20 May 1846	6 October 1846	139 days	—	Chartist	2nd R. Cart.	Maria II (1834–1853) and Fernando II (1837–1853)
	Duke of Saldanha; João Carlos de Saldanha Oliveira e Daun (1790–1876) (2nd time)	6 October 1846	18 June 1849	2 years, 255 days	—	Chartist	3rd R. Cart.	Maria II (1834–1853) and Fernando II (1837–1853)
	Duke of Saldanha; João Carlos de Saldanha Oliveira e Daun (1790–1876) (2nd time)	6 October 1846	18 June 1849	2 years, 255 days	1847	Chartist	3rd R. Cart.	Maria II (1834–1853) and Fernando II (1837–1853)
	Marquis of Tomar; António Bernardo da Costa Cabral (1803–1889)	18 June 1849	26 April 1851	1 year, 312 days	—	Chartist	4th R. Cart.	Maria II (1834–1853) and Fernando II (1837–1853)
	Duke of Terceira; António José Severim de Noronha (1792–1860) (3rd time)	26 April 1851	1 May 1851	5 days	—	Regenerator	5th R. Cart.	Maria II (1834–1853) and Fernando II (1837–1853)
	Duke of Saldanha; João Carlos de Saldanha Oliveira e Daun (1790–1876) (3rd time)	1 May 1851	6 June 1856	5 years, 36 days	—	Regenerator	1st Reg.	Maria II (1834–1853) and Fernando II (1837–1853)
	Duke of Saldanha; João Carlos de Saldanha Oliveira e Daun (1790–1876) (3rd time)	1 May 1851	6 June 1856	5 years, 36 days	1851	Regenerator	1st Reg.	Maria II (1834–1853) and Fernando II (1837–1853)
	Duke of Saldanha; João Carlos de Saldanha Oliveira e Daun (1790–1876) (3rd time)	1 May 1851	6 June 1856	5 years, 36 days	1852	Regenerator	1st Reg.	Pedro V (1853–1861)
	Duke of Loulé; Nuno José de Moura Barreto (1804–1875)	6 June 1856	16 March 1859	2 years, 283 days	—	Historic	2nd Reg.	Pedro V (1853–1861)
	Duke of Loulé; Nuno José de Moura Barreto (1804–1875)	6 June 1856	16 March 1859	2 years, 283 days	1856	Historic	2nd Reg.	Pedro V (1853–1861)
	Duke of Loulé; Nuno José de Moura Barreto (1804–1875)	6 June 1856	16 March 1859	2 years, 283 days	1858	Historic	2nd Reg.	Pedro V (1853–1861)
	Duke of Terceira; António José Severim de Noronha (1792–1860) (4th time)	16 March 1859	1 May 1860 (died)	1 year, 46 days	—	Regenerator	3rd Reg.	Pedro V (1853–1861)
	Duke of Terceira; António José Severim de Noronha (1792–1860) (4th time)	16 March 1859	1 May 1860 (died)	1 year, 46 days	1860	Regenerator	3rd Reg.	Pedro V (1853–1861)
	Joaquim António de Aguiar (1792–1884) (2nd time)	1 May 1860	4 July 1860	65 days	—	Regenerator	3rd Reg.	Pedro V (1853–1861)
	Duke of Loulé; Nuno José de Moura Barreto (1804–1875) (2nd time)	4 July 1860	17 April 1865	4 years, 287 days	—	Historic	4th Reg.	Pedro V (1853–1861)
	Duke of Loulé; Nuno José de Moura Barreto (1804–1875) (2nd time)	4 July 1860	17 April 1865	4 years, 287 days	1861	Historic	4th Reg.	Pedro V (1853–1861)
	Duke of Loulé; Nuno José de Moura Barreto (1804–1875) (2nd time)	4 July 1860	17 April 1865	4 years, 287 days	1864	Historic	4th Reg.	Luis I (1861–1889)
	Marquis of Sá da Bandeira; Bernardo de Sá Nogueira de Figueiredo (1795–1876) (3rd time)	17 April 1865	4 September 1865	140 days	—	Reformist	5th Reg.	Luis I (1861–1889)
	Joaquim António de Aguiar (1792–1884) (3rd time)	4 September 1865	4 January 1868	2 years, 122 days	1865	Regenerator (with Historic)	6th Reg.	Luis I (1861–1889)
	Joaquim António de Aguiar (1792–1884) (3rd time)	4 September 1865	4 January 1868	2 years, 122 days	1867	Regenerator (with Historic)	6th Reg.	Luis I (1861–1889)
	Duke of Ávila and Bolama; António José de Ávila (1807–1881)	4 January 1868	22 July 1868	199 days	—	Independent (with Reformist)	7th Reg.	Luis I (1861–1889)
	Marquis of Sá da Bandeira; Bernardo de Sá Nogueira de Figueiredo (1795–1876) (4th time)	22 July 1868	11 August 1869	1 year, 20 days	1868	Reformist	8th Reg.	Luis I (1861–1889)
	Duke of Loulé; Nuno José de Moura Barreto (1804–1875) (3rd time)	11 August 1869	19 May 1870	282 days	1869	Historic (with Reformist)	9th Reg.	Luis I (1861–1889)
	Duke of Loulé; Nuno José de Moura Barreto (1804–1875) (3rd time)	11 August 1869	19 May 1870	282 days	Mar.1870	Historic (with Reformist)	9th Reg.	Luis I (1861–1889)
	Duke of Saldanha; João Carlos de Saldanha Oliveira e Daun (1790–1876) (4th time)	19 May 1870	29 August 1870	102 days	—	Regenerator	10th Reg.	Luis I (1861–1889)
	Marquis of Sá da Bandeira; Bernardo de Sá Nogueira de Figueiredo (1795–1876) (5th time)	29 August 1870	29 October 1870	1 year, 20 days	—	Reformist	11th Reg.	Luis I (1861–1889)
	Marquis of Sá da Bandeira; Bernardo de Sá Nogueira de Figueiredo (1795–1876) (5th time)	29 August 1870	29 October 1870	1 year, 20 days	Sep.1870	Reformist	11th Reg.	Luis I (1861–1889)
	Duke of Ávila and Bolama; António José de Ávila (1807–1881) (2nd time)	29 October 1870	13 September 1871	319 days	—	Reformist	12th Reg.	Luis I (1861–1889)
	Duke of Ávila and Bolama; António José de Ávila (1807–1881) (2nd time)	29 October 1870	13 September 1871	319 days	1871	Reformist	12th Reg.	Luis I (1861–1889)
	Fontes Pereira de Melo (1819–1887)	13 September 1871	6 March 1877	5 years, 174 days	—	Regenerator	13th Reg.	Luis I (1861–1889)
	Fontes Pereira de Melo (1819–1887)	13 September 1871	6 March 1877	5 years, 174 days	1874	Regenerator	13th Reg.	Luis I (1861–1889)
	Duke of Ávila and Bolama; António José de Ávila (1807–1881) (3rd time)	6 March 1877	26 January 1878	326 days	—	Reformist	14th Reg.	Luis I (1861–1889)
	Fontes Pereira de Melo (1819–1887) (2nd time)	26 January 1878	29 May 1879	1 year, 123 days	—	Regenerator	15th Reg.	Luis I (1861–1889)
	Fontes Pereira de Melo (1819–1887) (2nd time)	26 January 1878	29 May 1879	1 year, 123 days	1878	Regenerator	15th Reg.	Luis I (1861–1889)
	Anselmo José Braamcamp (1817–1885)	29 May 1879	23 March 1881	1 year, 298 days	—	Progressist	16th Reg.	Luis I (1861–1889)
	Anselmo José Braamcamp (1817–1885)	29 May 1879	23 March 1881	1 year, 298 days	1879	Progressist	16th Reg.	Luis I (1861–1889)
	António Rodrigues Sampaio (1806–1882)	23 March 1881	14 November 1881	236 days	—	Regenerator	17th Reg.	Luis I (1861–1889)
	António Rodrigues Sampaio (1806–1882)	23 March 1881	14 November 1881	236 days	1881	Regenerator	17th Reg.	Luis I (1861–1889)
	Fontes Pereira de Melo (1819–1887) (3rd time)	14 November 1881	16 February 1886	4 years, 94 days	—	Regenerator	17th Reg.	Luis I (1861–1889)
	Fontes Pereira de Melo (1819–1887) (3rd time)	14 November 1881	16 February 1886	4 years, 94 days	1884	Regenerator	17th Reg.	Luis I (1861–1889)
	José Luciano de Castro (1834–1914)	16 February 1886	14 January 1890	3 years, 332 days	—	Progressist	18th Reg.	Luis I (1861–1889)
	José Luciano de Castro (1834–1914)	16 February 1886	14 January 1890	3 years, 332 days	1887	Progressist	18th Reg.	Luis I (1861–1889)
	José Luciano de Castro (1834–1914)	16 February 1886	14 January 1890	3 years, 332 days	1889	Progressist	18th Reg.	Carlos I (1889–1908)
	António de Serpa Pimentel (1825–1900)	14 January 1890	11 October 1890	271 days	—	Regenerator	19th Reg.	Carlos I (1889–1908)
	António de Serpa Pimentel (1825–1900)	14 January 1890	11 October 1890	271 days	1890	Regenerator	19th Reg.	Carlos I (1889–1908)
	João Crisóstomo (1811–1895)	11 October 1890	18 January 1892	1 year, 99 days	—	Independent	20th Reg.	Carlos I (1889–1908)
	José Dias Ferreira (1837–1909)	18 January 1892	22 February 1893	1 year, 35 days	—	Independent	21st Reg.	Carlos I (1889–1908)
	José Dias Ferreira (1837–1909)	18 January 1892	22 February 1893	1 year, 35 days	1892	Independent	21st Reg.	Carlos I (1889–1908)
	Ernesto Hintze Ribeiro (1849–1907)	22 February 1893	5 February 1897	3 years, 348 days	—	Regenerator	22nd Reg.	Carlos I (1889–1908)
	Ernesto Hintze Ribeiro (1849–1907)	22 February 1893	5 February 1897	3 years, 348 days	1894	Regenerator	22nd Reg.	Carlos I (1889–1908)
	Ernesto Hintze Ribeiro (1849–1907)	22 February 1893	5 February 1897	3 years, 348 days	1895	Regenerator	22nd Reg.	Carlos I (1889–1908)
	José Luciano de Castro (1834–1914) (2nd time)	5 February 1897	26 July 1900	3 years, 172 days	—	Progressist	23rd Reg.	Carlos I (1889–1908)
	José Luciano de Castro (1834–1914) (2nd time)	5 February 1897	26 July 1900	3 years, 172 days	1897	Progressist	23rd Reg.	Carlos I (1889–1908)
	José Luciano de Castro (1834–1914) (2nd time)	5 February 1897	26 July 1900	3 years, 172 days	1899	Progressist	23rd Reg.	Carlos I (1889–1908)
	Ernesto Hintze Ribeiro (1849–1907) (2nd time)	26 July 1900	20 October 1904	4 years, 86 days	—	Regenerator	24th Reg.	Carlos I (1889–1908)
	Ernesto Hintze Ribeiro (1849–1907) (2nd time)	26 July 1900	20 October 1904	4 years, 86 days	1900	Regenerator	24th Reg.	Carlos I (1889–1908)
	Ernesto Hintze Ribeiro (1849–1907) (2nd time)	26 July 1900	20 October 1904	4 years, 86 days	1901	Regenerator	24th Reg.	Carlos I (1889–1908)
	Ernesto Hintze Ribeiro (1849–1907) (2nd time)	26 July 1900	20 October 1904	4 years, 86 days	1904	Regenerator	24th Reg.	Carlos I (1889–1908)
	José Luciano de Castro (1834–1914) (3rd time)	20 October 1904	19 March 1906	1 year, 150 days	—	Progressist	25th Reg.	Carlos I (1889–1908)
	José Luciano de Castro (1834–1914) (3rd time)	20 October 1904	19 March 1906	1 year, 150 days	1905	Progressist	25th Reg.	Carlos I (1889–1908)
	Ernesto Hintze Ribeiro (1849–1907) (3rd time)	19 March 1906	19 May 1906	61 days	—	Regenerator	26th Reg.	Carlos I (1889–1908)
	Ernesto Hintze Ribeiro (1849–1907) (3rd time)	19 March 1906	19 May 1906	61 days	Apr.1906	Regenerator	26th Reg.	Carlos I (1889–1908)
	João Franco (1855–1929)	19 May 1906	4 February 1908	1 year, 311 days	—	Liberal Regenerator	27th Reg.	Carlos I (1889–1908)
	João Franco (1855–1929)	19 May 1906	4 February 1908	1 year, 311 days	Aug.1906	Liberal Regenerator	27th Reg.	Carlos I (1889–1908)
	Francisco Ferreira do Amaral (1844–1923)	4 February 1908	26 December 1908	327 days	—	Independent	28th Reg.	Manuel II (1908–1910)
	Francisco Ferreira do Amaral (1844–1923)	4 February 1908	26 December 1908	327 days	1908	Independent	28th Reg.	Manuel II (1908–1910)
	Artur de Campos Henriques (1853–1922)	26 December 1908	11 April 1909	106 days	—	Independent	29th Reg.	Manuel II (1908–1910)
	Sebastião Teles (1847–1921)	11 April 1909	14 May 1909	33 days	—	Independent	30th Reg.	Manuel II (1908–1910)
	Venceslau de Lima (1858–1919)	14 May 1909	22 December 1909	222 days	—	Independent	31st Reg.	Manuel II (1908–1910)
	Francisco da Veiga Beirão (1841–1916)	22 December 1909	26 June 1910	185 days	—	Regenerator	32nd Reg.	Manuel II (1908–1910)
	António Teixeira de Sousa (1857–1917)	26 June 1910	5 October 1910	101 days	—	Regenerator	33rd Reg.	Manuel II (1908–1910)
	António Teixeira de Sousa (1857–1917)	26 June 1910	5 October 1910	101 days	1910	Regenerator	33rd Reg.	Manuel II (1908–1910)

=== First Republic (1910–1926) ===
Portrait	Prime minister (Lifespan)	Term of office			Election	Party	Government	President (Mandate)
Portrait	Prime minister (Lifespan)	Start	End	Duration	Election	Party	Government	President (Mandate)
	Teófilo Braga (1843–1924)	5 October 1910	4 September 1911	323 days	—	Republican	1st	Teófilo Braga (1910–1911)
	Teófilo Braga (1843–1924)	5 October 1910	4 September 1911	323 days	C. 1911	Republican	1st	Teófilo Braga (1910–1911)
	João Chagas (1863–1925)	4 September 1911	13 November 1911	72 days	—	Republican	2nd	Manuel de Arriaga (1911–1915)
	Augusto de Vasconcelos (1867–1951)	13 November 1911	16 June 1912	215 days	—	Republican	3rd	Manuel de Arriaga (1911–1915)
	Duarte Leite (1864–1950)	16 June 1912	23 September 1912	99 days	—	Republican	4th	Manuel de Arriaga (1911–1915)
	Augusto de Vasconcelos (1867–1951) (interim)	23 September 1912	30 September 1912	7 days	—	Republican	4th	Manuel de Arriaga (1911–1915)
	Duarte Leite (1864–1950)	30 September 1912	9 January 1913	101 days	—	Republican	4th	Manuel de Arriaga (1911–1915)
	Afonso Costa (1871–1937)	9 January 1913	9 February 1914	1 year, 31 days	—	Democratic	5th	Manuel de Arriaga (1911–1915)
	Afonso Costa (1871–1937)	9 January 1913	9 February 1914	1 year, 31 days	1913	Democratic	5th	Manuel de Arriaga (1911–1915)
	Bernardino Machado (1851–1944)	9 February 1914	12 December 1914	307 days	—	Democratic	6th	Manuel de Arriaga (1911–1915)
	Bernardino Machado (1851–1944)	9 February 1914	12 December 1914	307 days	—	Democratic	7th	Manuel de Arriaga (1911–1915)
	Victor Hugo de Azevedo Coutinho (1871–1955)	12 December 1914	25 January 1915	44 days	—	Democratic	8th	Manuel de Arriaga (1911–1915)
	Joaquim Pimenta de Castro (1846–1918)	25 January 1915	14 May 1915	109 days	—	Independent	9th	Manuel de Arriaga (1911–1915)
Constitutional Junta composed of: José Norton de Matos; António Maria da Silva; José de Freitas Ribeiro; Alfredo de Sá Cardoso; Álvaro de Castro		14 May 1915	15 May 1915	1 day	—	Independent	—	Manuel de Arriaga (1911–1915)
	João Chagas (1863–1925) (did not take office)	15 May 1915	17 May 1915	2 days	—	Independent	10th	Manuel de Arriaga (1911–1915)
	José de Castro (1868–1929)	17 May 1915	29 November 1915	196 days	—	Democratic	10th	Teófilo Braga (1915)
	José de Castro (1868–1929)	17 May 1915	29 November 1915	196 days	1915	Democratic	11th	Teófilo Braga (1915)
	Afonso Costa (1871–1937) (2nd time)	29 November 1915	16 March 1916	107 days	—	Democratic	12th	Bernardino Machado (1915–1917)
	António José de Almeida (1866–1929)	16 March 1916	25 April 1917	1 year, 40 days	—	Sacred Union (Evolutionist with Democratic)	13th	Bernardino Machado (1915–1917)
	Afonso Costa (1871–1937) (3rd time)	25 April 1917	7 October 1917	165 days	—	Democratic	14th	Bernardino Machado (1915–1917)
	José Norton de Matos (1867–1955) (interim)	7 October 1917	25 October 1917	18 days	—	Democratic	14th	Bernardino Machado (1915–1917)
	Afonso Costa (1871–1937) (4th time)	25 October 1917	17 November 1917	23 days	—	Democratic	14th	Bernardino Machado (1915–1917)
	José Norton de Matos (1867–1955) (interim)	17 November 1917	8 December 1917	21 days	—	Democratic	14th	Bernardino Machado (1915–1917)
	Sidónio Pais (1872–1918)	8 December 1917	14 December 1918 (Died)	1 year, 6 days	—	National Republican	15th	Sidónio Pais (1918)
	Sidónio Pais (1872–1918)	8 December 1917	14 December 1918 (Died)	1 year, 6 days	1918	National Republican	16th	Sidónio Pais (1918)
	João do Canto e Castro (1862–1934)	14 December 1918	23 December 1918	9 days	—	National Republican	16th	João do Canto e Castro (1918–1919)
	João Tamagnini Barbosa (1883–1948)	23 December 1918	27 January 1919	35 days	—	National Republican	17th	João do Canto e Castro (1918–1919)
	João Tamagnini Barbosa (1883–1948)	23 December 1918	27 January 1919	35 days	—	National Republican	18th	João do Canto e Castro (1918–1919)
	Henrique de Paiva Couceiro (1861–1944) (disputed)	19 January 1919	14 February 1919	5 days	—	Independent	—	João do Canto e Castro (1918–1919)
	José Relvas (1858–1929)	27 January 1919	30 March 1919	62 days	—	Independent	19th	João do Canto e Castro (1918–1919)
	Domingos Leite Pereira (1882–1956)	30 March 1919	30 June 1919	92 days	—	Independent	20th	João do Canto e Castro (1918–1919)
	Alfredo de Sá Cardoso (1864–1950)	30 June 1919	15 January 1920	199 days	—	Democratic	21st	João do Canto e Castro (1918–1919)
	Alfredo de Sá Cardoso (1864–1950)	30 June 1919	15 January 1920	199 days	1919	Democratic	21st	António José de Almeida (1919–1923)
	Francisco José Fernandes Costa (1857–1925) (did not take office)	15 January 1920		0 days	—	Republican Liberal	22nd	António José de Almeida (1919–1923)
	Alfredo de Sá Cardoso (1864–1950) (reconducted)	15 January 1920	21 January 1920	6 days	—	Democratic	21st	António José de Almeida (1919–1923)
	Domingos Leite Pereira (1882–1956) (2nd time)	21 January 1920	8 March 1920	47 days	—	Independent	23rd	António José de Almeida (1919–1923)
	António Maria Baptista (1866–1920)	8 March 1920	6 June 1920 (Died)	90 days	—	Democratic	24th	António José de Almeida (1919–1923)
	José Ramos Preto (1871–1949)	6 June 1920	26 June 1920	20 days	—	Democratic	24th	António José de Almeida (1919–1923)
	António Maria da Silva (1872–1950)	26 June 1920	19 July 1920	23 days	—	Democratic	25th	António José de Almeida (1919–1923)
	António Granjo (1881–1921)	19 July 1920	20 November 1920	93 days	—	Republican Liberal (with Reconstitution)	26th	António José de Almeida (1919–1923)
	Álvaro de Castro (1878–1928)	20 November 1920	30 November 1920	10 days	—	Reconstitution	27th	António José de Almeida (1919–1923)
	Liberato Pinto (1880–1949)	30 November 1920	2 March 1921	92 days	—	Democratic (with Reconstitution and Populars)	28th	António José de Almeida (1919–1923)
	Bernardino Machado (1851–1944) (2nd time)	2 March 1921	23 May 1921	82 days	—	Democratic (with Reconstitution and Populars)	29th	António José de Almeida (1919–1923)
	Tomé de Barros Queirós (1872–1925)	23 May 1921	30 August 1921	99 days	—	Republican Liberal	30th	António José de Almeida (1919–1923)
	António Granjo (1881–1921) (2nd time)	30 August 1921	19 October 1921 (Died)	50 days	1921	Republican Liberal	31st	António José de Almeida (1919–1923)
	Manuel Maria Coelho (1857–1943)	19 October 1921	5 November 1921	16 days	—	Independent	32nd	António José de Almeida (1919–1923)
	Carlos Maia Pinto (1866–1932)	5 November 1921	16 December 1921	41 days	—	Independent	33rd	António José de Almeida (1919–1923)
	Francisco Cunha Leal (1888–1970)	16 December 1921	7 February 1922	53 days	—	Independent	34th	António José de Almeida (1919–1923)
	António Maria da Silva (1872–1950) (2nd time)	7 February 1922	15 November 1923	1 year, 281 days	1922	Democratic	35th	António José de Almeida (1919–1923)
	António Maria da Silva (1872–1950) (2nd time)	7 February 1922	15 November 1923	1 year, 281 days	—	Democratic	36th	António José de Almeida (1919–1923)
	António Maria da Silva (1872–1950) (2nd time)	7 February 1922	15 November 1923	1 year, 281 days	—	Democratic	37th	Manuel Teixeira Gomes (1923–1925)
	António Ginestal Machado (1874–1940)	15 November 1923	18 December 1923	33 days	—	Nationalist Republican	38th	Manuel Teixeira Gomes (1923–1925)
	Álvaro de Castro (1878–1928) (2nd time)	18 December 1923	7 July 1924	202 days	—	Nationalist Republican (with Democratic)	39th	Manuel Teixeira Gomes (1923–1925)
	Alfredo Rodrigues Gaspar (1865–1938)	7 July 1924	22 November 1924	138 days	—	Democratic	40th	Manuel Teixeira Gomes (1923–1925)
	José Domingues dos Santos (1885–1958)	22 November 1924	15 February 1925	83 days	—	Democratic Leftwing Republican	41st	Manuel Teixeira Gomes (1923–1925)
	Vitorino Guimarães (1876–1957)	15 February 1925	1 July 1925	136 days	—	Democratic	42nd	Manuel Teixeira Gomes (1923–1925)
	António Maria da Silva (1872–1950) (3rd time)	1 July 1925	1 August 1925	30 days	—	Democratic	43rd	Manuel Teixeira Gomes (1923–1925)
	Domingos Leite Pereira (1882–1956) (3rd time)	1 August 1925	18 December 1925	140 days	—	Democratic	44th	Manuel Teixeira Gomes (1923–1925)
	António Maria da Silva (1872–1950) (4th time)	18 December 1925	30 May 1926	163 days	1925	Democratic	45th	Bernardino Machado (1925–1926)

=== Second Republic – Dictatorship (1926–1974) ===
Portrait	Prime minister (Lifespan)	Term of office			Election	Party	Government	President (Mandate)
Portrait	Prime minister (Lifespan)	Start	End	Duration	Election	Party	Government	President (Mandate)
Ditadura Nacional – Military Dictatorship (1926–1932)
	José Mendes Cabeçadas (1883–1965)	30 May 1926	19 June 1926	20 days	—	Independent	1st Dict.	José Mendes Cabeçadas (1926)
	Manuel Gomes da Costa (1863–1929)	19 June 1926	9 July 1926	20 days	—	Independent	2nd Dict.	Manuel Gomes da Costa (1926)
	António Óscar Carmona (1869–1951)	9 July 1926	18 April 1928	1 year, 284 days	—	Independent	3rd Dict.	António Óscar Carmona (1926–1951)
	José Vicente de Freitas (1869–1952)	18 April 1928	8 July 1929	1 year, 81 days	—	Independent	4th Dict.	António Óscar Carmona (1926–1951)
	José Vicente de Freitas (1869–1952)	18 April 1928	8 July 1929	1 year, 81 days	—	Independent	5th Dict.	António Óscar Carmona (1926–1951)
	Artur Ivens Ferraz (1870–1933)	8 July 1929	21 January 1930	197 days	—	Independent	6th Dict.	António Óscar Carmona (1926–1951)
	Domingos Oliveira (1873–1957)	21 January 1930	5 July 1932	2 years, 166 days	—	National Union	7th Dict.	António Óscar Carmona (1926–1951)
Estado Novo – New State (1932–1974)								António Óscar Carmona (1926–1951)
	António de Oliveira Salazar (1889–1970)	5 July 1932	25 September 1968	36 years, 82 days	—	National Union	8th Dict.	António Óscar Carmona (1926–1951)
	António de Oliveira Salazar (1889–1970)	5 July 1932	25 September 1968	36 years, 82 days	1934	National Union	9th Dict.	António Óscar Carmona (1926–1951)
	António de Oliveira Salazar (1889–1970)	5 July 1932	25 September 1968	36 years, 82 days	1934	National Union	10th Dict.	António Óscar Carmona (1926–1951)
	António de Oliveira Salazar (1889–1970)	5 July 1932	25 September 1968	36 years, 82 days	1938	National Union	10th Dict.	António Óscar Carmona (1926–1951)
	António de Oliveira Salazar (1889–1970)	5 July 1932	25 September 1968	36 years, 82 days	1942	National Union	10th Dict.	António Óscar Carmona (1926–1951)
	António de Oliveira Salazar (1889–1970)	5 July 1932	25 September 1968	36 years, 82 days	1945	National Union	10th Dict.	António Óscar Carmona (1926–1951)
	António de Oliveira Salazar (1889–1970)	5 July 1932	25 September 1968	36 years, 82 days	1949	National Union	10th Dict.	Francisco Craveiro Lopes (1951–1958)
	António de Oliveira Salazar (1889–1970)	5 July 1932	25 September 1968	36 years, 82 days	1953	National Union	10th Dict.	Francisco Craveiro Lopes (1951–1958)
	António de Oliveira Salazar (1889–1970)	5 July 1932	25 September 1968	36 years, 82 days	1957	National Union	10th Dict.	Américo Tomás (1958–1974)
	António de Oliveira Salazar (1889–1970)	5 July 1932	25 September 1968	36 years, 82 days	1961	National Union	10th Dict.	Américo Tomás (1958–1974)
	António de Oliveira Salazar (1889–1970)	5 July 1932	25 September 1968	36 years, 82 days	1965	National Union	10th Dict.	Américo Tomás (1958–1974)
	Marcello Caetano (1906–1980)	25 September 1968	25 April 1974	5 years, 210 days	—	National Union from 1970; People's National Action	11th Dict.	Américo Tomás (1958–1974)
	Marcello Caetano (1906–1980)	25 September 1968	25 April 1974	5 years, 210 days	1969	National Union from 1970; People's National Action	11th Dict.	Américo Tomás (1958–1974)
	Marcello Caetano (1906–1980)	25 September 1968	25 April 1974	5 years, 210 days	1973	National Union from 1970; People's National Action	11th Dict.	Américo Tomás (1958–1974)

=== Third Republic (1974–present) ===
Portrait	Prime minister (Lifespan)	Term of office			Election	Party	Government	President (Mandate)
Portrait	Prime minister (Lifespan)	Start	End	Duration	Election	Party	Government	President (Mandate)
Provisional Governments of the Revolutionary Period (1974–1976)
National Salvation Junta composed of: António de Spínola, Francisco Costa Gomes, Jaime Silvério Marques, Diogo Neto, Carlos Galvão de Melo, José Pinheiro de Azevedo, Rosa Countinho		25 April 1974	16 May 1974	21 days	—	Independent	—	António de Spínola (1974)
	Adelino da Palma Carlos (1905–1992)	16 May 1974	18 July 1974	63 days	—	Independent	Prov. I	António de Spínola (1974)
	Vasco Gonçalves (1921–2005)	18 July 1974	19 September 1975	1 year, 63 days	—	Independent	Prov. II	António de Spínola (1974)
	Vasco Gonçalves (1921–2005)	18 July 1974	19 September 1975	1 year, 63 days	—	Independent	Prov. III	Francisco da Costa Gomes (1974–1976)
	Vasco Gonçalves (1921–2005)	18 July 1974	19 September 1975	1 year, 63 days	C. 1975	Independent	Prov. IV	Francisco da Costa Gomes (1974–1976)
	Vasco Gonçalves (1921–2005)	18 July 1974	19 September 1975	1 year, 63 days	—	Independent	Prov. V	Francisco da Costa Gomes (1974–1976)
	José Pinheiro de Azevedo (1917–1983)	19 September 1975	23 June 1976	278 days	—	Independent	Prov. VI	Francisco da Costa Gomes (1974–1976)
	Vasco de Almeida e Costa (1932–2010) interim	23 June 1976	23 July 1976	30 days	—	Independent	Prov. VI	Francisco da Costa Gomes (1974–1976)
Prime Ministers heading Constitutional Governments (1976–present)
	Mário Soares (1924–2017)	23 July 1976	28 August 1978	2 years, 37 days	1976	Socialist	I^{[Min.]}	António Ramalho Eanes (1976–1986)
	Mário Soares (1924–2017)	23 July 1976	28 August 1978	2 years, 37 days	—	Socialist	II (Note: Socialist Party (PS) and Democratic and Social Centre (CDS) coalition government.)	António Ramalho Eanes (1976–1986)
	Alfredo Nobre da Costa (1923–1996)	28 August 1978	22 November 1978	86 days	—	Independent	III	António Ramalho Eanes (1976–1986)
	Carlos Mota Pinto (1936–1985)	22 November 1978	1 August 1979	252 days	—	Independent	IV	António Ramalho Eanes (1976–1986)
	Maria de Lourdes Pintasilgo (1930–2004)	1 August 1979	3 January 1980	155 days	—	Independent	V	António Ramalho Eanes (1976–1986)
	Francisco de Sá Carneiro (1934–1980)	3 January 1980	4 December 1980 (died)	336 days	1979	Social Democratic	VI (Note: Democratic Alliance (AD) government, composed by the Social Democratic Party (PSD), Democratic and Social Centre (CDS) and the People's Monarchist Party (PPM).)	António Ramalho Eanes (1976–1986)
	Francisco de Sá Carneiro (1934–1980)	3 January 1980	4 December 1980 (died)	336 days	1980	Social Democratic	VI	António Ramalho Eanes (1976–1986)
	Diogo Freitas do Amaral (1941–2019) interim	4 December 1980	9 January 1981	36 days	—	Democratic and Social Centre	VI	António Ramalho Eanes (1976–1986)
	Francisco Pinto Balsemão (1937–2025)	9 January 1981	9 June 1983	2 years, 151 days	—	Social Democratic	VII	António Ramalho Eanes (1976–1986)
	Francisco Pinto Balsemão (1937–2025)	9 January 1981	9 June 1983	2 years, 151 days	—	Social Democratic	VIII	António Ramalho Eanes (1976–1986)
	Mário Soares (1924–2017) (2nd time)	9 June 1983	6 November 1985	2 years, 151 days	1983	Socialist	IX (Note: Socialist Party (PS) and the Social Democratic Party (PSD) coalition government.)	António Ramalho Eanes (1976–1986)
	Aníbal Cavaco Silva (born 1939)	6 November 1985	28 October 1995	9 years, 356 days	1985	Social Democratic	X^{[Min.]}	António Ramalho Eanes (1976–1986)
	Aníbal Cavaco Silva (born 1939)	6 November 1985	28 October 1995	9 years, 356 days	1987	Social Democratic	XI	Mário Soares (1986–1996)
	Aníbal Cavaco Silva (born 1939)	6 November 1985	28 October 1995	9 years, 356 days	1991	Social Democratic	XII	Mário Soares (1986–1996)
	António Guterres (born 1949)	28 October 1995	6 April 2002	6 years, 160 days	1995	Socialist	XIII^{[Min.]}	Mário Soares (1986–1996)
	António Guterres (born 1949)	28 October 1995	6 April 2002	6 years, 160 days	1999	Socialist	XIV^{[Min.]}	Jorge Sampaio (1996–2006)
	José Manuel Durão Barroso (born 1956)	6 April 2002	17 July 2004	2 years, 102 days	2002	Social Democratic	XV (Note: Social Democratic Party (PSD) and CDS – People's Party (CDS–PP) coalition government.)	Jorge Sampaio (1996–2006)
	Pedro Santana Lopes (born 1956)	17 July 2004	12 March 2005	238 days	—	Social Democratic	XVI (Note: Social Democratic Party (PSD) and CDS – People's Party (CDS–PP) coalition government.)	Jorge Sampaio (1996–2006)
	José Sócrates (born 1957)	12 March 2005	21 June 2011	6 years, 101 days	2005	Socialist	XVII	Jorge Sampaio (1996–2006)
	José Sócrates (born 1957)	12 March 2005	21 June 2011	6 years, 101 days	2009	Socialist	XVIII^{[Min.]}	Aníbal Cavaco Silva (2006–2016)
	Pedro Passos Coelho (born 1964)	21 June 2011	26 November 2015	4 years, 158 days	2011	Social Democratic	XIX (Note: Social Democratic Party (PSD) and CDS – People's Party (CDS–PP) coalition government.)	Aníbal Cavaco Silva (2006–2016)
	Pedro Passos Coelho (born 1964)	21 June 2011	26 November 2015	4 years, 158 days	2015	Social Democratic	XX^{[Min.]} (Note: Portugal Ahead (PàF) government, composed by the Social Democratic Party (PSD) and CDS – People's Party (CDS–PP).)	Aníbal Cavaco Silva (2006–2016)
	António Costa (born 1961)	26 November 2015	2 April 2024	8 years, 128 days	—	Socialist	XXI^{[Min.]}	Aníbal Cavaco Silva (2006–2016)
	António Costa (born 1961)	26 November 2015	2 April 2024	8 years, 128 days	2019	Socialist	XXII^{[Min.]}	Marcelo Rebelo de Sousa (2016–2026)
	António Costa (born 1961)	26 November 2015	2 April 2024	8 years, 128 days	2022	Socialist	XXIII	Marcelo Rebelo de Sousa (2016–2026)
	Luís Montenegro (born 1973)	2 April 2024	Incumbent	2 years, 222 days	2024	Social Democratic	XXIV^{[Min.]} (Note: Democratic Alliance (AD) government, composed by the Social Democratic Party (PSD) and CDS – People's Party (CDS–PP).)	Marcelo Rebelo de Sousa (2016–2026)
	Luís Montenegro (born 1973)	2 April 2024	Incumbent	2 years, 222 days	2025	Social Democratic	XXV^{[Min.]}	António José Seguro (2026–present)

== See also ==
- List of prime ministers of Portugal by time in office
- List of presidents of Portugal
- Politics of Portugal

== Notes ==
^{Min.} Minority government
