= Democratic Party (Portugal) =

Political party in Portugal

Democratic Party Partido Democrático
- Abbreviation: PD
- Leader: Afonso Costa
- Founded: 1912; 114 years ago
- Banned: 3 June 1926; 99 years ago
- Preceded by: Portuguese Republican Party
- Ideology: Republicanism; Social-democracy; Radicalism; Anticlericalism; Factions; Socialism
- Political position: Centre-left
- Colors: Red and Green
- Seats in Chamber of Deputies: 106 / 163 (1915-1917, peak)
- Seats in the Senate: 45 / 68 (1915-1917, peak)

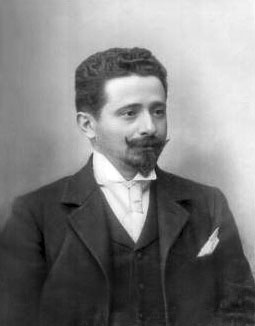
Afonso Costa, the influential leader of the Democratic Party.

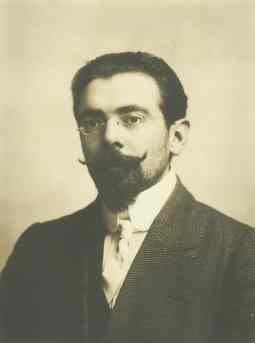
António Maria da Silva

The Democratic Party (Portuguese: Partido Democrático, pronounced [pɐɾˈtiðu ðɨmuˈkɾatiku]), officially known as the Portuguese Republican Party (Portuguese: Partido Republicano Português [pɐɾˈtiðu ʁɛpuβliˈkɐnu puɾtuˈɣeʃ]), was a Portuguese centre-left political party during the Portuguese First Republic. It was also the successor to the original Portuguese Republican Party, which had been behind the 5 October 1910 revolution that established the Portuguese First Republic.

The name "Democratic Party" was never the official name of the party, as the Portuguese Republican Party never ceased to exist. However, the party was de facto different and thus the other parties (that belonged to the PRP before 1910) used the new expression to assert their opposition to the claim of continuation of the PRP by Afonso Costa, the first leader of the Democratic Party. Other names were given to the members of the Democratic Party, like the Afonsists, named after Afonso Costa.

== History ==
When the Republican Evolutionist Party (Evolutionists) and Republican Union (Unionists) seceded from the Portuguese Republican Party in February 1912, the Democratic Party declared itself the latter party's heir. It soon controlled its electoral and propagandistic structure, a fact that would influence the dominance of the Democratic Party during the First Republic.

During the First Republic, the Democratic Party, led by Afonso Costa, managed to hold power despite suffering several revolutionary attempts, both monarchist and republican. Although some of the coups partially succeeded (Monarchy of the North, Joaquim Pimenta de Castro, Sidónio Pais) the Democratic Party always managed to retain power.

During World War I, in which Portugal participated, the party entered a coalition government with the Evolutionist Party called "União Sagrada" (Sacred Union), to face the problems of the war. Following the war, discontent grew and the union was eventually dissolved. Sidónio took advantage of this and established a dictatorial government of his National Republican Party. Sidónio Pais was assassinated 14 December 1918. By 1919 the Democratic Party was again in power.

After 1919, with Afonso Costa in Paris, the party was led by António Maria da Silva. In the next phase of the party's existence, political, popular and trade union opposition created a climate of constant revolt. Groups also seceded from the party, with the creation of the Reconstitution Party, on the right, and the Democratic Left Republican Party and the Reformist Party, both on the left.

After the 28 May 1926 coup d'état, the party was banned on the 3 June 1926. Some factions led by Afonso Costa later founded the League for the Defense of the Republic.

== Relations with the Republic ==
The identification of the First Republic with the Democratic Party was so close, as the party dominated all political life between 1911 and 1926, that Marcelo Rebelo de Sousa described it as a "multi-party system with a dominant party" and historian Fernando Rosas called it a "political monopoly" and a "democratic dictatorship".

== Prime ministers ==
- Augusto de Vasconcelos (1911–1912)
- Duarte Leite (1912–1913)
- Afonso Costa (1913–1914; 1915–1916; 1917 — in coalition with the Evolutionists [Sacred Union])
- Bernardino Machado (1914; 1921)
- Victor Hugo de Azevedo Coutinho (1914–1915)
- António José de Almeida — Evolutionists in coalition ([Sacred Union]) — (1916–1917)
- José Relvas (1919)
- Domingos Pereira (1919; 1920; 1925)
- Alfredo de Sá Cardoso (1919–1920; 1920)
- António Maria Baptista (1920)
- José Ramos Preto (1920)
- António Maria da Silva (1920; 1922–1923; 1925; 1925–1926)
- Liberato Pinto (1920–1921)
- Alfredo Rodrigues Gaspar (1924)
- Vitorino Guimarães (1925)

== Presidents of the Republic ==
- Manuel de Arriaga (1911–1915)
- Teófilo Braga (1915)
- Bernardino Machado (1915–1918; 1925–1926)
- Manuel Teixeira Gomes (1923–1925)

== See also ==
- Politics of Portugal
- History of Portugal
  - History of Portugal (1834–1910)
  - History of Portugal (1910–1926)
  - History of Portugal (1926–1974)
  - 5 October 1910 revolution
  - 28 May 1926 revolution
- Timeline of Portuguese history
- List of political parties in Portugal
- List of presidents of Portugal
- List of prime ministers of Portugal
