= Francisco José Fernandes Costa =

Portuguese politician

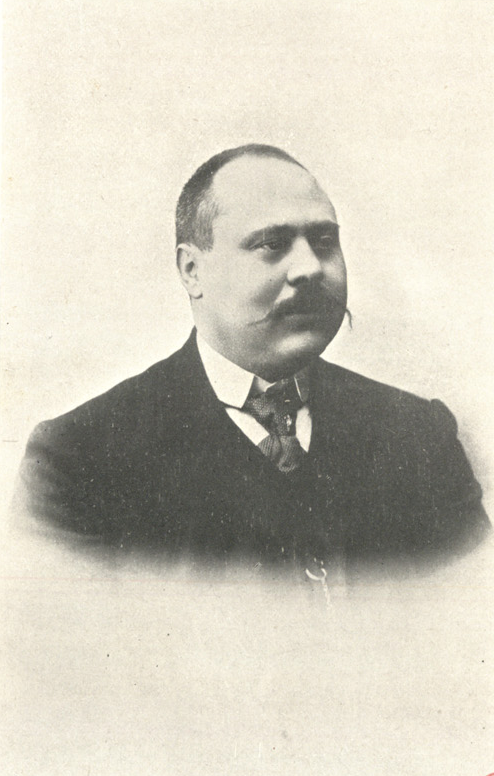

Minister for the Navy
- In office 16 June 1912 – 9 January 1913
- Prime Minister: Duarte Leite
- Preceded by: Celestino Germano Pais de Almeida
- Succeeded by: José de Freitas Ribeiro

Minister for Foment
- In office 17 March 1916 – 25 April 1917
- Prime Minister: António José de Almeida
- Preceded by: António Maria da Silva
- Succeeded by: Herculano Jorge Galhardo

Minister for the Navy
- In office 15 May 1915 – 17 May 1915
- Prime Minister: João Chagas
- Preceded by: José Joaquim Xavier de Brito
- Succeeded by: José de Castro

Prime Minister of Portugal (but did not take office)
- In office 15 January 1920 – 15 January 1920
- President: António José de Almeida
- Preceded by: Alfredo de Sá Cardoso
- Succeeded by: Alfredo de Sá Cardoso (reconducted)

Minister of Finance (but did not take office)
- In office 15 January 1920 – 15 January 1920
- Prime Minister: Himself
- Preceded by: António Maria da Silva
- Succeeded by: António Maria da Silva (reconducted)

Minister for Foreign Affairs (but did not take office)
- In office 15 January 1920 – 15 January 1920
- Prime Minister: Himself
- Preceded by: João Carlos de Melo Barreto
- Succeeded by: João Carlos de Melo Barreto (reconducted)

Minister for Commerce
- In office 10 August 1921 – 19 October 1921
- Prime Minister: Tomé de Barros Queirós (10 August 1921–30 August 1921); António Granjo (30 August 1921–19 October 1921)
- Preceded by: António Granjo
- Succeeded by: António Pires de Carvalho

Minister for Agriculture (interim)
- In office 30 August 1921 – 3 September 1921
- Prime Minister: António Granjo
- Preceded by: Manuel de Sousa da Câmara
- Succeeded by: Alboim Inglês

Personal details
- Born: 19 April 1867 Foz de Arouce, Lousã, Kingdom of Portugal
- Died: 19 July 1925 (aged 58) Figueira da Foz, Portuguese Republic
- Party: Portuguese Republican Party (later Evolutionist Party, Republican Liberal Party and Nationalist Republican Party)
- Spouse: Maria Adelaide Borges de Menezes Parreira
- Children: Francisco José, João, Manuel, Leopoldina, Maria, Adelaide
- Education: University of Coimbra
- Occupation: Lawyer, jurist and high school teacher

Francisco José Fernandes Costa (Portuguese: [fɾɐ̃ˈsiʃku ʒuˈzɛ fɨɾˈnɐ̃dɨʃ ˈkɔʃtɐ]; 1867–1925) was a Portuguese lawyer and politician. He was a member of the Portuguese Republican Party and later of the Evolutionist Party, the Republican Liberal Party and the Nationalist Party. He was civil governor of Coimbra, minister of the Navy (1912–1913; 1915) and Commerce (1921). He is most remembered for being the President of the Ministry (Prime Minister) of the short-lived "five minutes government", who resigned the same day it was to take office, on 15 January 1920.

Political offices
| Preceded by Alfredo de Sá Cardoso | Prime Minister of Portugal (President of the Ministry); 1920 | Succeeded by Alfredo de Sá Cardoso |
