= António Maria Baptista =

Portuguese military officer and politician

General António Maria Baptista
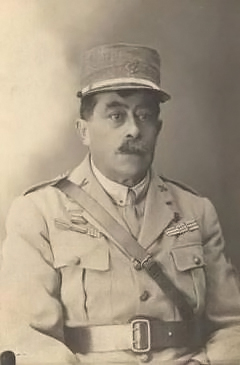
- Baptista in 1920

Prime Minister of Portugal
- In office 8 March 1920 – 6 June 1920
- President: António José de Almeida
- Preceded by: Domingos Pereira
- Succeeded by: José Ramos Preto

Minister of War of Portugal
- In office 1 April – 29 July 1919
- President: João do Canto e Castro
- Prime Minister: Domingos Pereira; Alfredo de Sá Cardoso
- Preceded by: Jorge de Vasconcelos Nunes (as interim)
- Succeeded by: Hélder Ribeiro

Minister of Interior of Portugal
- Interim; 20 April – 28 April 1919
- President: João do Canto e Castro
- Prime Minister: Domingos Pereira
- Preceded by: Domingos Pereira
- Succeeded by: Domingos Pereira
- In office 8 March – 6 June 1920
- President: António José de Almeida
- Prime Minister: Himself
- Preceded by: Domingos Pereira
- Succeeded by: José Ramos Preto

Personal details
- Born: 5 January 1866 Beja, Portugal
- Died: 6 June 1920 (aged 54) Lisbon, Portugal
- Party: Democratic Party
- Occupation: Army officer (General)

Military service
- Allegiance: Kingdom of Portugal; Portugal
- Branch/service: (Kingdom of Portugal) (Portugal) Portuguese Army
- Years of service: 1884–1919
- Rank: General
- Battles/wars: Portuguese campaigns of pacification and occupation WW1

António Maria Baptista GCTE (European Portuguese pronunciation: [ɐ̃ˈtɔni.u mɐˈɾi.ɐ βaˈtiʃtɐ, ɐ̃ˈtɔnju -]; 5 January 1866 – 6 June 1920) was a Portuguese military officer and politician.

When he was lieutenant, he fought in Portuguese Mozambique, during the wars of pacification against the Vátuas, led by Gungunhana. He was promoted to colonel in 1917. He fought the monarchist uprising of 1919, and was nominated Minister of War in the same year. He, then, distinguished himself during a series of violent strikes, and a year later was nominated and became President of the Ministry (Prime Minister), on 8 March 1920. He died suddenly while in office, after a Council of Ministers reunion, on 6 June 1920.

He was posthumously promoted to general. He was decorated with the Grand Cross of the Order of the Tower and Sword on 3 June 1920.

Political offices
Preceded by Domingos Leite Pereira	Prime Minister of Portugal (President of the Ministry); 1920	Succeeded by António Maria da Silva
