= Alfredo Rodrigues Gaspar =

Portuguese politician

Captain of Sea and War Alfredo Rodrigues Gaspar GCC GOA ComA
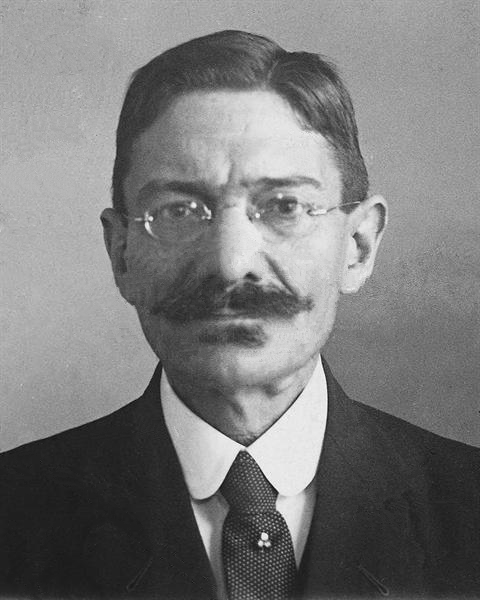

Prime Minister of Portugal
- In office 7 July 1924 – 22 November 1924
- President: Manuel Teixeira Gomes
- Preceded by: Álvaro de Castro
- Succeeded by: José Domingues dos Santos

Minister of the Colonies of Portugal
- In office 12 December 1914 – 25 January 1915
- President: Manuel de Arriaga
- Prime Minister: Victor Hugo de Azevedo Coutinho
- Preceded by: Alfredo Augusto Lisboa de Lima
- Succeeded by: Joaquim Pimenta de Castro
- In office 22 July 1915 – 15 March 1916
- President: Manuel de Arriaga; Teófilo Braga; Bernardino Machado
- Prime Minister: José de Castro; Afonso Costa
- Preceded by: José Norton de Matos
- Succeeded by: António José de Almeida
- In office 29 June 1919 – 3 January 1920
- President: António José de Almeida
- Prime Minister: Alfredo de Sá Cardoso
- Preceded by: João Lopes Soares
- Succeeded by: Alfredo de Sá Cardoso (as interim)
- In office 6 February 1922 – 15 November 1923
- President: António José de Almeida
- Prime Minister: António Maria da Silva
- Preceded by: Francisco Rego Chaves
- Succeeded by: António Vicente Ferreira

Minister of the Navy of Portugal
- Interim; 29 June – 7 July 1919
- President: João do Canto e Castro
- Prime Minister: Alfredo de Sá Cardoso
- Preceded by: Vítor Macedo Pinto
- Succeeded by: Silvério da Rocha e Cunha

Minister of Agriculture of Portugal
- Interim; 7 July – 22 July 1924
- President: Manuel Teixeira Gomes
- Prime Minister: Himself
- Preceded by: Joaquim Ribeiro
- Succeeded by: António Alberto Torres Garcia

Minister of the Interior of Portugal
- In office 7 July – 22 November 1924
- President: Manuel Teixeira Gomes
- Prime Minister: Himself
- Preceded by: Alfredo de Sá Cardoso
- Succeeded by: José Domingues dos Santos

Personal details
- Born: 8 August 1865 Funchal, Portugal
- Died: 30 November 1938 (aged 73) Lisbon, Portugal
- Spouse: Carolina Maria Saavedre
- Parent(s): Manuel Rodrigues Gaspar (father); Maria Augusta (mother)

Military service
- Allegiance: Kingdom of Portugal; Portugal
- Branch/service: Portuguese Navy
- Years of service: 1880s–1938
- Rank: Captain of Sea and War

Alfredo Rodrigues Gaspar (8 December 1865 – 1 December 1938) was a Portuguese military officer and politician. Rodrigues Gaspar was President of the Ministry (Prime Minister) of one of the many governments of the Portuguese First Republic.

== Biography ==
He was born on 8 August 1865 in the Penha de França neighbourhood, in what is today's freguesia of Sé, in Funchal, to Manuel Rodrigues Gaspar, a carpenter and Maria Augusta.

He was President of the Council of Ministers (Prime-Minister) in one of the First Portuguese Republic's many governments, between 6 July 1924 and 22 November 1924. He was also Minister of Agriculture between 6 and 22 July 1924.

The political instability of the First Republic would make him take the positions of Minister of Education, Minister of the Colonies and last President of the Chamber of Deputies. He was also teacher at the Naval School.

At the time of his death, on 30 November 1938, he was director of the Navy's Explosives Laboratory and president of the Technical Commission of Naval Artillery, holding the post retired Captain.

He was married to Carolina Maria Saavedre, sister of Tomás Óscar Pinto da Cunha Saavedra, Baron of Saavedra.

== Honours ==
=== National orders ===
- Commander of the Order of Aviz, (11 March 1919)
- Grad-Officer of the Order of Aviz (19 October 1920)
- Grand-Cross of the Order of Christ (24 June 1932)

Political offices
Preceded by Álvaro de Castro	Prime Minister of Portugal (President of the Ministry); 1924	Succeeded by José Domingues dos Santos
