= Liberato Pinto =

Portuguese Lieutenant Colonel and politician

Colonel Liberato Pinto
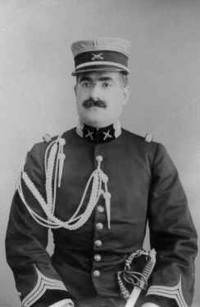

Prime Minister of Portugal
- In office 30 November 1920 – 2 March 1921
- President: António José de Almeida
- Preceded by: Álvaro de Castro
- Succeeded by: Bernardino Machado

Minister of the Interior of Portugal
- In office 30 November 1920 – 2 March 1921
- President: António José de Almeida
- Prime Minister: Himself
- Preceded by: Álvaro de Castro
- Succeeded by: Bernardino Machado

Minister of the Navy of Portugal
- Interim; 4 February – 2 March 1921
- President: António José de Almeida
- Prime Minister: Himself
- Preceded by: Júlio Martins
- Succeeded by: Fernando Brederode

Minister of Finance of Portugal
- Interim; 4 February – 2 March 1921
- President: António José de Almeida
- Prime Minister: Himself
- Preceded by: Francisco Cunha Leal
- Succeeded by: António Maria da Silva

Personal details
- Born: 29 September 1880 Lisbon, Portugal
- Died: 4 September 1949 (aged 68) Lisbon, Portugal
- Party: Democratic Party
- Spouse: Maria Augusta Supico
- Children: Clotário Luís Supico Ribeiro Pinto
- Parent(s): Manuel Marques da Silva Pinto (father); Júlia Carolina Ribeiro Pinto (mother)
- Occupation: Military officer (National Republican Guard)

Military service
- Allegiance: Kingdom of Portugal; Portugal
- Branch/service: Portuguese Army; National Republican Guard
- Years of service: 1899–1938
- Rank: Colonel

Liberato Damião Ribeiro Pinto ComTE, ComC, ComA, ComSE, (Lisbon, 29 September 1880 – Lisbon, 4 August 1949) was a Portuguese Lieutenant Colonel of the Republican National Guard (Guarda Nacional Republicana, GNR), politician and President of the Ministry (Prime Minister) of one of the governments of the Portuguese First Republic. He was the Portuguese head of government for a short time from 1920 to 1921 and the 44th Minister of Finance of Portugal from 22 February 1921 until 2 March 1921.

He married Maria Augusta Supico and had a son Minister Clotário Luís Supico Ribeiro Pinto (1909-1986), 937th Associate of the Second Tauromachic Club, married on 4 April 1945 to Cecília Maria de Castro Pereira de Carvalho (born Lisbon, Mártires, 30 May 1921), of the Viscounts (formerly Barons) of Chanceleiros, who became celebrated for her radio support to the troops of the Portuguese Colonial War, without issue, and had a natural daughter by actress Maria Adelaide da Silva Lalande (Castelo Branco, Salgueiro do Campo, 7 November 1913 - Lisbon, 21 March 1968), wife of actor Ribeirinho.

Political offices
Preceded by Álvaro de Castro	Prime Minister of Portugal (President of the Ministry); 1920–1921	Succeeded by Bernardino Machado
