= Domingos Pereira =

Portuguese politician

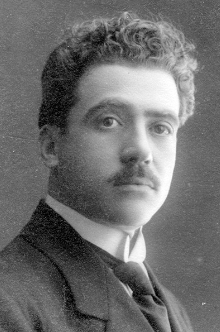

Prime Minister of Portugal
- In office 1 August 1925 – 17 December 1925
- President: Manuel Teixeira Gomes
- Preceded by: António Maria da Silva
- Succeeded by: António Maria da Silva
- In office 21 January 1920 – 8 March 1920
- President: António José de Almeida
- Preceded by: Alfredo de Sá Cardoso
- Succeeded by: António Maria Baptista
- In office 30 March 1919 – 29 June 1919
- President: João do Canto e Castro
- Preceded by: José Relvas
- Succeeded by: Alfredo de Sá Cardoso

Personal details
- Born: 19 September 1880 Braga, Kingdom of Portugal
- Died: 27 October 1956 (aged 76) Porto, Portugal
- Party: Democratic Party
- Education: University of Coimbra

Domingos Leite Pereira (Portuguese: [duˈmĩɡuʒ ˈlɐjtɨ pɨˈɾɐjɾɐ]; 19 September 1880 – 27 October 1956) was a Portuguese politician of the Portuguese First Republic. He had degrees in theology and literature of the University of Coimbra. He helped to improve the relationships between the republic and the Catholic Church during his government.

During his life he served in many political posts:

- President of the Municipal Chamber of Braga;
- Deputy in the constituent assembly, for the Democratic Party;
- President of the Chamber of Deputies;
- Minister of Public Instruction in the government of José Relvas in 1919;
- Prime Minister (President of the Ministry) for three times: from 30 March to 29 June 1919, from 21 January to 8 March 1920 and from 1 August to 17 December 1925;
- Minister of Foreign Affairs in various governments: in those of Álvaro de Castro (from 20 to 30 November 1920), Liberato Pinto (from 30 November 1920 to 2 March 1921), Bernardino Machado (2 March to 23 May 1921), António Maria da Silva (30 November 1922 to 15 November 1923) and, again, Álvaro de Castro (18 December 1923 to 6 July 1924).

After the 28 May 1926 revolution that installed the Ditadura Nacional (National Dictatorship) that would be followed by António de Oliveira Salazar's fascist Estado Novo (New State) regime, he abandoned his political life. Until the end of his life in 1956, he served as President of the insurance company Douro.

Political offices
Preceded by José Relvas	Prime Minister of Portugal (President of the Ministry); 1919	Succeeded by Alfredo de Sá Cardoso
Preceded by Alfredo de Sá Cardoso	Prime Minister of Portugal (President of the Ministry); 1920	Succeeded by António Maria Baptista
Preceded by António Maria da Silva	Prime Minister of Portugal (President of the Ministry); 1925	Succeeded by António Maria da Silva
