= Álvaro de Castro =

Prime Minister of Portugal (1878–1928)

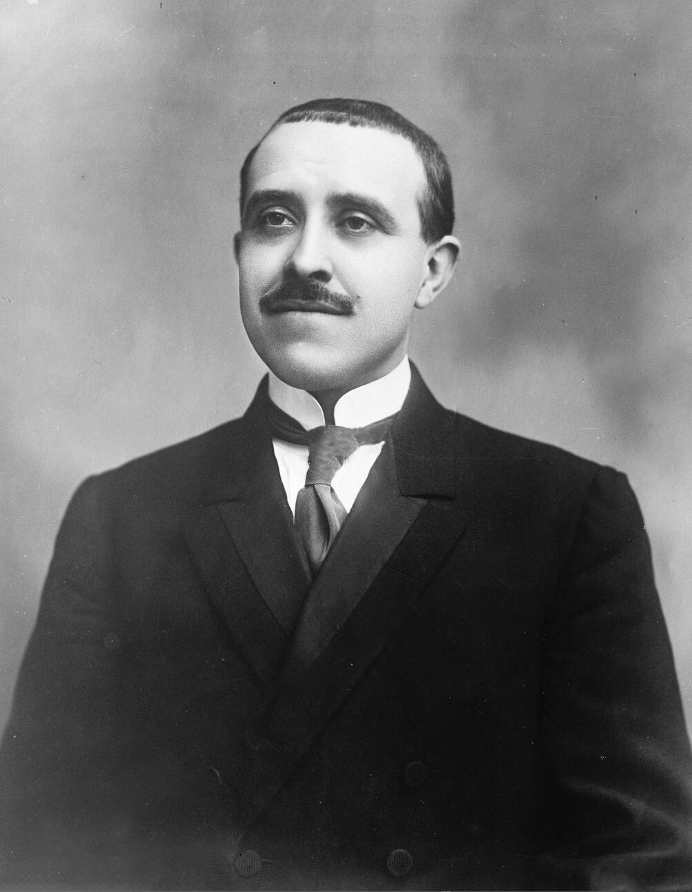

Prime Minister of Portugal
- In office 18 December 1923 – 7 July 1924
- President: Manuel Teixeira Gomes
- Preceded by: António Ginestal Machado
- Succeeded by: Alfredo Rodrigues Gaspar
- In office 20 November 1920 – 30 November 1920
- President: António José de Almeida
- Preceded by: António Granjo
- Succeeded by: Liberato Pinto

Personal details
- Born: 9 November 1878 Guarda, Portugal
- Died: 29 June 1928 (aged 49) Coimbra, Portugal
- Party: Republican Liberal Party later Reconstitution Party, and Nationalist Republican Party.
- Spouse: Maria Rosa de Meireles Garrido

Álvaro Xavier de Castro (Portuguese pronunciation: [ˈalvɐɾu ʃɐviˈɛɾ ðɨ ˈkaʃtɾu]) was Prime Minister of Portugal from 20 November to 30 November 1920 and from 18 December 1923 to 6 July 1924.

== Early career ==
De Castro was born in Guarda, on 9 November 1878. He was part of the Constitutional junta that governed Portugal in 1915. He later served as Governor-General of Mozambique between 1915 and 1918. He was a prominent participant in the attempted coup of 11 January 1919 which took place after the assassination of Sidónio Pais.

== Later career ==
De Castro co-founded the National Reconstitution Republican Party. He was appointed Prime Minister, during a brief period (from 20 November to 30 November 1920). He was replaced by Liberato Pinto, an army officer.

He then joined a new party, the Nationalist Republican Party. He again became Prime Minister of Portugal, from 18 December 1923 to 6 July 1924. He died in Coimbra on 29 June 1928.

Political offices
Preceded by Joaquim Pimenta de Castro	Prime Minister of Portugal (President of the Ministry) together with: José Norton de Matos; António Maria da Silva; José de Freitas Ribeiro; Alfredo de Sá Cardoso; 1915	Succeeded by João Chagas (did not take office); José de Castro
Preceded by António Granjo	Prime Minister of Portugal (President of the Ministry); 1920	Succeeded by Liberato Pinto
Preceded by António Ginestal Machado	Prime Minister of Portugal (President of the Ministry); 1923–1924	Succeeded by Alfredo Rodrigues Gaspar
