= João do Canto e Castro =

President of Portugal and Navy officer

His Excellency Admiral João do Canto e Castro
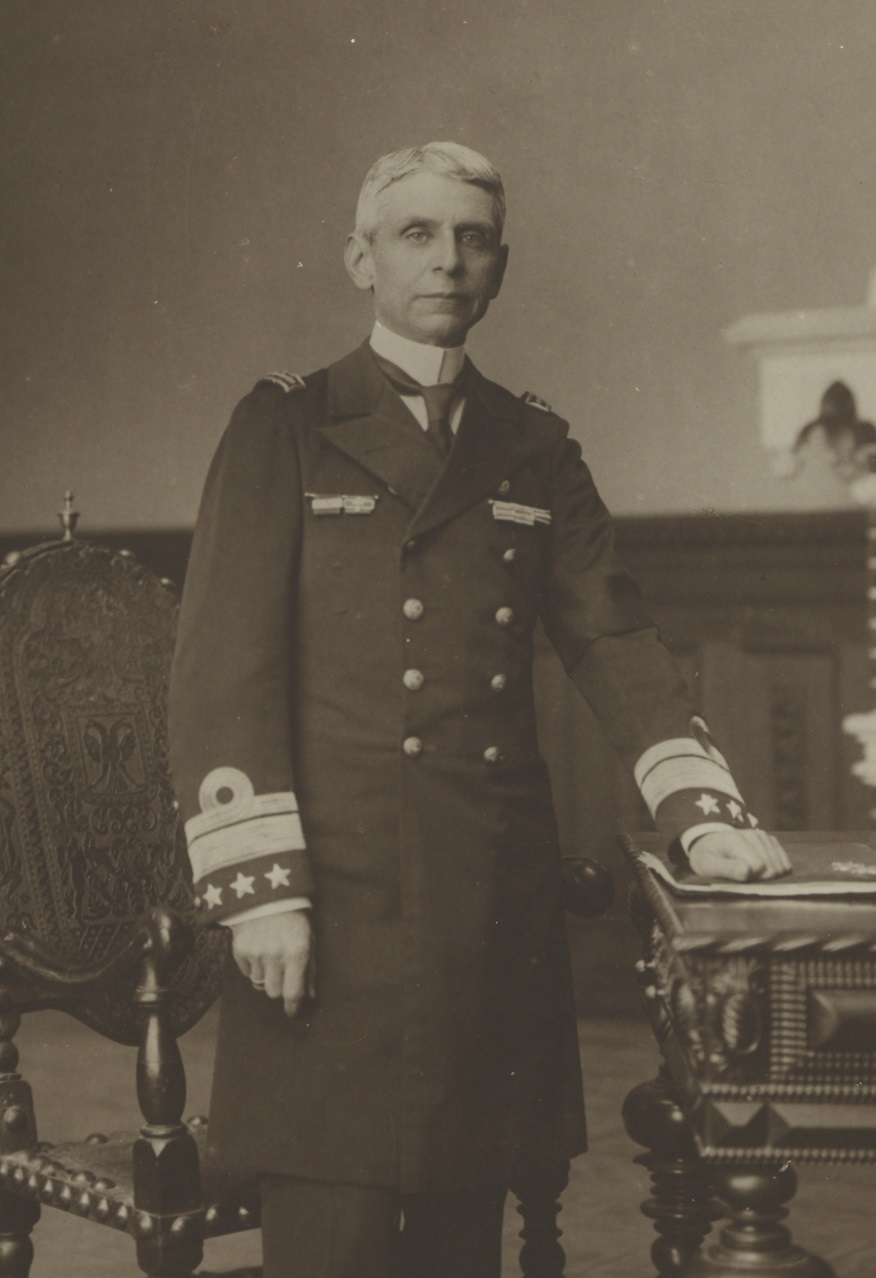
- Official portrait, 1918

President of Portugal
- In office 16 December 1918 – 5 October 1919
- Prime Minister: Himself; João Tamagnini Barbosa; José Relvas; Domingos Pereira; Alfredo de Sá Cardoso
- Preceded by: Sidónio Pais
- Succeeded by: António José de Almeida

Prime Minister of Portugal
- Acting; 14 December 1918 – 23 December 1918
- President: Himself
- Preceded by: Sidónio Pais
- Succeeded by: João Tamagnini Barbosa

Minister of Foreign Affairs of Portugal
- Acting; 4 December 1918 – 15 December 1918
- President: Sidónio Pais
- Prime Minister: Sidónio Pais
- Preceded by: António Egas Moniz
- Succeeded by: António Egas Moniz

Minister of the Navy of Portugal
- In office 7 September 1918 – 15 December 1918
- President: Sidónio Pais
- Prime Minister: Sidónio Pais
- Preceded by: Alfredo Magalhães
- Succeeded by: Alfredo Magalhães

Personal details
- Born: João do Canto e Castro da Silva Antunes; 19 May 1862 Lisbon, Portugal
- Died: 14 March 1934 (aged 71) Lisbon, Portugal
- Party: National Republican Party ("Sidonist Party")
- Spouse: Mariana de Aboim
- Relations: José Ricardo da Costa da Silva Antunes (father); Maria da Conceição do Canto e Castro Mascarenhas Valdez (mother)
- Children: 2 daughters and 1 son
- Occupation: Naval officer

Military service
- Allegiance: Kingdom of Portugal (to 1910); First Portuguese Republic
- Branch/service: Portuguese Navy
- Rank: Admiral

João do Canto e Castro da Silva Antunes (19 May 1862, in Lisbon – 14 March 1934, in Lisbon), commonly known simply as João do Canto e Castro was a Portuguese Navy officer and the president of Portugal during the First Portuguese Republic. He also briefly served as the 67th prime minister of Portugal.

== Early life ==
He was the son of General José Ricardo da Costa da Silva Antunes (Lisbon, 7 February 1831 – 7 August 1906) and wife (m. 1860) Maria da Conceição do Canto e Castro Mascarenhas Valdez (24 October 1825 – Lisbon, 20 April 1892).

In 1891 he married Mariana de Santo António Moreira Freire Correia Manoel Torres de Aboim (Lisbon, 13 June 1865 – 18 January 1946), sister of the 1st Viscount da Idanha and niece of the 1st Viscount de Vila Boim, and had issue.

== Career ==
He occupied the post of Navy Minister, to which he had been appointed by Sidónio Pais, the "President-King" on 9 September 1918, and succeeded Pais after his murder on 14 December 1918.

During his rule there were two attempts to carry out a revolution. The first one, in Santarém, in December 1918, was led by the republicans Francisco da Cunha Leal and Álvaro Xavier de Castro. The second one was monarchist and was perpetrated in January 1919 and organized by Paiva Couceiro, who for some time managed to control the northern part of the country in what was called the Monarchy of the North. Although Canto e Castro was a monarchist, as President of the Republic he had to fight against a movement that defended his own ideals.

== See also ==
- List of presidents of Portugal
- Portuguese First Republic
- History of Portugal
- Timeline of Portuguese history
- Politics of Portugal

Political offices
Preceded by Sidónio Pais	President of Portugal; 1918–1919	Succeeded by António José de Almeida
Preceded by Sidónio Pais	Prime Minister of Portugal; 1918	Succeeded by João Tamagnini Barbosa
