= José Ramos Preto =

Prime Minister of Portugal (1871–1949)

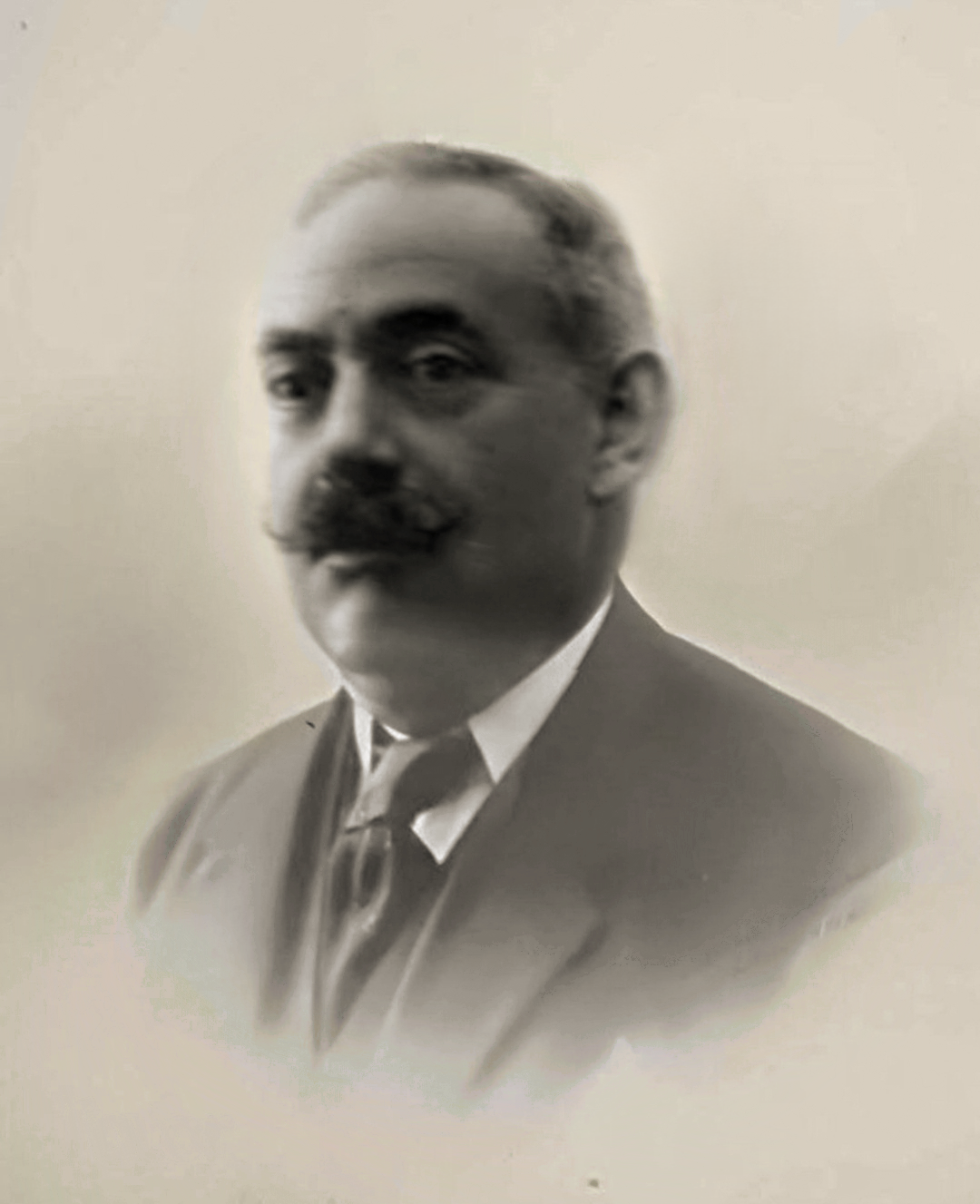

Prime Minister of Portugal
- In office 6 June 1920 – 26 June 1920
- President: António José de Almeida
- Preceded by: António Maria Baptista
- Succeeded by: António Maria da Silva

Personal details
- Born: 23 October 1870 Castelo Branco, Portugal
- Died: 7 January 1949 (aged 78) Castelo Branco, Portugal
- Party: Democratic Party

José Ramos Preto (23 October 1870 – 7 January 1949) was a Portuguese jurist and politician during the Portuguese First Republic. Among other posts, he served as civil governor, senator, minister and president of the Ministry (Prime Minister). He was the main landowner of his native town and the most influential politician of the region of Castelo Branco, the district where he also served as civil governor and director of its secondary schools. He was also elected senator for the electoral circle of Castelo Branco. In the sequence of the sudden death of President of the Ministry António Maria Baptista on 3 June 1920, he was chosen to be his substitute. However, on 18 June, Ramos Preto government was forced to resign by the parliament, after being criticized by increasing the salaries of the members of his ministerial cabinets. Several personalities were then successively invited to constitute a government, but they all declined, making the government of Ramos Preto survive in functions until 26 June, when it was finally substituted by a ministry presided over by António Maria da Silva.

Political offices
Preceded by António Maria Baptista	Prime Minister of Portugal (President of the Ministry); 1920	Succeeded by António Maria da Silva
