= Reformist Party (Portugal) =

Defunct political party in Portugal

The Reformist Party (Portuguese: Partido Reformista) was a Portuguese political party during the Portuguese First Republic, founded in the 1920s by the left wing of the Democratic Party.
