= Alfredo de Sá Cardoso =

Portuguese republican politician

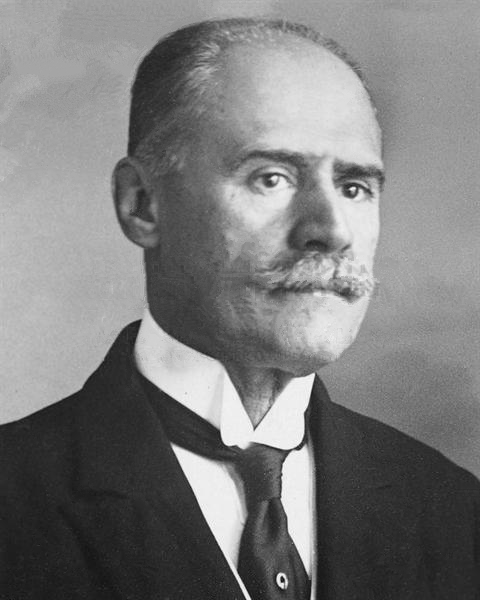

Prime Minister of Portugal
- In office 29 June 1919 – 21 January 1920
- President: António José de Almeida
- Preceded by: Domingos Pereira
- Succeeded by: Domingos Pereira

Personal details
- Born: 6 June 1864 Lisbon, Portugal
- Died: 24 April 1950 (aged 85) Lisbon, Portugal
- Party: Portuguese Republican Party (later Reconstitution Party)
- Occupation: Army officer (General)
- Nickname: Alaíde (masonry)

Alfredo Ernesto de Sá Cardoso (6 June 1864 – 24 April 1950), commonly known as Alfredo de Sá Cardoso (Portuguese pronunciation: [alˈfɾeðu eɾˈnɛʃtu ðɨ ˈsa kɐɾˈðozu]), or just Sá Cardoso, was a Portuguese republican politician of the Portuguese First Republic who served twice as Prime Minister of Portugal.

== Life and politics ==
Born in Lisbon, Sá Cardoso was the son of Adelaide Leopoldina de Sá Cardoso. He entered the Colégio Militar and then the Escola do Exército, where his studies focused on artillery. He became an officer of the army and began a decades-long career that would eventually seem him promoted to the rank of general. In 1888, he was mobilized in the Luanda military campaign, occupying the post of secretary of the district government and governor of the fortress of São Paulo de Luanda, and from 1917 to 1918, he was integrated in the Portuguese Expeditionary Corps. He also served as a vocal of the Council for Ballistic Works.

He became a Freemason in 1893, being initiated in the Portugal Lodge with the symbolic name of Alaíde, ascending to the 33rd degree, and being part of its Supreme Council since 1934.

He was a member of the Portuguese Republican Party, a member of the respective Consultative Junta in 1913, and chief of the party in 1919. He founded the Reconstitution Party with Álvaro de Castro, and served as president of Republican Action, of which he was president. He was an active participant in the republican campaign, since the days of the Portuguese Constitutional Monarchy, taking part in the events of 31 January 1890 and 28 January 1908.

He integrated the Military Committee for the proclamation of the Portuguese Republic and was active in the 1910 revolution. With the republican triumph, he was a cabinet chief of Correia Barreto (1910–1911) and then Civil Governor of the Autonomous District of Funchal 1913–1914. Being a member of the so-called group Jovem Turquia (Young Turkey), he co-organized the 1915 revolutionary movement.

He took part in the resistance against the revolt of Sidónio Pais of 5 December 1917, being imprisoned between 1918 and 1919. In this last years, faithful to his republican beliefs, he participated in the offensive against the Monarchy of the North. He served as deputy, for Viana do Castelo, in 1913, 1915, 1919 and 1922, presiding the Chamber of Deputies in the last.

He became Prime Minister of Portugal on 29 June 1919 and served for almost a year until 15 January 1920. On the same day Francisco José Fernandes Costa was taking office, but due to the political instability of the First Republic, he was forced to resign during the same day (his government was called the "Five Minutes' Government"). Sá Cardoso was invited again to form government and he was Prime Minister again from 16 to 21 January 1920, accumulating the Interior (same period) and Foreign Affairs (from 29 June to 12 July 1919). He would participate in another government (of Álvaro de Castro) occupying the post of Minister of Interior between 18 December 1923 and 6 July 1924.

With the 1926 revolution that installed the Ditadura Nacional, a military dictatorial administration that would be followed by António de Oliveira Salazar's authoritarian Estado Novo, Alfredo de Sá Cardoso was again arrested in 1926, and forced to live in a regime of fixed residence, first in Cape Verde and then in the Azores, between 1927 and 1933.

He returned to mainland Portugal in 1934 to found the Republican and Socialist Alliance. Until the end of his life he refused any political post. He married Gabriela Moreira. He died in Lisbon on 24 April 1950.

Political offices
Preceded by Joaquim Pimenta de Castro	Prime Minister of Portugal (President of the Ministry) together with: José Norton de Matos; António Maria da Silva; José de Freitas Ribeiro; Álvaro de Castro; 1920	Succeeded by João Chagas (didn't take office); José de Castro
Preceded by Domingos Leite Pereira	Prime Minister of Portugal (President of the Ministry); 1919–1920	Succeeded by Francisco José Fernandes Costa
Preceded by Francisco José Fernandes Costa	Prime Minister of Portugal (President of the Ministry); 1920	Succeeded by Domingos Leite Pereira
