= Vitorino Guimarães =

Portuguese economist and politician

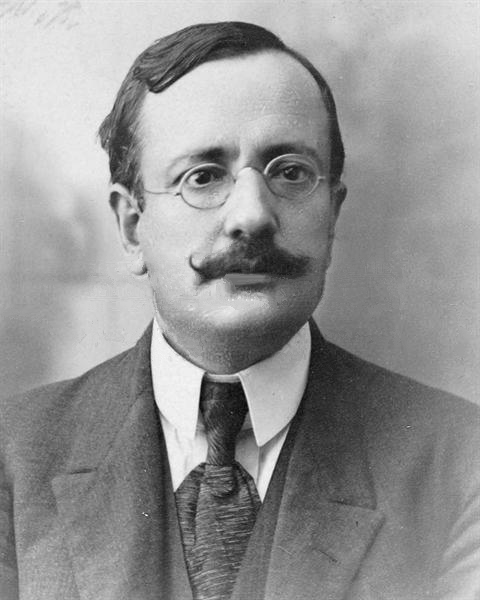

Prime Minister of Portugal
- In office 16 February 1925 – 2 July 1925
- President: Manuel Teixeira Gomes
- Preceded by: José Domingues dos Santos
- Succeeded by: António Maria da Silva

Personal details
- Born: 13 November 1876; Penafiel, Portugal
- Died: 18 October 1957 (aged 80); Lisbon, Portugal
- Political party: Democratic Party

Vitorino Máximo de Carvalho Guimarães (Penafiel, 13 November 1876 – 18 October 1957) was a Portuguese economist and politician. He was the son of João Antunes de Sousa Guimarães and Amélia Augusta de Carvalho. He entered the School of the Army in 1901, graduating as official of military administration and initiating a career that united a passage in the area of the military administration. He integrated committee to after militate bred for the announcement of the Republic and its implantation. In 1911 he was elected member of the house of representatives to the Constituent Congress, for the electoral circle of Bragança. In 1925, he became Prime Minister of one of the governments of First Portuguese Republic.

Political offices
Preceded by José Domingues dos Santos	Prime Minister of Portugal (President of the Ministry); 1925	Succeeded by António Maria da Silva
