= Democratic Leftwing Republican Party =

Political party in Portugal

The Democratic Leftwing Republican Party (Portuguese: Partido Republicano Esquerdista Democrático, PRED) was a political party in Portugal, led by José Domingues dos Santos (a former Prime Minister). It was founded in 1925 by leftwing dissidents of the Portuguese Republican Party. The party won seven parliamentary seats in the November 1925 election. The party existed for about two years.

Followers of the party were generally nicknamed canhotos. This term was used in contrast to the established PRP, whose followers were nicknamed bonzos.
