= José de Freitas Ribeiro =

Portuguese politician

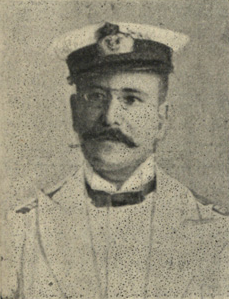
José de Freitas Ribeiro in 1911

José de Freitas Ribeiro, ComTE, ComA (Parede, 23 May 1868 – 3 November 1929) was an official of the Portuguese Navy and a politician during the First Portuguese Republic era who, among other functions, was Minister for the Colonies in the Augusto de Vasconcelos Correia administration and Minister for the Navy in the Afonso Costa administration.

Freitas Ribeiro was a member of the Constitutional Junta of 1915, which served as Prime Minister of Portugal for one day, from 14 May to 15 May 1915. He also served as acting Governor-General of Mozambique from November 1910 to May 1911 and as Governor-General of Portuguese India from 1917 to 1919.
