= José Domingues dos Santos =

Portuguese politician, jurist, professor and journalist

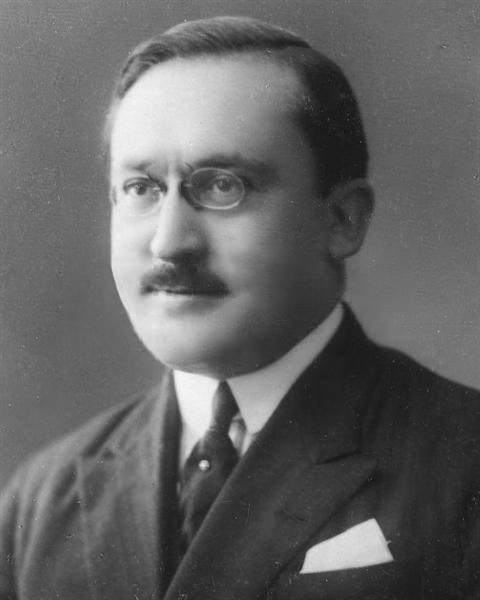

Prime Minister of Portugal
- In office 23 November 1924 – 15 February 1925
- President: Manuel Teixeira Gomes
- Preceded by: Alfredo Rodrigues Gaspar
- Succeeded by: Vitorino Guimarães

Personal details
- Born: 5 August 1885 Matosinhos, Portugal
- Died: 16 August 1958 (aged 73) Porto, Portugal

José Domingues dos Santos (5 August 1885 – 16 August 1958) was a Portuguese politician, jurist, professor and journalist who, among other positions, served as President of the Council of Ministers (Prime Minister) of one of the many governments of the Portuguese First Republic (1924-1925). He was a member of the free masonry, at least since 1922.

Political offices
Preceded by Alfredo Rodrigues Gaspar	Prime Minister of Portugal (President of the Ministry); 1924–1925	Succeeded by Vitorino Guimarães
