= Francisco Cunha Leal =

Portuguese politician

Francisco da Cunha Leal
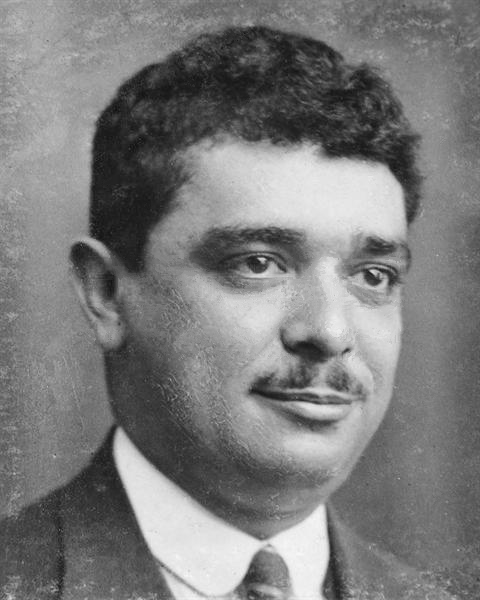

Prime Minister of Portugal
- In office 16 December 1921 – 6 February 1922
- President: António José de Almeida
- Preceded by: Carlos Maia Pinto
- Succeeded by: António Maria da Silva

Personal details
- Born: 22 August 1888 Penamacor, Portugal
- Died: 26 April 1970 (aged 81) Lisbon, Portugal

Francisco Pinto da Cunha Leal (22 August 1888 – 26 April 1970) was a Portuguese politician during the period of the Portuguese First Republic. He served as 84th Prime Minister of Portugal between 1921 and 1922. He was the leader and founder of the União Liberal Republicana (ULR) party.

Preceded by Carlos Maia Pinto	Prime Minister of Portugal (President of the Ministry); 1921–1922	Succeeded by António Maria da Silva
