= António Maria da Silva =

Portuguese politician (1872–1950)

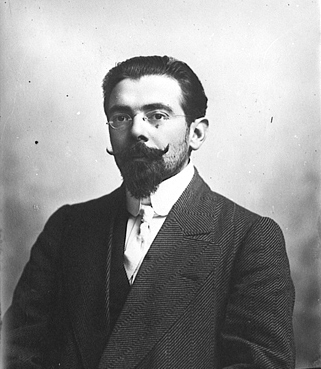

Prime Minister of Portugal
- In office 18 December 1925 – 29 May 1926
- President: Bernardino Machado
- Preceded by: Domingos Pereira
- Succeeded by: José Mendes Cabeçadas (as head of the National Salvation Junta)
- In office 2 July 1925 – 1 August 1925
- President: Manuel Teixeira Gomes
- Preceded by: Vitorino Guimarães
- Succeeded by: Domingos Pereira
- In office 6 February 1922 – 15 November 1923
- President: António José de Almeida; Manuel Teixeira Gomes
- Preceded by: Francisco da Cunha Leal
- Succeeded by: António Ginestal Machado
- In office 26 June 1920 – 19 July 1920
- President: José Ramos Preto
- Preceded by: António Maria Baptista
- Succeeded by: António Granjo

Personal details
- Born: 26 May 1872 Lisbon, Kingdom of Portugal
- Died: 14 October 1950 (aged 78) Lisbon, Portugal
- Party: Democratic Party
- Spouse: Adelina Antónia Marques de Lemos
- Children: Maria Manuela
- Education: University of Coimbra
- Occupation: Mining engineer

António Maria da Silva, GCTE (European Portuguese pronunciation: [ɐ̃ˈtɔni.u mɐˈɾi.ɐ ðɐ ˈsilvɐ, ɐ̃ˈtɔnju -]; 26 May 1872 in Lisbon – 14 October 1950 in Lisbon) was a Portuguese politician. An engineer, he was a prominent member of the Portuguese Republican Party. He was Prime Minister (President of the Council of Ministers) for four times, during the Portuguese First Republic. After his party's victory in the legislative elections of 8 November 1925, he was invited to form a government. He led a great campaign against President Manuel Teixeira Gomes, that forced him to resign. He was the last Prime Minister of the 1st Republic, resigning two days after the 28 May 1926 military movement.

For his services, he was awarded with the Grand Cross of the Military Order of the Tower and Sword.

== In popular culture ==
He was caricatured in the very first Portuguese animated film, O Pesadelo de António Maria (1923) by Joaquim Guerreiro.

Political offices
Preceded by António Maria Baptista	Prime Minister of Portugal (President of the Ministry); 1920	Succeeded by António Granjo
Preceded by Francisco da Cunha Leal	Prime Minister of Portugal (President of the Ministry); 1922–1923	Succeeded by António Ginestal Machado
Preceded by Vitorino Guimarães	Prime Minister of Portugal (President of the Ministry); 1925	Succeeded by Domingos Pereira
Preceded by Domingos Pereira	Prime Minister of Portugal (President of the Ministry); 1925–1926	Succeeded by José Mendes Cabeçadas
