= Lobo (surname) =

Origin
- Meaning: toponymic; literally "wolf"

Lobo is a surname found in the Galician, Spanish and Portuguese languages meaning "wolf", and in other languages with other meanings. Notable people with the surname include:

- Almiro Lobo (born 1982), known as Miro, Mozambican football player
- Alonso Lobo (1555–1617), Spanish composer
- Amberley Lobo (born 1990), Australian television presenter
- Anthony Theodore Lobo (1937–2013), Pakistani Catholic bishop
- António Lobo de Almada Negreiros (1868–1939), Portuguese journalist, colonialist writer, essayist and poet
- António Lobo Antunes (1942–2026), Portuguese writer and psychiatrist
- Baltasar Lobo (1910–1993), Spanish artist, anarchist and sculptor
- Bruno Lobo (born 1993), Brazilian kite surfer
- Cavin Lobo (born 1988), Indian footballer
- Claude Lobo (1943–2011), French car designer
- Cristiana Lôbo (1957–2021), Brazilian journalist
- Cristiana Lobo (swimmer) (born 1972), Brazilian swimmer
- Duarte Lobo (1565–1646), Portuguese composer
- Edu Lobo (born 1943), Brazilian singer, guitarist, and composer
- Emerico Lobo de Mesquita (1746–1805), Brazilian composer, music teacher, conductor and organist
- Emiro Lobo (1948–2007), Venezuelan painter, graphic artist and designer
- Erik Lobo (born 1970), American artist and comedic actor
- Eugenio Gerardo Lobo (1679–1750), Spanish soldier and poet
- Francisco Miranda da Costa Lobo (1864–1945), Portuguese astronomer, pioneer of spectrography
- Francisco Rodrigues Lobo (1580–1622), Portuguese poet and bucolic writer
- Ignatius P. Lobo (1919–2010), Indian Catholic prelate
- Ildo Lobo (1953–2004), Cape Verdean singer
- Jason Lobo (born 1969), British athlete
- Jerónimo Lobo (1593–1678), Portuguese Jesuit missionary
- João Lobo Antunes (1944–2016), Portuguese neurosurgeon
- Julio Lobo (1898–1983), Cuban sugar trader and financier
- Leonard D. Lobo, Indian headmaster
- Luis Lobo (born 1970), Argentine tennis player
- Manuel Lobo Antunes (born 1958), Portuguese lawyer and diplomat
- Mario Humberto Lobo (born 1964), Argentine footballer
- Mary Kay Lobo (born 1975), American psychiatric neuroscientist
- Mervyn Lobo, Pakistani health activist
- Michael Lobo (born 1953), Indian scientist and genealogist
- Michael Lobo (politician) (born 1976), Indian politician
- Miguel Lobo y Malagamba (1821–1876), Spanish admiral
- Nahuel Lobo (born 1991), Argentine rugby player
- Pedro Lobo (born 1954), Brazilian photographer
- Porfirio Lobo Sosa (born 1947), President of Honduras
- Rebecca Lobo (born 1973), American basketball player and television analyst
- Ricardo Lobo (born 1984), Brazilian football player
- Rogerio Hyndman Lobo (1923–2015), Macanese businessman
- Rogerio Lobo (boxer) (1971–2006), Brazilian boxer
- Sascha Lobo (born 1975), German blogger, writer, journalist and copywriter
- Stephen Lobo (born 1973), Canadian actor
- Tatiana Lobo (1939–2023), Chilean-born Costa Rican writer
