= Lobo Antunes =

Lobo Antunes is the name of:

- António Lobo Antunes (born 1942), Portuguese writer
- João Lobo Antunes (1944–2016), Portuguese neurosurgeon
- Paula Lobo Antunes (born 1976), Portuguese actor
