= List of ambassadors of Portugal to the United Kingdom =

Ambassador of Portugal to the United Kingdom
- Ambassador of the Portuguese State to the Court of St James's
- Incumbent; Nuno Brito since April 2022
- Style: His Excellency (formal); Mr. Ambassador (informal)
- Residence: 11 Belgrave Square, London
- Appointer: President of the Portuguese Republic with the advice and consent of the Government
- Inaugural holder: Antão de Almada as Ambassador
- Website: Embaixada de Portugal no Reino Unido

The Portuguese Ambassador to the United Kingdom (known formally in the United Kingdom as Ambassador of the Portuguese Republic to the Court of St James's) is the official representative of the Portuguese Republic to the King and Government of the United Kingdom of Great Britain and Northern Ireland.

The Portuguese Embassy is located at 11 Belgrave Square, London.

The current ambassador is Nuno Brito, who succeeded Manuel Lobo Antunes in 2022.

== List of highest-ranking Portuguese envoys to Britain ==
=== Legation (1641–1924) ===
The following list of heads of mission comes from the Diplomatic Institute of the Portuguese Ministry of Foreign Affairs.

| Name | Portrait | Title | Appointment | Presentation | Termination | Appointer | Notes |
|---|---|---|---|---|---|---|---|
| Antão de Almada | | Ambassador | 7 April 1641 | 7 April 1641 | 1642 | John IV of Portugal | Left post |
| Francisco de Andrade Leitão | | Ambassador | 7 April 1641 | 7 April 1641 | 1642 | John IV of Portugal | Left post |
| António de Sousa de Macedo | | Resident Minister | 1642 | | September 1650 | John IV of Portugal | Left post |
| Domingos do Rosário | | Special Minister | 1649 | | 1649 | John IV of Portugal | Left post |
| João de Guimarães | | Resident (?) Minister | 1649 | 1 October 1649 | 1652 | John IV of Portugal | Left post |
| Count of Penaguião | | Ambassador Extraordinary | August 1652 | August 1652 | 1655 | John IV of Portugal | Left post |
| Francisco Ferreira Rebelo | | Resident Minister | 1655 | ? | 1657 | John IV of Portugal | Left post |
| Francisco de Melo (e Torres ?) | | Ambassador | 1655? | ? | ? | John IV of Portugal | Left post |
| Francisco de Melo e Torres | | Ambassador | 10 September 1657 | 12 September 1657 | ? | Luisa, Queen Regent | Left post |
| Francisco de Melo e Torres | | Ambassador | 6 August 1659 | 6 August 1659 | 13 May 1660 | Luisa, Queen Regent | Left post |
| Francisco de Melo e Torres | | Ambassador | 2 August 1660 | ? | ? | Luisa, Queen Regent | Left post |
| Count of Ponte | | Ambassador | 1 February 1661 | ? | ? | Luisa, Queen Regent | Left post |
| Marquis of Sande | | Ambassador | 1662 | ? | ? | Luisa, Queen Regent | Left post |
| Francisco de Melo Manoel da Câmara | | Ambassador | 1663 | ? | 1667 | Afonso VI of Portugal | Left post |
| Francisco Ferreira Rebelo | | Envoy | 1664 | ? | March 1665 | Afonso VI of Portugal | Left post |
| Rui Teles de Meneses | | Resident Minister | 1667 | ? | ? | Afonso VI of Portugal | Left post |
| Cristóvão Soares de Abreu | | Minister | 1668 | ? | ? | Afonso VI of Portugal | Left post |
| Gaspar de Abreu de Freitas | | Envoy | 1668 | ? | July 1671 | Afonso VI of Portugal | Left post |
| Louis de Verjus | | Envoy Extraordinary | 4 February 1669 | ? | ? | Peter, Prince Regent | Left post |
| Francisco de Melo Manoel da Câmara | | Ambassador | 7 December 1671 | ? | 9 August 1678 | Peter, Prince Regent | Died |
| Gaspar de Abreu de Freitas | | Ambassador | 1679 | ? | March 1679 | Peter, Prince Regent | Left post |
| Marquis of Arronches | | Ambassador Extraordinary | 17 June 1679 | 16 June 1679 | 16 September 1681 | Peter, Prince Regent | Left post |
| José de Faria | | Envoy Extraordinary | July 1681 | ? | 24 September 1685 | Peter, Prince Regent | Left post |
| João de Sousa | | Envoy | 1684 | ? | ? | Peter II of Portugal | Left post |
| Simão de Sousa Magalhães | | Envoy | 1685 | 11 September 1685 | 26 March 1693 | Peter II of Portugal | Left post |
| Count of Pontével | | Ambassador Extraordinary | 1687 | ? | ? | Peter II of Portugal | Left post |
| Viscount of Fonte Arcada | | Envoy Extraordinary | 1692 | 23 November 1692 | 25 April 1697 | Peter II of Portugal | Left post |
| Luís da Cunha | | Envoy Extraordinary | 1696 | 1 May 1697 | April 1712 | Peter II of Portugal | Left post |
| Count of Tarouca | | Ambassador with no title | 1709 | ? | October 1710 | John V of Portugal | Left post |
| José da Cunha Brochado | | Envoy Extraordinary | 1710 | May 1710 | August 1715 | John V of Portugal | Left post |
| Count of Galveias | | Envoy Extraordinary | 1710? | ? | 1710 | John V of Portugal | Left post |
| Manuel de Sequeira | | Chargé d'affaires | 1713 | ? | 1715 | John V of Portugal | Left post |
| Luís da Cunha | | Ambassador Extraordinary | 1715 | 1715 | 1719? | John V of Portugal | Left post |
| Manuel de Sequeira da Cunha | | Chargé d'affaires | October 1718 | ? | 1719 | John V of Portugal | Left post |
| Jacinto Borges Pereira de Castro | | Envoy Extraordinary | 1719 | ? | 1720 | John V of Portugal | Died |
| António Galvão de Castelo Branco | | Envoy Extraordinary | 1721 | 27 February 1721 | July 1730 | John V of Portugal | Left post |
| António de Campos | | Resident Minister | 1730 | ? | 1734 | John V of Portugal | Left post |
| Marco António de Azevedo Coutinho | | Envoy Extraordinary | 1735 | 25 May 1735 | 20 June 1739 | John V of Portugal | Left post |
| Sebastião José de Carvalho e Melo | | Envoy Extraordinary | 1738 | 29 November 1738 | 25 September 1745 | John V of Portugal | Left post |
| Francisco Caetano de Castro | | Chargé d'affaires | 1745 | ? | 1748 | John V of Portugal | Left post |
| António Freire de Andrade Encerrabodes | | Envoy Extraordinary | March 1748 | 28 March 1748 | 1750 | John V of Portugal | Left post |
| Joaquim José Fidalgo da Silveira | | Envoy Extraordinary | 1750 | 26 November 1750 | December 1752 | Joseph I of Portugal | Left post |
| Luís da Cunha Manuel | | Envoy Extraordinary | 1752 | 23 November 1752 | 15 April 1756 | Joseph I of Portugal | Left post |
| Martinho de Melo e Castro | | Envoy Extraordinary | May 1756 | June 1759 | 1762? | Joseph I of Portugal | Left post |
| José de Melo | | Envoy Extraordinary | 1761? | ? | ? | Joseph I of Portugal | Left post |
| Count of Cunha | | Ambassador Extraordinary | June 1761 | ? | ? | Joseph I of Portugal | Left post |
| José de Sá Pereira | | Chargé d'affaires | 1763 | ? | January 1764 | Joseph I of Portugal | Left post |
| Martinho de Melo e Castro | | Plenipotentiary | 1764 | January 1764 | 19 December 1769 | Joseph I of Portugal | Left post |
| Amador José da Costa Asso | | Chargé d'affaires | 19 December 1769 | ? | 12 February 1770 | Joseph I of Portugal | Left post |
| Francisco de Melo e Carvalho | | Envoy Extraordinary | 12 February 1770 | 21 February 1770 | July 1774 | Joseph I of Portugal | Left post |
| Gaspar da Costa | | Chargé d'affaires | 1772 | ? | 1772? | Joseph I of Portugal | Left post |
| João Filipe da Fonseca | | Official | February 1773 | ? | July 1774 | Joseph I of Portugal | Left post |
| Luís Pinto de Sousa Coutinho | | Envoy Extraordinary and Plenipotentiary | 4 July 1774 | 8 July 1774 | 5 September 1788 | Joseph I of Portugal | Left post |
| Cipriano Ribeiro Pereira | | Interim chargé d'affaires | 4 September 1783 | ? | 3 September 1785 | Maria I of Portugal | Left post |
| Cipriano Ribeiro Freire | | Chargé d'affaires | 5 September 1788 | ? | July 1792 | Maria I of Portugal | Left post |
| Count of Galveias | | Envoy Extraordinary and Minister Plenipotentiary | July 1792 | ? | 3 February 1801 | John, Prince Regent | Left post |
| Marquis of Pombal | | Ambassador Extraordinary | 1796 | ? | 1796 | John, Prince Regent | Left post |
| Count of Pombeiro | | Emissary | 18 November 1797 | ? | 30 November 1797 | John, Prince Regent | Left post |
| José Rademaker | | Agent | 1801 | ? | ? | John, Prince Regent | Left post |
| Lourenço de Lima | | Envoy Extraordinary and Minister Plenipotentiary | 1801 | ? | 3 June 1802 | John, Prince Regent | Left post |
| Count of Pombeiro | | Special mission (?) | January 1801 | ? | April 1801 | John, Prince Regent | Left post |
| Count of Funchal | | Envoy Extraordinary and Minister Plenipotentiary | March 1803 | ? | 1810 | John, Prince Regent | Left post |
| Count of Funchal | | Envoy Extraordinary and Minister Plenipotentiary | 1810 | ? | 28 September 1815 | John, Prince Regent | Left post |
| Cipriano Ribeiro Freire | | Minister Plenipotentiary | 1814 | 12 April 1815 | February 1816 | John, Prince Regent | Left post |
| Count of Palmela | | Envoy Extraordinary and Minister Plenipotentiary | February 1816 | ? | November 1817 | John, Prince Regent | Left post |
| José Luís de Sousa | | Ambassador in special mission (?) | 1820 | ? | November 1821 | John VI of Portugal | Left post |
| João Francisco de Oliveira | | Chargé d'affaires | 1821 | ? | May 1822 | John VI of Portugal | Left post |
| Rafael da Cruz Guerreiro | | Chargé d'affaires | May 1822 | ? | June 1823 | John VI of Portugal | Left post |
| José Luís de Sousa | | Envoy Extraordinary and Minister Plenipotentiary | September 1823 | ? | February 1825 | John VI of Portugal | Left post |
| Marquis of Palmela | | Ambassador Extraordinary | 1825 | ? | May 1827 | John VI of Portugal | Left post |
| José Luís de Sousa | | Ambassador Extraordinary and Minister Plenipotentiary | May 1827 | ? | ? | Maria II of Portugal | Left post |
| Viscount of Asseca | | Minister Plenipotentiary | 1829? | ? | 1831? | Michael I of Portugal | Left post |
| Tomás de Mascarenhas | | Agent | 1830? | ? | ? | Michael I of Portugal | Left post |
| Viscount of Telheiras | | Interim chargé d'affaires | 1 April 1830 | ? | 5 October 1830 | Michael I of Portugal | Left post |
| Viscount of Carreira | | Minister Plenipotentiary | 6 October 1830 | ? | 6 September 1833 | Michael I of Portugal | Left post |
| Count of Funchal | | ? | 1832? | - | ? | Michael I of Portugal | Left post |
| Viscount of Carreira | | Minister Plenipotentiary | 6 September 1833 | 23 October 1833 | 1 January 1834 | Michael I of Portugal | Left post |
| Cristóvão Pedro de Morais Sarmento | | Envoy Extraordinary and Minister Plenipotentiary | 2 January 1834 | 2 May 1834 | 13 December 1836 | Michael I of Portugal | Left post |
| Marçal José Ribeiro | | Interim chargé d'affaires | 14 December 1836 | ? | 4 October 1837 | Maria II of Portugal | Left post |
| Francisco Rebello de Carvalho | | Interim chargé d'affaires | 5 October 1837 | ? | 6 May 1839 | Maria II of Portugal | Left post |
| Cristóvão Pedro de Morais Sarmento | | Minister Plenipotentiary | 7 May 1839 | 18 May 1839 | 13 September 1850 | Maria II of Portugal | Left post |
| Marçal José Ribeiro | | Interim chargé d'affaires | 13 September 1850 | ? | 6 September 1851 | Maria II of Portugal | Left post |
| Count of Lavradio | | Minister Plenipotentiary | 7 September 1851 | 23 October 1851 | 26 November 1869 | Maria II of Portugal | Left post |
| Frederico Francisco de la Figaniére | | Interim chargé d'affaires | 27 November 1869 | ? | 12 February 1870 | Luís I of Portugal | Left post |
| Viscount of Seisal | | Minister Plenipotentiary | 12 February 1870 | 22 February 1870 | 4 October 1870 | Luís I of Portugal | Left post |
| Duke of Saldanha | | Minister Plenipotentiary | 4 October 1870 | 28 November 1870 | 21 November 1876 | Luís I of Portugal | Died |
| Henrique Teixeira de Sampaio | | Interim chargé d'affaires | 22 November 1876 | ? | 7 December 1876 | Luís I of Portugal | Left post |
| Eduardo Teixeira de Sampaio | | Interim chargé d'affaires | 8 December 1876 | ? | 7 April 1877 | Luís I of Portugal | Left post |
| Miguel Dantas | | Minister Plenipotentiary | 8 April 1877 | 30 April 1877 | 31 January 1890 | Luís I of Portugal | Left post |
| Luís Pinto de Soveral | | Interim chargé d'affaires | 31 January 1890 | ? | 10 February 1890 | Carlos I of Portugal | Left post |
| Augusto César Barjona de Freitas | | Minister Plenipotentiary | 10 February 1890? | ? | 27 August 1890 | Carlos I of Portugal | Left post |
| Luís Pinto de Soveral | | Interim chargé d'affaires | 27 August 1890 | ? | 3 January 1891 | Carlos I of Portugal | Left post |
| Luís Pinto de Soveral | | Minister Plenipotentiary | 23 January 1891 | ? | 17 September 1895 | Carlos I of Portugal | Left post |
| Carlos Cirilo Machado | | Interim chargé d'affaires | 17 September 1895 | ? | 22 October 1895 | Carlos I of Portugal | Left post |
| Miguel Dantas | | Minister Plenipotentiary | 22 October 1895 | 9 November 1895 | 18 February 1896 | Carlos I of Portugal | Left post |
| Frederico Arouca | | Minister Plenipotentiary | 18 February 1896 | ? | 21 July 1896 | Carlos I of Portugal | Left post |
| Alfredo Alcino de Castro | | Interim chargé d'affaires | 21 July 1896 | ? | 28 April 1897 | Carlos I of Portugal | Left post |
| Marquis of Soveral | | Minister Plenipotentiary | 28 April 1897 | ? | 13 October 1910 | Carlos I of Portugal | Left post |
| Jerónimo Pinheiro de Almeida da Câmara Manuel | | Interim chargé d'affaires | 13 October 1910 | ? | 8 April 1911 | Teófilo Braga, President of the Provisional Government of the Portuguese Republic | Left post |
| Manuel Teixeira Gomes | | Minister Plenipotentiary | 8 April 1911 | 11 October 1911 | 7 January 1918 | Teófilo Braga, President of the Provisional Government of the Portuguese Republic | Left post |
| Pedro de Tovar | | Interim chargé d'affaires | 7 January 1918 | ? | 11 March 1918 | Bernardino Machado | Left post |
| Augusto de Vasconcelos | | Minister Plenipotentiary | 11 March 1918 | 19 July 1918 | 17 May 1919 | Bernardino Machado | Left post |
| Manuel Teixeira Gomes | | Minister Plenipotentiary | 19 May 1919 | 24 May 1919 | 26 September 1923 | João do Canto e Castro | Left post |
| João António de Bianchi | | Interim chargé d'affaires | 26 September 1923 | ? | 24 April 1924 | António José de Almeida | Left post |
| Augusto de Castro Corte-Real | | Minister Plenipotentiary | 24 April 1924 | 5 May 1924 | 10 June 1924 | Manuel Teixeira Gomes | Left post |

=== Embassy (1924–present) ===
The following list of heads of mission comes from the Diplomatic Institute of the Portuguese Ministry of Foreign Affairs.

| Name | Portrait | Title | Appointment | Presentation | Termination | Appointer | Notes |
|---|---|---|---|---|---|---|---|
| José Mendes Ribeiro Norton de Matos | | Ambassador | 1 July 1924 | 11 July 1924 | 9 July 1926 | Manuel Gomes da Costa | Left post |
| Tomás António Garcia Rosado | | Ambassador | 16 July 1926 | 10 August 1926 | 28 May 1933 | Óscar Carmona | Left post |
| Rui Ennes Ulrich | | Ambassador | 12 June 1933 | 17 June 1933 | 20 January 1936 | Óscar Carmona | Left post |
| Alberto de Oliveira | | Ambassador | 26 January 1936 | 18 February 1936 | 1 July 1936 | Óscar Carmona | Left post |
| Francisco de Assis Maria de Oliveira de Almeida Calheiros e Meneses | | Interim chargé d'affaires | 1 July 1936 | ? | 31 December 1936 | Óscar Carmona | Left post |
| Armindo Rodrigues de Stau Monteiro | | Ambassador | 31 December 1936 | 3 February 1937 | 22 September 1943 | Óscar Carmona | Left post |
| Domingos de Sousa Holstein Beck | | Ambassador | 30 September 1943 | 13 October 1943 | 17 December 1949 | Óscar Carmona | Left post |
| Henrique Bacelar Caldeira Queiróz | | Interim chargé d'affaires | 17 December 1949 | — | 17 April 1950 | Óscar Carmona | Left post |
| Rui Ennes Ulrich | | Ambassador | 17 April 1950 | 5 May 1950 | 7 August 1953 | Óscar Carmona | Left post |
| Albano Pires Fernandes Nogueira | | Interim chargé d'affaires | 7 August 1953 | — | 22 October 1953 | Francisco Craveiro Lopes | Left post |
| Pedro Teotónio Pereira | | Ambassador | 22 October 1953 | 29 October 1953 | 1 September 1958 | Francisco Craveiro Lopes | Left post |
| João Manuel Hall Themido | | Interim chargé d'affaires | 1 September 1958 | — | 1 October 1958 | Américo Tomás | Left post |
| João de Lucena | | Interim chargé d'affaires | 1 October 1958 | — | 3 November 1958 | Américo Tomás | Left post |
| Augusto Rato Potier | | Interim chargé d'affaires | 4 November 1958 | — | 15 January 1959 | Américo Tomás | Left post |
| Adolfo do Amaral Abranches Pinto | | Ambassador | 15 January 1959 | 4 February 1959 | 31 March 1961 | Américo Tomás | Left post |
| Salvador Augusto de Sousa Sampayo Garrido | | Interim chargé d'affaires | 31 March 1961 | — | 26 August 1961 | Américo Tomás | Left post |
| Manuel Farrajota Rocheta | | Ambassador | 26 August 1961 | 19 October 1961 | 30 October 1968 | Américo Tomás | Left post |
| José Manuel de Villas-Boas de Vasconcelos Faria | | Interim chargé d'affaires | 30 October 1968 | — | 28 November 1968 | Américo Tomás | Left post |
| António Auusto Braga Leite Faria | | Ambassador | 28 November 1968 | 1969? | 31 October 1973 | Américo Tomás | Left post |
| João de Sá Coutinho Rebelo Sotto Maior | | Interim chargé d'affaires | 31 October 1973 | — | 12 November 1973 | Américo Tomás | Left post |
| Gonçalo Luís Maravilhas Correia Caldeira Coelho | | Ambassador | 12 November 1973 | 30 November 1973 | 29 June 1974 | Américo Tomás | Left post |
| João de Sá Coutinho Rebelo Sotto Maior | | Interim chargé d'affaires | 29 June 1974 | — | 25 July 1974 | António de Spínola | Left post |
| Albano Pires Fernandes Nogueira | | Ambassador | 25 July 1974 | 2 August 1974 | 6 November 1976 | António de Spínola | Left post |
| João Diogo Correia Saraiva Nunes Barata | | Interim chargé d'affaires | 6 November 1976 | — | 7 February 1977 | António Ramalho Eanes | Left post |
| Virgílio Armando Martins | | Ambassador | 7 February 1977 | 17 March 1977 | 19 September 1979 | António Ramalho Eanes | Left post |
| Pedro Paulo de Moraes Alves Machado | | Interim chargé d'affaires | 19 September 1979 | — | 19 February 1980 | António Ramalho Eanes | Left post |
| João Carlos Lopes Cardoso de Freitas Cruz | | Ambassador | 19 February 1980 | 6 March 1980 | 14 March 1984 | António Ramalho Eanes | Left post |
| José Maria de Almeida Sherman de Lemos Macedo | | Interim chargé d'affaires | 14 March 1984 | — | 19 March 1984 | Mário Soares | Left post |
| João Manuel Hall Themido | | Ambassador | 19 March 1984 | 29 March 1984 | 5 January 1989 | Mário Soares | Left post |
| Manuel Henrique de Mello e Castro de Mendonça Côrte-Real | | Interim chargé d'affaires | 5 January 1989 | — | 5 June 1989 | Mário Soares | Left post |
| António Augusto Marques da Costa Vaz Pereira | | Ambassador | 5 June 1989 | 12 July 1989 | 10 December 1994 | Mário Soares | Left post |
| António Leal da Costa Lobo | | Ambassador | 23 February 1995 | 18 May 1995 | 18 August 1997 | Mário Soares | Left post |
| José Gregório Faria Quiterres | | Ambassador | 12 September 1997 | 5 November 1997 | 2 September 2003 | Jorge Sampaio | Left post |
| Fernando António de Lacerda Andersen Guimarães | | Ambassador | 14 November 2003 | — | 13 November 2006 | Jorge Sampaio | Left post |
| António Nunes de Carvalho Santana Carlos | | Ambassador | 17 November 2006 | — | 19 March 2010 | Aníbal Cavaco Silva | Left post |
| António Nunes de Carvalho Santana Carlos | | Ambassador Extraordinary | 20 March 2010 | — | 31 October 2010 | Aníbal Cavaco Silva | Left post |
| Cristina Castanheta | | Interim chargé d'affaires | 1 November 2010 | — | 17 January 2011 | Aníbal Cavaco Silva | Left post |
| João de Vallera | | Ambassador | 17 January 2011 | — | 30 July 2016 | Aníbal Cavaco Silva | Left post |
| Manuel Lobo Antunes | | Ambassador | 1 August 2016 | 31 August 2016 | 25 March 2022 | Marcelo Rebelo de Sousa | Left post |
| Nuno Filipe Alves Salvador e Brito | | Ambassador | 26 January 2022 | 7 April 2022 | — | Marcelo Rebelo de Sousa | Currently in post |
