= João Hall Themido =

Portuguese diplomat

João Manuel Hall Themido (6 January 1924 – 7 November 2017) was a Portuguese diplomat who was Portugal's Ambassador to the United States from 1971 to 1981, as well as Portugal's Ambassador to the United Kingdom (from 19 March 1984 to 1989) and to Italy (from April 1968). He retired in 1989, having begun his career with the Portuguese Foreign Ministry in 1947, and been one of only a few Portuguese Ambassadors to stay in post following the Coup of 25 November 1975.

Hall Themido was awarded Portugal's Ordem Militar da Torre e Espada, Valor, Lealdade e Mérito (Grã-Cruz) in 1984.

== Books ==
- Hall Themido, João (1995), Dez anos em Washington, 1971-1981: As verdades e os mitos nas relacoes luso-americanas (Caminhos da memoria), Publicacoes Dom Quixote, ISBN 978-9722012621
- Hall Themido, João (2008), Uma autobiografia disfarçada, [Lisboa]: Inst. Diplomático - Min. dos Negócios Estrangeiros.
