= List of ambassadors of Portugal to the United States =

Ambassador of Portugal to the United States

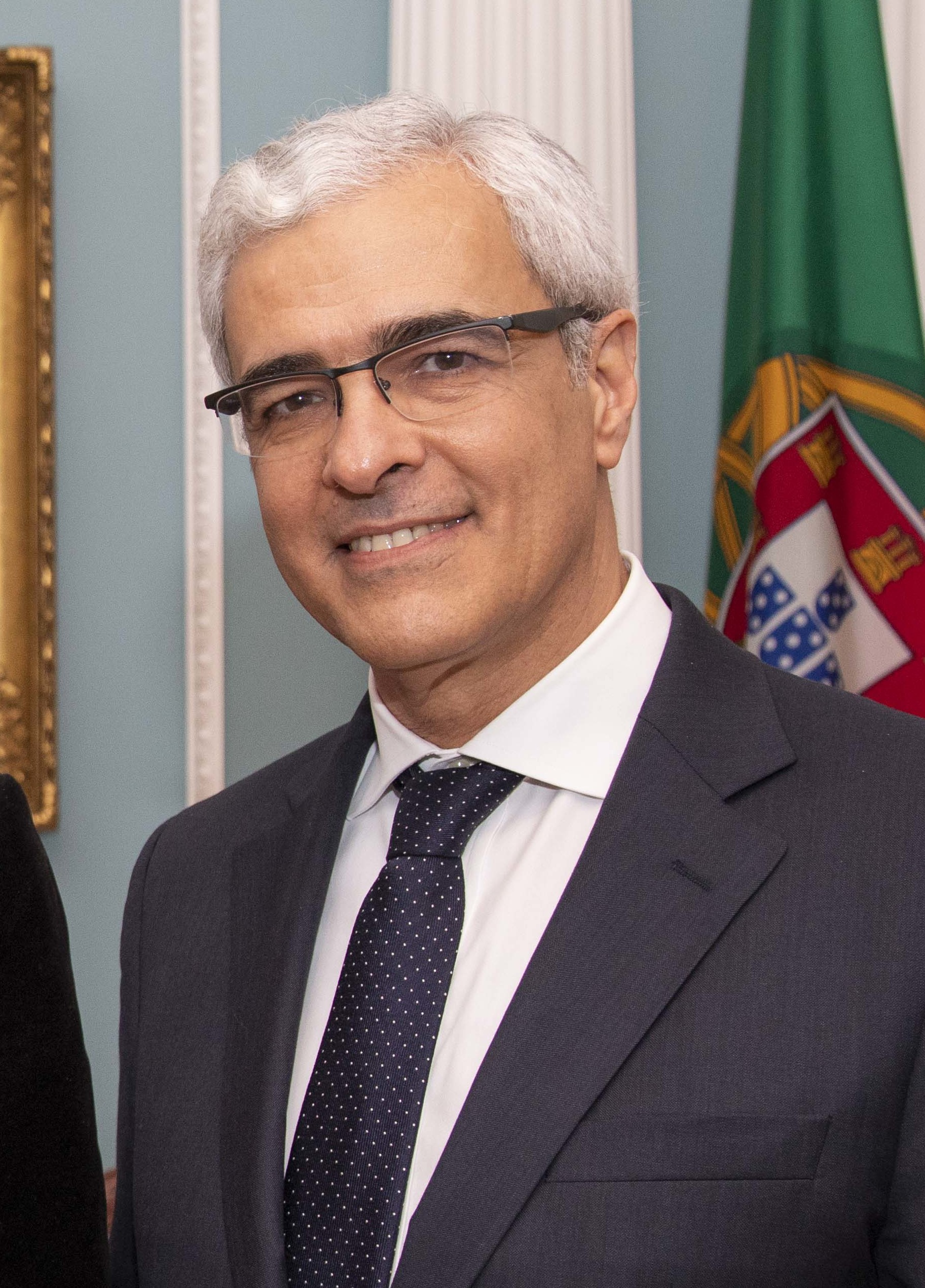
- Incumbent; Domingos Teixeira de Abreu Fezas Vital since January 28, 2016
- Seat: Embassy of Portugal, 2012 Massachusetts Ave NW, Washington, DC 20036
- Inaugural holder: Cipriano Ribeiro Freire
- Formation: October 30, 1794

The Portuguese ambassador in Washington, D.C. is the official representative of the Government in Lisbon to the Government of the United States.

== List of representatives ==
The representatives have been:

| Diplomatic agrément | Diplomatic accreditation | Ambassador | Observations | List of prime ministers of Portugal | List of presidents of the United States | Term end |
|---|---|---|---|---|---|---|
| October 30, 1794 | October 30, 1794 | Cipriano Ribeiro Freire | | Maria I of Portugal | George Washington | June 1799 |
| 1801 | | João Paulo Bezerra | | Maria I of Portugal | Thomas Jefferson | January 30, 1801 |
| April 24, 1805 | | José Rademaker | Chargé d'affaires | Maria I of Portugal | Thomas Jefferson | 1801 |
| July 22, 1816 | | José Correia da Serra | | John VI of Portugal | James Madison | July 10, 1816 |
| December 4, 1820 | | José Amado Greon | Chargé d'affaires | John VI of Portugal | James Monroe | August 31, 1820 |
| June 27, 1822 | | Joaquim Barroso Pereira | Chargé d'affaires | John VI of Portugal | James Monroe | June 25, 1822 |
| September 30, 1822 | | Francisco Solano Constâncio | Chargé d'affaires | John VI of Portugal | James Monroe | August 17, 1822 |
| 1824 | | Joaquim Barroso Pereira (enviado por D.Pedro IV) | Chargé d'affaires | Pedro I of Brazil | James Monroe | 1823 |
| August 26, 1828 | January 29, 1830 | Jacobo Torlade Pereira de Azambuja (enviado por D.Miguel I) | Chargé d'affaires | Miguel I of Portugal | John Quincy Adams | January 29, 1829 |
| January 14, 1832 | December 5, 1834 | Joaquim César de la Figaniére e Morão (enviado por D.Pedro IV) | Chargé d'affaires | Pedro IV of Portugal | Andrew Jackson | 1834 |
| June 1, 1838 | | João de Almeida de la Figaniére | Chargé d'affaires | Ferdinand II of Portugal | Martin Van Buren | May 31, 1838 |
| October 2, 1839 | October 2, 1839 | António Cândido de Faria | Chargé d'affaires | Ferdinand II of Portugal | Martin Van Buren | October 1, 1839 |
| November 21, 1839 | | Barão de Wiederhold | Chargé d'affaires | Ferdinand II of Portugal | Martin Van Buren | November 20, 1839 |
| December 27, 1840 | December 30, 1840 | Joaquim César de la Figaniére e Morão | | Ferdinand II of Portugal | Martin Van Buren | December 26, 1840 |
| August 23, 1854 | October 26, 1854 | Joaquim César de la Figaniére e Morão | Ministro Residente | Pedro V of Portugal | Franklin Pierce | August 23, 1854 |
| December 24, 1866 | | Manuel Garcia da Rosa | Chargé d'affaires | Luís I of Portugal | Andrew Johnson | May 30, 1867 |
| May 30, 1867 | May 31, 1867 | Miguel Martins D'Antas | | Luís I of Portugal | Andrew Johnson | October 26, 1869 |
| October 26, 1869 | | António Maria da Cunha Pereira Sotto Maior | | Luís I of Portugal | Ulysses S. Grant | January 11, 1872 |
| January 11, 1872 | January 12, 1872 | João de Sousa Lobo | | Luís I of Portugal | Ulysses S. Grant | August 20, 1874 |
| November 11, 1874 | November 11, 1874 | Barão de Sant'Anna | | Luís I of Portugal | Ulysses S. Grant | September 27, 1876 |
| November 25, 1876 | | Gustavo Amsink | | Luís I of Portugal | Ulysses S. Grant | October 8, 1878 |
| October 8, 1878 | October 8, 1878 | Visconde das Nogueiras | | Luís I of Portugal | Rutherford B. Hayes | January 24, 1888 |
| January 24, 1888 | | Barão de Almeirim | Chargé d'affaires | Luís I of Portugal | Grover Cleveland | October 27, 1889 |
| October 27, 1889 | December 23, 1889 | Tomás de Sousa Rosa | | Carlos I of Portugal | Benjamin Harrison | May 24, 1894 |
| June 20, 1894 | | Ignácio Rodrigues da Costa Duarte | Chargé d'affaires | Carlos I of Portugal | Grover Cleveland | July 3, 1895 |
| July 3, 1895 | | Augusto de Sequeira Thedim | | Carlos I of Portugal | Grover Cleveland | November 21, 1895 |
| November 21, 1895 | | Luiz Augusto de Moura Pinto d'Azevedo Taviera | Chargé d'affaires | Carlos I of Portugal | Grover Cleveland | April 28, 1896 |
| April 28, 1896 | May 6, 1896 | Visconde de Santo Thyrso | | Carlos I of Portugal | Grover Cleveland | September 30, 1901 |
| October 7, 1901 | | Luiz Augusto de Moura P. de Azevedo Taveira | Chargé d'affaires | Carlos I of Portugal | Theodore Roosevelt | April 24, 1902 |
| April 24, 1902 | May 12, 1902 | José Francisco de Horta Machado da Franca (Visconde D'Alte) | | Carlos I of Portugal | Theodore Roosevelt | May 12, 1933 |
| May 12, 1933 | | Gabriel da Silva | Chargé d'affaires | António de Oliveira Salazar | Franklin D. Roosevelt | September 15, 1933 |
| September 15, 1933 | September 17, 1933 | João António de Bianchi | | António de Oliveira Salazar | Franklin D. Roosevelt | June 30, 1944 |
| June 30, 1944 | July 12, 1944 | João António de Bianchi | | António de Oliveira Salazar | Franklin D. Roosevelt | July 23, 1947 |
| August 1, 1947 | August 12, 1947 | Pedro Teotónio Pereira | | António de Oliveira Salazar | Harry S. Truman | February 11, 1950 |
| February 11, 1950 | | Manuel Farrajota Rocheta | | António de Oliveira Salazar | Harry S. Truman | June 6, 1950 |
| June 6, 1950 | June 23, 1950 | Luis Esteves Fernandes | | António de Oliveira Salazar | Harry S. Truman | July 8, 1961 |
| August 14, 1961 | September 15, 1961 | Pedro Teotónio Pereira | | Américo Tomás | John F. Kennedy | November 13, 1963 |
| November 13, 1963 | | José Eduardo de Menezes Rosa | Chargé d'affaires | Américo Tomás | Lyndon B. Johnson | March 2, 1964 |
| March 2, 1964 | April 8, 1964 | Vasco Vieira Garin | | Américo Tomás | Lyndon B. Johnson | June 30, 1971 |
| June 30, 1971 | | António Cabrita Matias | Chargé d'affaires | Américo Tomás | Richard Nixon | November 23, 1971 |
| November 23, 1971 | December 6, 1971 | João Hall Themido | | Américo Tomás | Richard Nixon | February 13, 1981 |
| February 12, 1981 | | Pedro Ribeiro de Menezes | Chargé d'affaires | Américo Tomás | Richard Nixon | |
| May 4, 1981 | June 13, 1981 | Vasco Luís Caldeira Coelho Futcher Pereira | | António Ramalho Eanes | Ronald Reagan | May 17, 1982 |
| July 9, 1982 | | Pedro Ribeiro de Menezes | Chargé d'affaires | António Ramalho Eanes | Ronald Reagan | July 9, 1982 |
| August 30, 1982 | September 8, 1982 | Leonardo Charles de Zaffiri Duarte Mathias | | António Ramalho Eanes | Ronald Reagan | June 2, 1986 |
| July 28, 1986 | August 29, 1986 | João Eduardo Monteverde Pereira Bastos | | Mário Soares | Ronald Reagan | August 5, 1991 |
| August 15, 1991 | September 6, 1991 | Francisco José Laço Treichler Knopfli | | Mário Soares | George H. W. Bush | March 6, 1995 |
| March 26, 1995 | May 5, 1995 | Fernando António de Lacerda Andresen Guimarães | | Mário Soares | Bill Clinton | May 13, 1999 |
| May 18, 1999 | August 10, 1999 | João Alberto Bacelar da Rocha Páris | | Jorge Sampaio | Bill Clinton | January 9, 2002 |
| October 9, 2002 | | Pedro Manuel dos Reis Alves Catarino | | Jorge Sampaio | George W. Bush | December 5, 2006 |
| June 1, 2007 | | João de Vallera | | Aníbal Cavaco Silva | George W. Bush | January 16, 2011 |
| February 7, 2011 | February 23, 2011 | Nuno Brito | | Pedro Passos Coelho | Barack Obama | October 4, 2015 |
| September 11, 2015 | January 28, 2016 | Domingos Teixeira de Abreu Fezas Vital | (* 1959 in Luanda) 2004: he was secretary of the mission next Representação Permanente de Portugal junto da União Europeia | António Costa | Barack Obama | December 16, 2021 |
| March, 15, 2022 | June 7, 2022 | Francisco Duarte Lopes | | António Costa | Joe Biden | |
