= List of ambassadors of Portugal to the Holy See =

Wikimedia list article

The List of Portuguese ambassadors to the Holy See enumerates the ambassadors of the Portugal to the Holy See (the Vatican).

== History ==
Relations between the Vatican State and Portugal date back to the founding of the independent Kingdom of Portugal in 1139, which the Holy See recognized in the papal bull Manifestis probatum, issued on 23 May 1179.

The Diplomatic Institute of the Portuguese Ministry of Foreign Affairs provides a list of Portuguese ambassadors to the Holy See starting from the restoration of Portuguese independence in 1640, an event recognized by Pope Clement X in the 1670 bull Ex Literis.

Diplomatic relations were interrupted on several occasions:

- from 1728 to 1732, due to a dispute between the absolutist King John V and Pope Benedict XIII,
- from 1760 to 1770, following Enlightenment-inspired measures taken by Prime Minister the Marquis of Pombal,
- from 1834 to 1841, as a result of anti-clerical policies during the Liberal Revolution in Portugal and the subsequent Liberal Wars,
- from 1911 to 1918, due to anti-clerical measures following the proclamation of the First Portuguese Republic.

== List of representatives ==
Portuguese Ambassadors to the Holy See
Name	Portrait	Period	Remarks
Vatican City
Flag of the Kingdom of Portugal (1667–1706)
Fernando Brandão		from 1641	Chargé d’affaires, headed the mission repeatedly as needed until 1643
Miguel de Portugal (Bishop of Lamego) (pt)		20 November 1641 –17 December 1642	Ambassador
Vicente Nogueira (pt)		1643–1654	Chargé d’affaires, absent on several occasions
Pedro Valadares		1643	Chargé d’affaires
Nicolau Monteiro		1644–1646	Diplomatic agent of the Papal States and minister without portfolio
Nuno da Cunha		1645	Interim agent
Agostinho Castelete		1646–1652	Status not mentioned
Manuel Pacheco		1646	Interim agent
António Vieira		1647–1650	Secret mission
Abbot of Intin		1648–1655	Status not mentioned
Manuel Álvares Carrilho		1648–1650	Church agent
Cardinal Orsini		1651–1663	Status not mentioned
Francisco de Sousa Coutinho		20 November 1655 –1658	Ambassador, accredited on 14 December 1655
Gaspar de Gouveia		1663 –1665	diplomatic Agent
Francisco Manuel de Melo		December 1663 –October 1664	without an official title
Francisco de Villes		1668	diplomatic Agent
João de Roxas de Azevedo		April 1669 –1670	Envoy
Francisco de Sousa (Conde de Prado, later Marquês de Minas) (pt)		after 19 October 1669 –1671	Special-Ambassador, accredited on 13 December 1669
Gaspar de Abreu de Freitas		1671	Resident
Luís de Sousa (Archbishop of Braga) (pt)		1676– 21 June 1682	Special-Ambassador, accredited on 16 February 1676
Domingos Barreiros Leitão		1683–1691	Resident
António do Rego		1688–1692	probably Resident
Bento da Fonseca		1692; 4 July 1698	Resident
António do Rego		4 July 1698 –1705	probably Resident
André de Melo e Castro (from 1718 also Conde de Galveias) (pt)		10 December 1707 –1718	Special Envoy
Rodrigo de Sá Almeida e Meneses (Marquês de Fontes)		21 May 1712 –17 January 1718	Special Envoy, accredited on 8 July 1716
André de Melo e Castro (from 1718 also Conde de Galveias)		1718 –17 March 1728	Ambassador, accredited on 19 June 1718
Pedro da Mota e Silva (pt)		1721 –20 March 1728	Envoy
José Maria da Fonseca e Évora		1730 –1 October 1741	Minister Plenipotentiary
Manuel Pereira de Sampaio		1740–1742	Chargé d’affaires
Manuel Pereira de Sampaio		1742–1749	Minister
Manuel Pereira de Sampaio		1749 –February 1750	Minister Plenipotentiary
António Cabral		February 1750 –8 October 1750	diplomatic Agent
António Freire de Andrade Encerrabodes		8 October 1750 –30 May 1756	Minister, accredited on 24 October 1750
Francisco de Almada e Mendonça		30 May 1756 –March 1757	without an official title
Francisco de Almada e Mendonça		1757 –27 July 1758	Minister
Francisco de Almada e Mendonça		1758 –7 July 1760	Minister Plenipotentiary
Francisco de Almada e Mendonça		1770 –August 1774	Minister Plenipotentiary
Visconde de Vila Nova do Souto D'El Rei		Around August 1774 –9 February 1779	Minister Plenipotentiary
Henriques de Meneses (from 1781 also Marquês do Louriçal)		February 1779 –2 July 1782	Minister Plenipotentiary, accredited on 9 February 1779, left on 10 January 1782
José Pereira de Santiago		1782–1783	Chargé d’affaires
Diogo José de Noronha		11 June 1782 –30 September 1787	Minister Plenipotentiary
José Pereira de Santiago		1786 –December 1788	Chargé d’affaires
João Teotónio de Almeida Beja e Noronha de Melo e Castro		1788 –3 August 1790	Minister Plenipotentiary, accredited on 9 December 1788
Alexandre de Sousa e Holstein		1790 –16 October 1796	Special Envoy and Minister Plenipotentiary, accredited on 6 December 1790
Luís Álvares da Cunha e Figueiredo		26 June 1792 –1802	Chargé d’affaires
Alexandre de Sousa e Holstein		1796 –22 July 1800	Ambassador
Alexandre de Sousa e Holstein		19 September 1802 –12 December 1803	Special-Ambassador, received on 22 September 1802 in Private audience and on 21 October 1802 accredited in an official audience
Pedro de Sousa Holstein		13 December 1803 –2 June 1805	Chargé d’affaires
José Manuel Pinto de Sousa		2 June 1805 –26 March 1818	Special Envoy and Minister Plenipotentiary, accredited on 3 June 1805
Luís Álvares da Cunha		1814–1818	Chargé d’affaires
Domingos António de Sousa Coutinho, Conde de Funchal		5 April 1816 –1817	Special-Ambassador, accredited on 30 April 1816
Luís Álvares da Cunha		1818	Chargé d’affaires
Pedro de Melo Breyner (pt)		24 July 1819 –8 July 1821	Special Envoy and Minister Plenipotentiary
José Severino Maciel da Costa		1821–1822	Chargé d’affaires
João Pedro Miguéis de Carvalho		1822–1824	Chargé d’affaires
Carlos Matias Pereira		15 May 1822 –August 1823	Chargé d’affaires, accredited on 22 August 1822
José Amado Grehon		August 1823 –25 June 1824	Chargé d’affaires
João Pedro Miguéis de Carvalho e Brito (später Barão de Venda da Cruz)		June 1824 –1824	Chargé d’affaires, accredited on 25 June 1824
Conde de Funchal		30 November 1824 –1828	Ambassador, accredited on 6 December 1824, 1828 dismissed from the civil service
João Miguéis de Carvalho e Brito		August 1828 –20 June 1840	Chargé d’affaires
António de Almeida Portugal (Marquês de Lavradio) (pt)		1829–1834	Special-Ambassador, accredited on 21 September 1831
Luís António de Abreu e Lima, Visconde da Carreira (pt)		1835	Minister Plenipotentiary. Before accreditation could take place, his appointment was revoked on 4 June 1835
Jorge Hussom da Câmara		26 March 1838 –31 August 1838	Chargé d’affaires
João Pedro Migueis de Carvalho (Barão da Venda da Cruz)		1 September 1838 –5 August 1841	Chargé d’affaires
Visconde da Carreira		20 June 1840 –16 November 1841	Minister Plenipotentiary
João Pedro Migueis de Carvalho (Barão da Venda da Cruz)		5 August 1841 –11 November 1853	Minister Plenipotentiary
Jorge Husson da Câmara		12 November 1853 –24 May 1856	Chargé d’affaires
Conde da Ponte		1854 –24 November 1855	Minister Plenipotentiary
José de Vasconcelos e Sousa		24 May 1856 –2 March 1857	Minister Plenipotentiary
João Husson da Câmara		2 March 1857 –20 May 1858	Chargé d’affaires
Visconde de Alte		7 August 1857 –29 June 1858	Special Envoy and Minister Plenipotentiary on a special mission, accredited on 8 August 1857
Visconde de Alte		29 June 1858 –5 November 1862	Minister Plenipotentiary, accredited on 5 July 1858
Duke of Saldanha		20 November 1862 –10 January 1869	Ambassador
Luis de Quillinan		11 January 1869 –18 November 1869	Chargé d’affaires
Barão Ferreira dos Santos		19 November 1869 –6 December 1869	Chargé d’affaires
Francisco de Almeida Portugal, Conde de Lavradio (pt)		7 December 1869 –1 February 1870	Minister Plenipotentiary
Barão Ferreira dos Santos		2 February 1870 –20 July 1870	Chargé d’affaires
António Bernardo da Costa Cabral, Conde de Tomar		21 July 1870 –1 December 1877	Minister Plenipotentiary, left on 10 July 1877
António Bernardo da Costa Cabral, Conde de Tomar		31 December 1877 –30 September 1885	Ambassador, left on 1 September 1885
Augusto de Andrade		1 September 1885 –7 November 1885	Chargé d’affaires
João da Silva Ferrão de Carvalho Martens (pt)		7 November 1885 –15 November 1895	Ambassador, accredited on 14 November 1885
Francisco Roberto da Silva Ferrão de Carvalho Martens, 2nd Duke of Martens Ferrão (pt)		15 November 1895 –14 March 1896	Interim Chargé d’affaires
Miguel Martins Dantas (pt)		14 March 1896 –2 February 1910	Ambassador, accredited on 21 March 1896
Francisco Quintela de Sampaio		29 January 1910 –31 July 1910	Interim Chargé d’affaires
Republic of Portugal
Joaquim Pedro Martins (pt)		8 September 1919 –1 April 1924	Minister Plenipotentiary, accredited on 20 September 1919
Augusto de Castro Sampaio Côrte Real (pt)		18 July 1924 –2 August 1929	Minister Plenipotentiary, accredited on 22 July 1924
Henrique Trindade Coelho (pt)		7 October 1929 –8 October 1934	Minister Plenipotentiary, accredited on 12 October 1929
José Weinholtz de Bivar Brandeiro		8 October 1934 –14 January 1935	Chargé d’affaires
Alberto de Oliveira		14 January 1935 –22 January 1936	Minister Plenipotentiary, accredited on 31 January 1935
Vasco Francisco Caetano de Quevedo		26 January 1936 –15 August 1940	Minister Plenipotentiary, accredited on 24 March 1934
António Faria Carneiro Pacheco (pt)		30 September 1940 –25 March 1946	Ambassador, accredited on 20 October 1940
Pedro Tovar de Lemos (pt)		4 May 1946 –19 July 1950	Ambassador, accredited on 8 June 1946
José Nosolini Pinto Osório da Silva Leitão		30 October 1950 –19 February 1954	Ambassador, accredited on 23 November 1950
Francisco de Calheiros e Meneses		19 February 1954 –20 January 1958	Ambassador, accredited on 24 February 1954
Vasco Pereira da Cunha		4 February 1958 –19 May 1961	Ambassador, 1958 accredited
António Augusto Braga Leite de Faria		27 June 1961 –25 November 1968	Ambassador, accredited on 7 July 1961
Eduardo Brazão		16 December 1968 –27 April 1974	Ambassador, accredited on 21 December 1968
José Thomaz Cabral Calvet de Magalhães		18 June 1974 –20 September 1980	Ambassador, accredited on 20 August 1974
Gonçalo Luís Maravilhas Correia Caldeira Coelho		1 January 1981 –6 September 1983	Ambassador, accredited on 29 January 1981
João Clara Quintela Paixão		9 June 1983 –21 December 1983	Chargé d’affaires
Helder de Mendonça e Cunha		21 December 1983 –10 April 1986	Ambassador, accredited on 23 December 1983
João de Sá Coutinho Rebelo de Sotto Maior		13 May 1986 –26 January 1993	Ambassador, accredited on 6 June 1986
António Augusto Medeiros Patrício		1993–1996	Ambassador, accredited on 20 February 1993
António D’Oliveira Pinto da França (de)		22 January 1996 –19 October 2000	Ambassador, 1996 accredited
Pedro José Ribeiro de Menezes (de)		31 October 2000 –24 August 2004	Ambassador
João Alberto Bacelar Rocha Páris		17 September 2004 –30 June 2010	Ambassador
Manuel Tomás Fernandes Pereira		27 September 2010 –1 April 2012	Ambassador
Luís Manuel de Magalhães de Albuquerque Veloso		2 April 2012 –11 March 2013	Chargé d’affaires
António Carlos Carvalho de Almeida Ribeiro		11 March 2013 –8 September 2017	Ambassador, accredited on 18 April 2013
António José Emauz de Almeida Lima		18 October 2017 –5 February 2022	Ambassador, accredited on 25 November 2017
Domingos Teixeira de Abreu Fezas Vital		7 February 2022 – 27 August 2025	Ambassador, accredited on 5 March 2022
Maria Amélia Maio de Paiva		from 3 September 2025	Ambassador, accredited on 20 September 2025

== See also ==
- Apostolic Nunciature to Portugal
- Foreign relations of Portugal
- Foreign relations of the Holy See
