= José Luis de Sousa =

Portuguese diplomat

José Luís de Sousa 1st Count of Vila Real
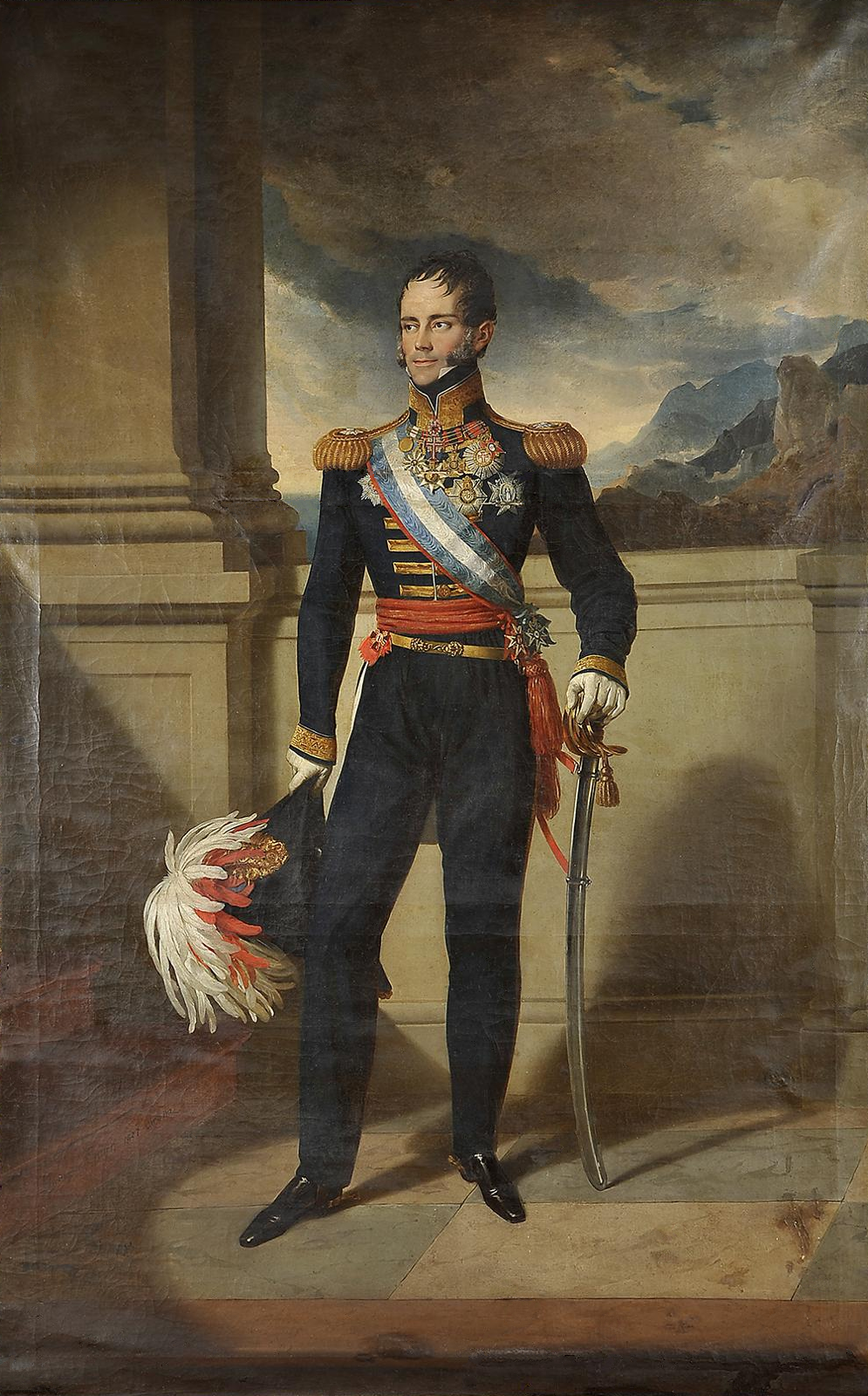
- Portrait by Johann Ender, 1827

Minister of War of Portugal
- Monarch: Miguel I of Portugal
- Preceded by: Cândido José Xavier
- Succeeded by: Diogo de Sousa
- In office 26 February 1828 – 3 March 1828

Minister of Foreign Affairs of Portugal
- In office 24 September 1834 – 16 February 1835
- Preceded by: Agostinho José Freire
- Succeeded by: Pedro de Sousa e Holstein
- In office 28 April 1835 – 27 May 1835
- Preceded by: Pedro de Sousa e Holstein
- Succeeded by: Pedro de Sousa e Holstein
- In office 20 April 1836 – 10 September 1836
- Preceded by: Nuno José Severo de Mendoça Rolim de Moura Barreto
- Succeeded by: Bernardo de Sá Nogueira de Figueiredo
- In office 28 December 1839 – 23 June 1840
- Preceded by: José Travassos Valdez
- Succeeded by: Rodrigo da Fonseca Magalhães

Minister of the Navy of Portugal
- In office 16 February 1835 – 28 April 1835
- Preceded by: Agostinho José Freire
- Succeeded by: Vitório de Sousa Coutinho

Personal details
- Born: 9 February 1785 Lisbon, Portugal
- Died: 26 September 1855 (aged 70) Saint Petersburg, Russia
- Party: Cartista
- Spouse: Teresa de Sousa Holstein
- Parents: D. José Maria de Sousa Botelho Mourão e Vasconcelos (father); D. Maria Teresa de Noronha (mother)
- Education: University of Göttingen
- Profession: Military, diplomat and politician

Dom José Luís de Sousa Botelho Mourão e Vasconcelos, 1st Count of Vila Real ComTE • GCA (Lisbon, 9 February 1785 — Saint Petersburg, 26 September 1855), known before receiving the comital title as D. José Luís de Sousa, was a Portuguese nobleman, military officer, diplomat, and politician. He was a Peer of the Realm, a Councillor of State, and served several times as a minister. He was also morgado of Mateus, Cumeeira, Sabrosa, Arroios, Moraleiros, and Fontelas.

== Biography ==
He was the son of D. José Maria de Sousa Botelho Mourão e Vasconcelos, 5th Morgado of Mateus and his first wife, D. Maria Teresa de Noronha. His paternal grandfather was Luís António de Sousa Botelho Mourão, Captain general of the Captaincy of São Paulo.

He completed his preparatory studies in his home country before enrolling at the University of Göttingen, where he graduated. Although his father intended for him to pursue a career in law, he preferred the military. At the age of seventeen, on 3 April 1802, he enlisted in the Alcântara Cavalry Regiment. He attained the rank of lieutenant but resigned when, after the French invasion, Junot reorganized the Portuguese army, with the intent of sending it to serve in France. As soon as the revolution against foreign rule broke out in Trás-os-Montes, D. José Luís de Sousa stepped forward and took part in the 1808 campaign. In 1809, he served as an aide-de-camp to Viscount Beresford, who held him in high regard for his extensive intellectual cultivation and perfect command of several languages. He distinguished himself so well on the battlefield that, by 1813, he had attained the rank of Lieutenant-colonel.

In 1814, he was first appointed as an Embassy counselor in London, and then Minister plenipotentiary to the court of Madrid, where he rendered valuable service during the critical period from 1814 to 1820. In that year, he proceeded to London to assume the post of Envoy extraordinary and Minister plenipotentiary, until he was dismissed in 1821.

He then returned to Lisbon and took up residence at his estate in Mateus, where he was living when the counter-revolution of 1823 broke out. He promptly aligned himself with the movement, and in recognition of this, King John VI granted him the title of Count of Vila Real (by decree on July 3 of that year), promoted him to the rank of brigadier, and again appointed him as Portugal’s minister in London, a post he held until 1825.

In 1826, he took his seat in the Chamber of Peers, and was tasked by the Infanta Dona Isabel Maria with traveling to Vienna, Austria, to bring back the Infante Dom Miguel. Later, when the Infante staged a coup d'état in 1828, he accepted the portfolio of Minister of War, but resigned shortly thereafter upon observing the direction in which events were unfolding. His temperament did not incline toward absolutism.

Suspected of harboring liberal sympathies, he was forced, like so many others, to go into exile. He remained abroad until 1833, the year he returned to take his seat in the Chamber of Peers. He served in the first cabinet of Queen Maria II, led by the Duke of Palmela, in which he held the portfolio of Foreign Affairs. He was also a member of the cabinet led by the Duke of Terceira, which was toppled by the September Revolution of 1836. A staunch "Cartista" (supporter of the Constitutional Charter), he refused to compromise with the victors and resigned. In 1846, dissatisfied with the political situation, he went abroad once more. He returned in 1854 and delivered a vigorous speech in the Upper House in defense of the Constitutional Charter. The following year, he was appointed as Portugal’s Ambassador to St. Petersburg, where he passed away shortly thereafter.
