= Francisco de Almeida de Melo e Castro, 6th Count of Galveias =

His Excellency The Count of Galveias ComC
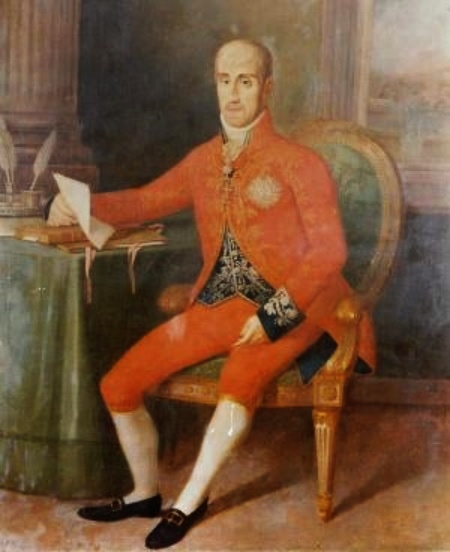

Chief Infirmarer of Saint Joseph's Hospital
- In office 1810–1812
- Preceded by: Lourenço de Lencastre
- Succeeded by: António Armando Saldanha da Câmara

Personal details
- Born: Francisco de Almeida de Melo e Castro; 6 April 1758 Lisbon, Portugal
- Died: 9 March 1819 (aged 60) Rio de Janeiro, Colonial Brazil

D. Francisco de Almeida de Melo e Castro, 6th Count of Galveias (6 April 1758 – 9 March 1819) was a Portuguese nobleman.

Melo e Castro earned a bachelor's degree in Canon Law from the University of Coimbra and held the office of Chief Harbinger (aposentador-mor) of the Royal Household. He was the 1st Lord of Azaruja, Chief Alcaide of Borba, Knight Commander of São Pedro de Monsaraz and São Lourenço de Parada in the Order of Christ, and a member of the Board of the King's Conscience and of the Military Orders.

== Career ==
He held the position of Chief Infirmarer (Enfermeiro-mor) of Saint Joseph's Royal Hospital from 1810 to 1812; under his administration, on the period of relative calm following the French invasions of Portugal in the Peninsular War, he spearheaded extensive works of maintenance and enhancement of the hospital, including a new boundary wall, the embellishment of the exterior with the placement of the statues of the Apostles that had been salvaged from the ruined chapel after the 1755 Lisbon earthquake, and the erection of a triumphal arch over the main entrance — which has the singular distinction of being the only monument in the country celebrating the defeat of General Masséna and the end of the French invasions. As administrator, Melo e Castro was also responsible for the extinction of the teaching of ophthalmology in the hospital as he suppressed the post of ophthalmic surgeon in 1810, citing the lack of need and lack of surgical skill of the incumbent, pioneer ophthalmologist Joaquim José de Santana (who published the first Portuguese treatise on the subject, Elementos de Cirurgia Ocular, 1793).

== Personal life ==
He succeeded his brother João de Almeida de Melo e Castro as Count of Galveias, after his death in 1814. He married, on 1 October 1794, Maria de Monserrate Lobo de Saldanha (1767–1806), daughter and heiress of Martim Lopes Lobo de Saldanha, Chief Alcaide of Castelo Vendoso, Knight Commander of the Order of Christ, and governor and captain-general of the Captaincy of São Paulo in Brazil.

Portuguese nobility
Preceded by João de Almeida de Melo e Castro	Count of Galveias; 1814–1819	Succeeded by António Francisco Lobo de Almeida de Melo e Castro de Saldanha e Beja
