= The Land at the End of the World =

1979 novel by António Lobo Antunes

First edition (publ. Vega)

The Land at the End of the World (pt: Os Cus de Judas, literally The Asses of Judas) is a novel by Portuguese author António Lobo Antunes first published in 1979. It reflects the personal experience of Lobo Antunes as an army doctor sent to Angola during the Portuguese Colonial War. Throughout the book, the reader assumes the position of "interlocutor" to the protagonist, who finds an Angola degraded by colonial conflict, the "unbelievable absurdity of war." The novel touches on several themes: the numberless casualties of war (ignored by the state), disregard for the lives of the innocent (the poor children of Angola and the miserable conditions in which they lived), the protagonist's distance from home, his loss of family ties and fear of death, but above all the nightmarish conditions of colonial occupation and civil war.

This novel was the author's second and in 1987 earned him a prize from the French Embassy in Lisbon.

It was published in English, translated by Margaret Jull Costa in 2011 (Norton: ISBN 9780393077766). An earlier translation by Elizabeth Lowe had been published with the title South of Nowhere.
