= Fado Alexandrino =

1983 novel by António Lobo Antunes

Fado Alexandrino is a novel by Portuguese author António Lobo Antunes. It was published in Portuguese in 1983 and in English translation by Gregory Rabassa in 1990. The novel tells of the reunion of five veterans of Portugal’s Colonial War in Mozambique who meet ten years later for a night of debauchery and share their stories of the intervening years.

== Structure ==
Much of the novel consists of four characters telling their stories to a fifth, known as the Captain, who remains silent for most of the novel. The four are most often referred to as the Soldier, the Lieutenant Colonel, the Communications Officer, and the Second Lieutenant. Each of the novel’s three parts is broken into twelve chapters. In each part, chapters 1, 5, and 9 are centered on the Soldier; 2, 6, and 10 on the Lieutenant Colonel; 3, 7, and 11 on the Communications Officer; and 4, 8, and 12 on the Second Lieutenant. Chapter 11 of Part Three breaks with the format established by the other chapters and will be covered in the plot synopsis.

The novel combines different tenses and points of view in a stream-of-consciousness fashion. Frequently, the character who forms the focus of a particular chapter will begin speaking to the Captain in the present and in the first person, and then his story will switch to the third person as some experience in the past is narrated. Though the “past” begins with the characters’ arrival back in Portugal, earlier incidents, particularly those from the war, are frequently included. Other characters may interject in the first person in the present, offering commentary on another's story. Sometimes one character's story will transition into another character's story. This technique is especially evident in the final chapter, which is the most fragmented and quickly switches voices. Sometimes fantasy elements are introduced as characters imagine possible scenarios.

== Plot ==
Part One: Before the Revolution

The five characters have gathered at a restaurant and are recounting their lives ten years after their return home from Mozambique in 1970. The Soldier, named Abílio, got a job moving furniture for his uncle Ilídio's company. Ilídio had remarried to a woman named Dona Isaura who had a stepdaughter named Odete. The Soldier lived with them and was intrigued by Odete. To gain money to take Odete out, the Soldier started accepting money for sex from a 60-year-old man, a painter.

The Lieutenant Colonel, named Artur, went to seek his wife at a cancer institute only to discover that she had died just before his return. His memories were haunted by an African man he shot. He joined a military regiment and was promoted to the rank of commander. As members of the military conspired to overthrow the government, the Captain, named Mendes, came to the Lieutenant Colonel to try to convince him to join the uprising, but he does not have his troops participate in the revolt.

The Communications Officer, named Celestino, returned to his godmother and a woman named Esmeralda. He joined a Marxist group working to overthrow the government. His contact Olavo got him a job in a ministry so he could infiltrate the government and sway others to his cause. He was put in contact with a young attractive female operative code-named Dália. He was then arrested and brutally tortured by the PIDE.

The Second Lieutenant, named Jorge, reunited with his wife Inês, who came from an upper-class background. He recalls bargaining to buy a young girl in Mozambique who has one miscarriage and one successful birth. He also recalls the difficult courtship with Inês due to the difference in social class. Just before the uprising, the Second Lieutenant had an affair with a woman named Ilda, who got pregnant. He never sees her again after fleeing the country.

In the present time, the five have had quite a bit to drink and make plans to move on to another venue.

Part Two: The Revolution

The 1974 Carnation Revolution provides the backdrop for the events of this part, recounted while the five characters are at a cabaret/brothel. The Soldier witnessed the attack on the PIDE headquarters. He continues to court Odete even as he provided sex for money to the old painter and others. He finally managed to woo Odete and marry her, though Odete was repulsed by what she saw as the Soldier's lack of breeding. Odete left him, and it turns out she was the same woman as Dália, the resistance agent the Communications Officer was enamored with, a revelation hinted at when the Soldier found communist propaganda among Odete's things.

The Lieutenant Colonel was captured and taken to Captain Mendes. As he remained cautious about supporting either the insurrection or the government, he was ejected from the regiment and Captain Mendes was promoted to colonel. He became involved with a woman named Edite, known as the “cloud of perfume.” His first sexual experience with her is marred by impotence, but he later marries her.

The Communications Officer languished in prison as the Revolution occurred. When the prison was liberated he rejoined Dália and the resistance cell. They plan a robbery, which goes awry when the car crashes. Dália informed him of a new plot to dress up like ambassadors and kidnap the president; this plan also failed.

The Revolution brought panic to Inês's family due to their upper class status, so the Second Lieutenant had to go to their home in Carcavelos to comfort them. He discovered Inês having sex with Ilka, a friend of her mother's. The Second Lieutenant fled to São Paulo, Brazil with Inês's family.

In the present, the five plot to take prostitutes back to the Second Lieutenant's residence.

Part Three: After the Revolution

The Soldier and his uncle Ilídio lived alone together after Dona Isaura died and Odete departed to live with Olavo from the organization. The Soldier took over the moving company and had an affair with a concierge.

The Lieutenant Colonel married Edite and was promoted to general and director of a military academy. He started seeing a young salesgirl, Lucília, but was blackmailed by her mother into setting her up in an apartment. He found Lucília cheating on him and cut her off. He also found out that while he was occupied with Lucília Edite had been cheating on him.

The Second Lieutenant divorced Inês, who got custody of their daughter Mariana. He returned from Brazil to Lisbon and took up with a midget.

In the present time, the narratives reveal that the Communications Officer is the one who had an affair with Edite. Talk of killing him emerges among the drunken men. The Soldier suddenly stabs the Communications Officer in the back with a knife. He defends himself and claims it was an accident, but it is implied that he killed the man over Odete. The prostitutes begin complaining about the dead body and all have to decide what to do with the corpse.

Chapter 11 of Part Three breaks with the novel's structure. The chapter should advance the Communication Officer's story, but he is already dead at this point. Instead, we get a first-person narrative from an unnamed female character. She recounts how her father was murdered when she was young. Her mother remarried a man who raped her before she was sent to Lisbon to work as a maid. After the husband of the house died, the woman brought home a boy that the two raised together. The boy grew up to be the Communications Officer, the lady of the house is his godmother, and the woman telling the story is Esmeralda.

The novel wraps up with the group breaking ranks. The police find the body of the Communications Officer, pick up the prostitutes for questioning, and are on the trail of the soldiers.

== Themes ==
The psychology of the military veteran plays a significant role in the novel, and the author carefully depicts the often difficult transition for soldiers returning to civilian life. In Part One images and incidents from the war creep into the narrative with some regularity, suggesting that the soldiers have not yet put the war behind them. A sentence in the first chapter, recounting the Soldier's return, vividly captures this theme: “And he thought I’m in Lisbon and in Mozambique, I can see the houses in the lower middle class neighborhood section and the trees in the jungle at the same time.”

Though superficially the characters are of different ranks, social classes, and political persuasions, they all tend to have similar overall experiences after the war as each one has nothing but difficulties with women and is unable to fully adapt to the new political landscape brought on by the Revolution. The collective identity is emphasized with the intermingling of the characters’ voices and stories. In the final chapters the voices are so intermingled as to be practically indistinguishable. The novel seems to suggest that the characters have been fundamentally shaped by their common experience in the war and can never become a part of normal society again. Although each is given a name, the characters are most often identified by the ranks they held during the war, further implying that their identities were fixed by the experience.

The three parts of the novel are structured around the 1974 Revolution. As the insurrection is spearheaded by military officers, each character has to make a crucial choice on whether to join, resist, or flee when the uprising occurs. Though all of their lives change according to their choices, the consequences tend to flatten out and by the time of the reunion none of them seems to have gained much, suggesting that the Revolution is not as significant to these military men as the war that preceded it.
