= Nuno Brito =

Portuguese diplomat (born 1959)

Nuno Brito GCM
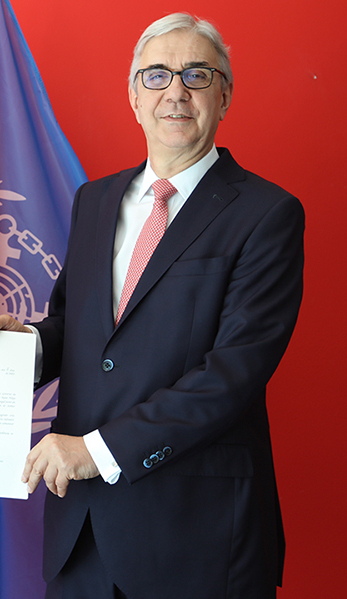
- Brito in 2022

Portuguese Ambassador to the United Kingdom
- Incumbent
- Assumed office 7 April 2022
- Monarchs: Elizabeth II; Charles III
- Preceded by: Manuel Lobo Antunes

Permanent Representative of Portugal to the European Union
- In office October 2015 – March 2022
- Preceded by: Domingos Fezas Vital
- Succeeded by: Pedro Lourtie

Ambassador of Portugal to the United States
- In office 23 February 2011 – 4 October 2015
- Preceded by: João de Vallera
- Succeeded by: Domingos Fezas Vital

Personal details
- Born: Nuno Filipe Alves Salvador e Brito; 5 August 1959 (age 67) Gabela, Portuguese Angola
- Spouse: Rosa Batoréu
- Education: University of Lisbon
- Occupation: Diplomat

Nuno Filipe Alves Salvador e Brito GCM (born 5 August 1959) is a Portuguese career diplomat who has served as Ambassador of Portugal to the United Kingdom since 2022. Over a diplomatic career spanning more than four decades, he was also Permanent Representative of Portugal to the European Union (2015–2022) and Ambassador of Portugal to the United States (2011–2015), and held posts at the United Nations and in the office of the Prime Minister of Portugal.

== Early life and education ==
Brito was born on 5 August 1959 in Gabela, in what was then Portuguese Angola. He graduated in law (legal sciences) from the University of Lisbon in 1984. Shortly afterwards, at the age of 24, he entered the Portuguese diplomatic service, where he initially worked in the American department of the Ministry of Foreign Affairs.

== Diplomatic career ==
=== Early postings ===
Three years after joining the service, Brito was posted to the Embassy of Portugal, Washington, D.C., as embassy secretary, a position he held until 1993. On returning to Lisbon, he joined the office of the Minister of Foreign Affairs until 1995, and that year became chief of staff to the Secretary of State for Defence, António Vitorino.

=== United Nations and roles in Lisbon ===
In 1997, Brito was posted to the Permanent Mission of Portugal to the United Nations in New York, serving as alternate representative on the Security Council, on which Portugal sat as a non-permanent member during the 1997–1998 term. From 1999 he served as deputy ("number two") at the Portuguese mission to the United Nations.

After his time at the United Nations, he returned to Portugal in 2002 as an adviser to the then Prime Minister, José Manuel Barroso, until March 2005. He was subsequently appointed co-chair of the Luso-Spanish Commission for Cross-Border Cooperation and, from 29 September 2005, a member of the Economic and Social Council. From 12 June 2007 he served as Director-General for European Affairs.

=== Ambassador to the United States ===
Brito was appointed Ambassador of Portugal to the United States, based in Washington, D.C., on 7 February 2011, he presented his credentials on 23 February 2011 and held the post until 4 October 2015. By his own account, his work in Washington centred on bilateral diplomacy and on engagement with the large Portuguese community in the country. He was succeeded by Domingos Fezas Vital.

=== Permanent Representative to the European Union ===
From October 2015 to March 2022, Brito was Permanent Representative of Portugal to the European Union, based in Brussels, where he led the Portuguese delegation on COREPER II, the body that prepares the work of the Council of the European Union in the areas of general, economic and financial, external and justice affairs. He held the role during Portugal's presidency of the Council of the European Union in the first half of 2021.

Over his roughly six and a half years leading the Permanent Representation, he took part in around 500 COREPER meetings and more than 50 European Councils, in a period marked by the United Kingdom's withdrawal from the European Union, the COVID-19 pandemic and its economic and financial consequences, and the onset of the war in Ukraine. He was succeeded as Permanent Representative by Pedro Lourtie.

=== Ambassador to the United Kingdom ===
In early 2022, as part of the regular diplomatic rotation, Brito was released from his post in Brussels and appointed Ambassador of Portugal to the United Kingdom, succeeding Manuel Lobo Antunes. He arrived in London in early April 2022 and, on 7 April 2022, presented his credentials to Queen Elizabeth II at Buckingham Palace in a ceremony held remotely but observing the traditional rituals of the British diplomatic corps, including the ambassador's conveyance by royal carriage. Shortly after taking up the post, he took part in the celebrations of the Platinum Jubilee of Queen Elizabeth II.

As ambassador, Brito has worked to strengthen the bilateral relationship between Portugal and the United Kingdom – underpinned by the Anglo-Portuguese Alliance, the oldest active diplomatic alliance in the world – across political, economic, cultural and educational dimensions, as well as supporting the Portuguese community resident in the United Kingdom, estimated at around 450,000 people.

In 2025, Brito made his first official visit to Jersey, where he met government officials and members of the island's resident Portuguese community; the visit included the signing of a new memorandum of understanding extending the provision of Portuguese-language lessons in Jersey schools, delivered by the Camões Institute.

== Personal life ==
Brito is married to Rosa Batoréu, also a career diplomat, who has served as Portugal's representative to UNESCO in Paris.

== Honours ==
- Grand Officer of the Order of the Southern Cross (Brazil, 16 September 2003)
- Silver Grand Cross of the Decoration of Honour for Services to the Republic of Austria (11 November 2004)
- Grand Cross of the Order of Merit of Chile (31 August 2010)
- Grand Cross of the Order of Merit of Portugal (21 March 2011)
- Grand Cross of the Order of Rio Branco (Brazil, 25 November 2021)

Diplomatic posts
Preceded by João de Vallera	Ambassador of Portugal to the United States; 2011–2015	Succeeded by Domingos Fezas Vital
Preceded by Domingos Fezas Vital	Permanent Representative of Portugal to the European Union; 2015–2022	Succeeded by Pedro Lourtie
Preceded by Manuel Lobo Antunes	Ambassador of Portugal to the United Kingdom; 2022–present	Incumbent
