= Domingos Fezas Vital =

Portuguese diplomat (born 1958)

His Excellency Domingos Fezas Vital GOC GCIH ComIH
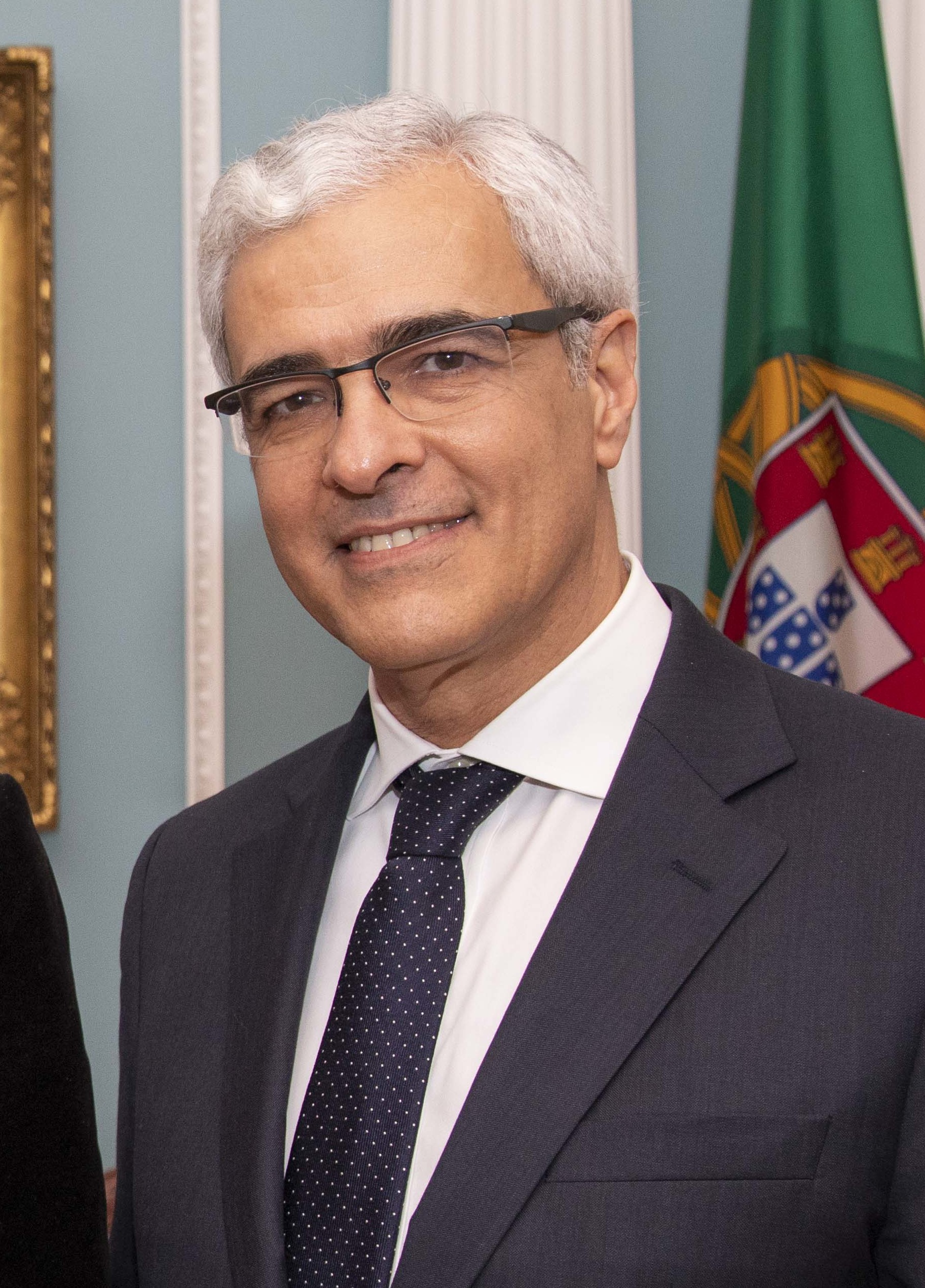

Portuguese Ambassador to the Holy See & Portuguese Ambassador to the Sovereign Order of Malta
- In office 16 December 2021 – 23 May 2025
- President: Marcelo Rebelo de Sousa
- Prime Minister: António Costa; Luís Montenegro
- Preceded by: António de Almeida Lima
- Succeeded by: Maria Amélia Paiva

Portuguese Ambassador to the United States
- In office 10 September 2015 – 16 December 2021
- President: Aníbal Cavaco Silva; Marcelo Rebelo de Sousa
- Prime Minister: Pedro Passos Coelho; António Costa
- Preceded by: Nuno Brito
- Succeeded by: Francisco António Duarte Lopes

Portuguese Ambassador to The Bahamas
- Incumbent
- Assumed office 13 March 2017
- President: Marcelo Rebelo de Sousa
- Prime Minister: António Costa

Permanent Representative of Portugal to the European Union
- In office 19 March 2012 – 10 September 2015
- President: Aníbal Cavaco Silva; Marcelo Rebelo de Sousa
- Prime Minister: Pedro Passos Coelho; António Costa

Personal details
- Born: Domingos Teixeira de Abreu Fezas Vital; 27 September 1958 Luanda, Portuguese Angola
- Spouse: Isabel Maria Rito de Oliveira Afonso de Fezas Vital
- Children: 2

Domingos Fezas Vital GOC, GCIH, ComIH (born 27 September 1958) is a Portuguese diplomat. He served as Portuguese Ambassador to the United States from September 2015 to December 2021 and to The Bahamas. Currently he is the Portuguese Ambassador to the Holy See and to the Sovereign Order of Malta.

== Career ==
Fezas Vital graduated from Federal University of Rio de Janeiro, Brazil, with a bachelor's degree in social and judicial sciences. He then studied international trade at the Free University of Brussels. Shortly after, in 1983, he joined the Portuguese Ministry of Foreign Affairs, where he started his diplomatic career as an attaché.

Throughout his diplomatic career Fezas Vital has held posts not only in embassies but also in international organisations, which Portugal is a member in, namely as a Portuguese representative to NATO and the Western European Union.

In 1996, three years before transfer of sovereignty over Macau, he was appointed diplomatic adviser to Governor Vasco Joaquim Rocha Vieira.

After his posting in Macau, Ambassador Fezas Vital returned to Portugal to work in the Ministry of Foreign Affairs until he was appointed Consul General of Portugal in São Paulo in 2000.

In 2010, he was appointed Ambassador and in March 2012 he became the Representative of Portugal to the European Union, a post he held until being posted to the US as Ambassador of Portugal. After serving in the United States, Domingos Fezas Vital was appointed, in 2021, Portuguese Ambassador to the Holy See, a post he would hold until 2025 due to age limit.

== Honours ==
=== National honours ===
- Commander of the Order of Prince Henry (7 December 1987)
- Grand Officer of the Order of Christ (26 March 2012)
- Grand-Cross of the Order of Prince Henry (9 April 2012)

=== Foreign honours ===
- Officer of the Order of Rio Branco, Brazil (27 April 1987)
- Commander of the Order of Civil Merit, Spain (20 March 1989)
- Commander by Number of the Order of Isabella the Catholic, Spain (30 November 2007)
- Commander First Class of the Order of the Polar Star, Sweden (9 May 2008)
- Commander's Cross with Star of the Order of Merit of the Republic of Poland, Poland (3 March 2009)
- Grand Officer of the Order of Merit of the Federal Republic of Germany, Germany (26 May 2009)
- Grand Officer of the Order of the Star of Jordan, Jordan (28 May 2009)
- Commander with Star of the Royal Norwegian Order of Merit, Norway (25 September 2009)
- Grand Officer of the Order of Bernardo O'Higgins, Chile (14 July 2010)
- Grand Officer of the Pontifical Equestrian Order of St. Gregory the Great, Holy See (3 September 2010)
- Grand-Cross of the Civilian Class of the Order pro Merito Melitensi, Sovereign Military Hospitaller Order of Saint John of Jerusalem of Rhodes and of Malta (23 November 2010)
- Grand Cross of the Order of Merit of the Grand Duchy of Luxembourg, Luxembourg (26 December 2010)

== Publications ==
- Why the U.S. and Europe need each other, now more than ever, with Kirsti Kauppi, The Dallas Morning News, 2019
