= Luís Pinto de Soveral, 1st Marquis of Soveral =

Luis Maria Augusto Pinto de Soveral, Marquês de Soveral GCMG GCVO (28 May 1851 – 5 October 1922) was a Portuguese diplomat. Kaiser Wilhelm II nicknamed him "the Blue Monkey".

1907 caricature by Max Beerbohm

(...) the notorious Marquis de Soveral, who represented Portugal. An intimate friend of King Edward, he was known as the "Blue Monkey" in London society where it was said, "he made love to all the most beautiful women and all the nicest men were his friends." (...)

— Barbara Tuchman, The Proud Tower, p.283, The Macmillan Company, New York City, 1962, available here https://archive.org/details/in.ernet.dli.2015.214565

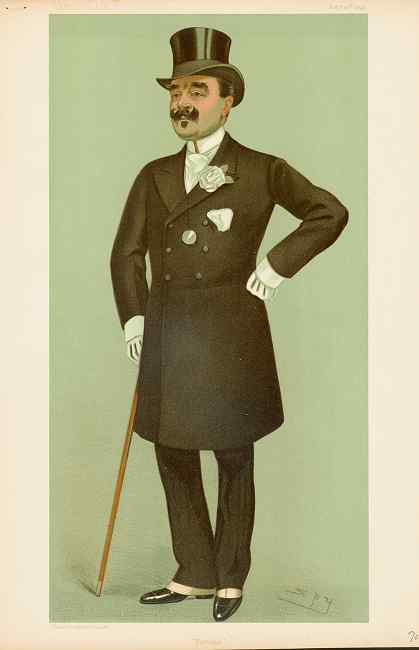
1898 caricature by Leslie Ward

He was born at São João da Pesqueira, son of Eduardo Pinto de Soveral, 1st Viscount of São Luís, and his wife Maria da Piedade Paes de Sande e Castro.

Joining the diplomatic service, he was an attaché and Secretary of Legation at Vienna, Berlin, and Madrid. He was First Secretary at the London Embassy in 1885 and advanced to the rank of Minister in 1891. He was a Counsellor of State, and served as Minister of Foreign Affairs from 1895 to 1897.

In 1897 he was made an Honorary Knight Grand Cross of the British Order of St Michael and St George, and later that year was appointed Envoy Extraordinary and Minister Plenipotentiary to the Court of St James's. Soveral was a friend of the Prince of Wales (later Edward VII) and a prominent member of the "Marlborough House set", the group of aristocratic and other friends of Edward when Prince of Wales who were regarded as leading fashionable society, at a time when the royal court of Queen Victoria was sober and domestic in tone. He was Ambassador Extraordinary for Edward VII's coronation and was made an Honorary Grand Cross of the Royal Victorian Order in 1902. He was Ambassador Extraordinary to the Second Hague Conference in 1907. His tenure as Portuguese Minister in London ended in 1910, when the Revolution of 5 October overthrew the Portuguese monarchy.

Soveral was created a Marquis by King Carlos I of Portugal in 1900, and was a Grand Cross of the Order of the Tower and Sword. He died at Paris. On his death, his title became extinct. He is buried in the Pere Lachaise cemetery (Division 20), in Paris.

He was the subject of a biography by Paulo Lowndes Marques, entitled O Marquês de Soveral, Seu Tempo e Seu Modo (The Marquis of Soveral: his time and his manner).
