= Pedro Lobo =

Brazilian photographer (born 1854)

Pedro Lobo (born 1954) is a Brazilian photographer, who lives in Portugal.

== Earlupy life and education ==
Lobo was born in 1954 in Rio de Janeiro.

Lobo, a Fulbright scholar, has studied photography at the school of the Boston Museum of Fine Arts de with Elaine O'Neil and Bill Burke and at New York's International Center of Photography (ICP).

== Career ==
He has exhibited his work in Brazil, Denmark, Germany, Colombia and in the United States. His interest in popular architecture as a construction of human individuality has led him to photograph slums (or favelas) and prisons such as the one in São Paulo known as Carandiru (later demolished). The latter pictures were shown in the exhibition Imprisoned spaces/Espaços aprisionados at Blue Sky Gallery, in Portland, Oregon, in 2005.

His first one-man show in Portugal was Favelas: Architecture of Survival at Museu Municipal Prof. Joaquim Vermelho in 2009 in Estremoz, later exhibited in Galeria 3+1 in Lisbon.

In 2010, the Art Institute of Charleston partnered with the Halsey Institute of Contemporary Art at the College of Charleston and the City of Charleston Office of Cultural Affairs to bring Lobo to Charleston, South Carolina, as their first international artist in residence. Lobo presented several lectures to Art Institute of Charleston photography students and took them on a guided tour of his solo exhibition at The City Gallery at Waterfront Park.

In 2011, his series on contemporary religion In Nomine Fidei was shown at Hellerau Festspielhaus, in Dresden, Germany.

Lobo has taken part in other exhibitions such as REtalhar2007 in Centro Cultural do Banco do Brasil in Rio de Janeiro and Via BR 040 – Serra Cerrado, with Miguel Rio Branco, Elder Rocha, etc. in Plataforma Contemporânea of the Museu Imperial of Petropolis, in 2004 and 2005.

From 1978 to 1985, he worked for the Brazilian Landmark Commission (Fundação Pró-Memória) as a photographer and researcher.

In 2008, he was awarded the first prize at Tops Festival in China.

== Bibliography ==
- Magalhães, Angela e Nadja Fonseca Peregrino "Fotografia no Brasil", Rio de Janeiro: Funarte, 2004. ISBN 85-85781-96-3, pp. 352–353
- Fonseca, Nicky Baendereck Coelho e Nirlando Beirão "Rio/Sao: doze visões de duas cidades maravilhosas", São Paulo: Formarte, 2003.
- Richa, Arnaldo Chain (org.) "O Pão de Açucar de cada vida" Rio de Janeiro: Oficina da Festa, 1999. ISBN 85-87633-01-5
- Ziff, Trisha "Che Guevara: revolutionary & icon" New York: Abrams Image, ISBN 0-8109-5718-3, fotografia p. 64
