= João de Vallera =

Portuguese diplomat (born 1950)

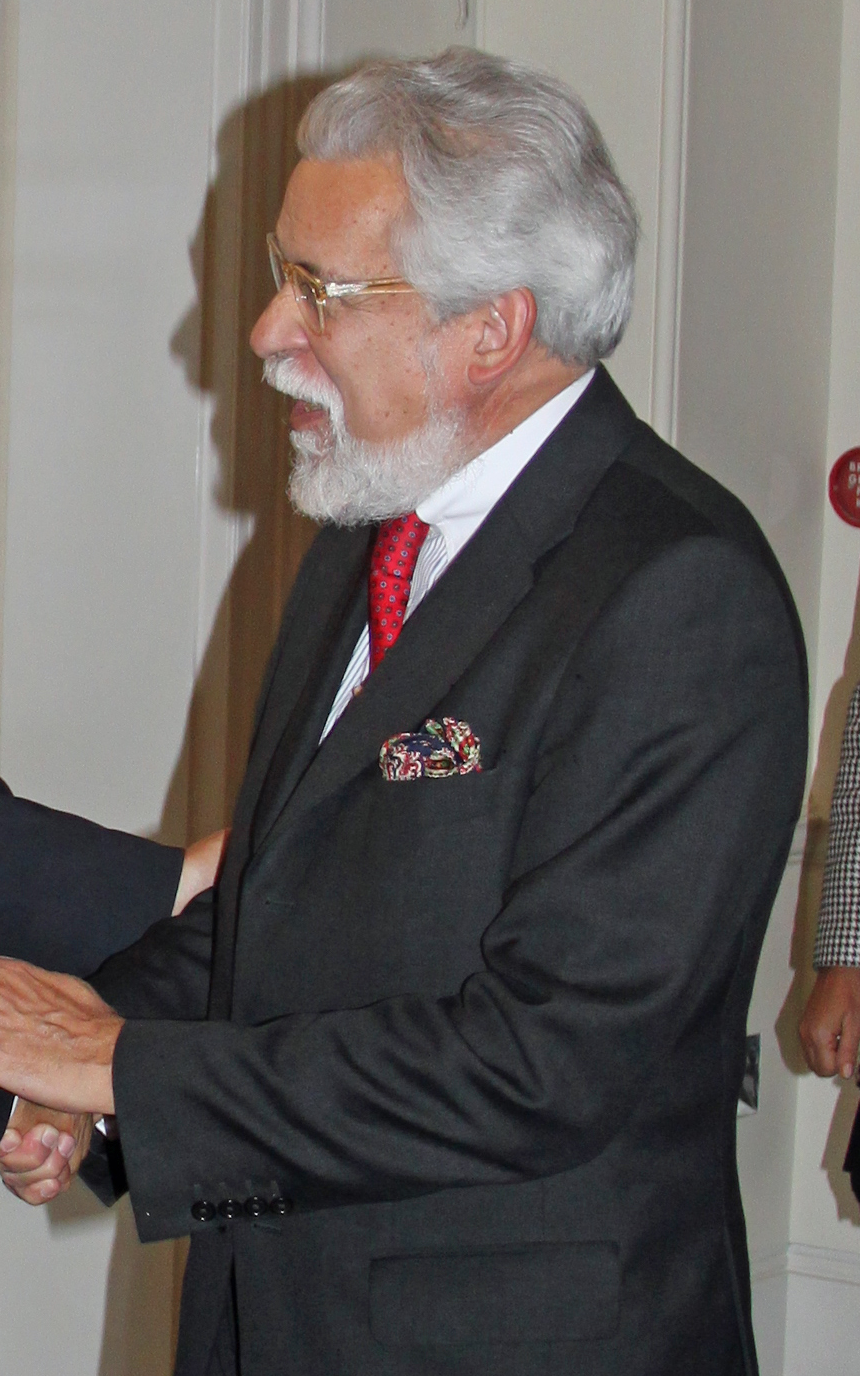

Portuguese Ambassador to the United Kingdom
- In office 19 January 2011 – 30 July 2016
- Preceded by: António Santana Carlos
- Succeeded by: Manuel Lobo Antunes

Personal details
- Born: 1 June 1950 (age 76) Malange, Angola
- Education: University of Lisbon

João de Vallera (born 1 June 1950) is a Portuguese diplomat. Born in Angola, de Vallera spent 15 years in Brussels working for the European Union before becoming a diplomat. He has served as Portugal's ambassador to Ireland (1998–2001), Germany (2002–07), the United States (2007–2010), and the United Kingdom (2011–2016).

He was a recipient of the Grand Cross of the Order of Merit (Portugal) on 23 July 1998.

Political offices
Preceded by António Santana Carlos	Portuguese Ambassador to the United Kingdom; 2011–2016	Succeeded by Manuel Lobo Antunes
