= Manuel Lobo Antunes =

Portuguese lawyer and diplomat (born 1958)

Manuel Lobo Antunes ComIH GCIH ComM
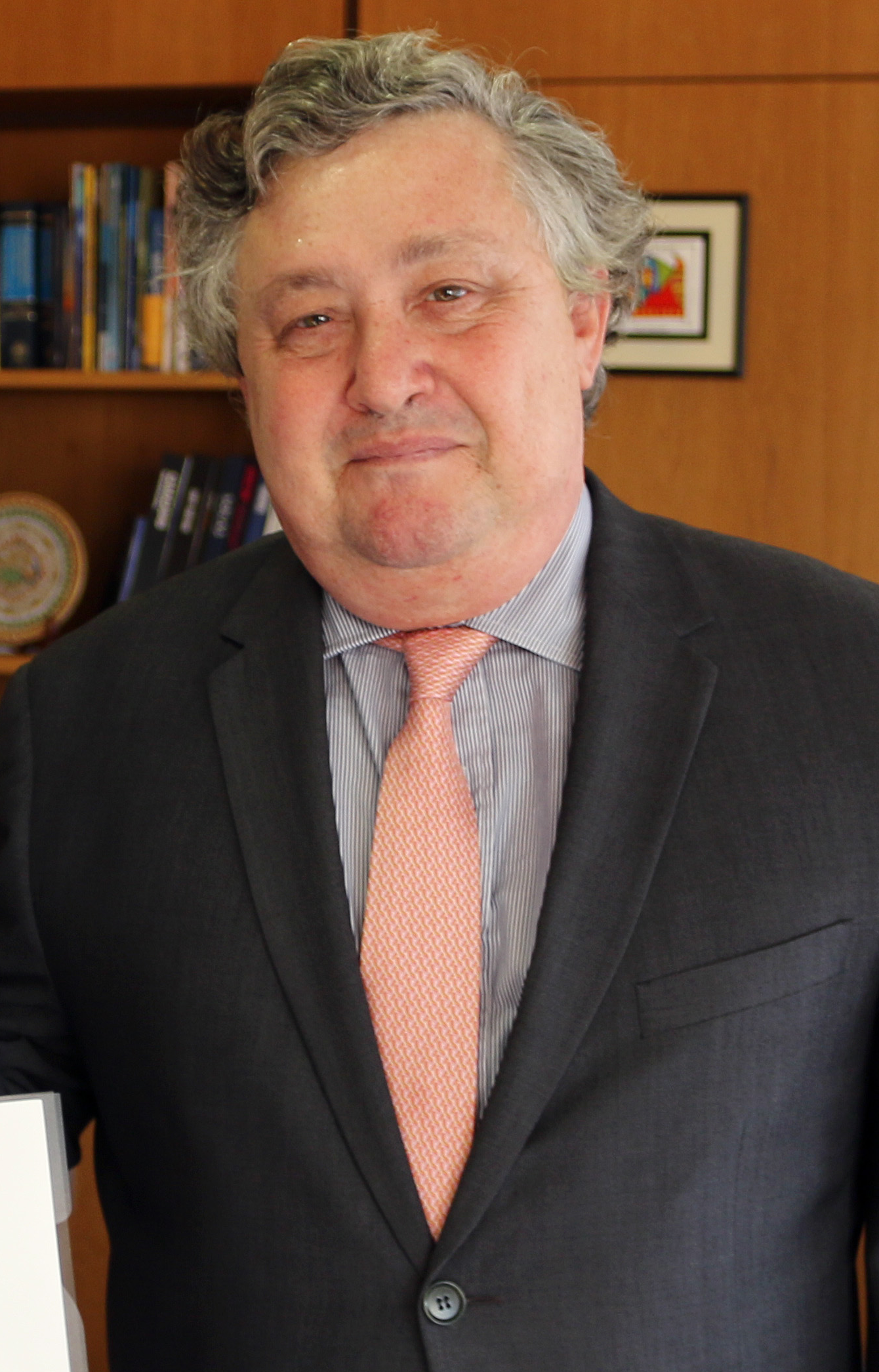
- Lobo Antunes in 2016

Permanent Representative of Portugal at the Organisation for Economic Cooperation and Development
- Incumbent
- Assumed office April 2022

Personal details
- Born: 27 June 1958 (age 68) Lisbon, Portugal
- Relatives: António Lobo Antunes (brother); João Lobo Antunes (brother)
- Education: Catholic University of Portugal

Manuel Lobo Antunes ComIH GCIH ComM (born 27 June 1958) is a Portuguese lawyer and diplomat. He was Portugal's Ambassador in London from 2016 to 2022. He is currently Portugal's Permanent Representative to the Organization for Economic Cooperation and Development (OECD).

== Early life and education ==
Born on 27 June 1958 in Lisbon and in raised in a medical family, his father was a highly esteemed Professor of Neurology in Lisbon. Antunes was one of six sons, with brothers including writer António Lobo Antunes and late neurosurgeon João Lobo Antunes.

Antunes studied law at the Catholic University of Portugal, after which he studied European affairs at the same institution. Following his graduation, Antunes applied to the Portuguese Ministry of Foreign Affairs aged 25.

== Early career ==
Antunes began his career as a diplomatic adviser to President António Ramalho Eanes in 1984.

In 1988 Antunes left Portugal to take up his first overseas posting as a secretary in the Portuguese Mission to the Hague, before being sent to Harare, Zimbabwe as a councillor.

In 1996 he moved back to Lisbon as director for Sub-Saharan African affairs, and held various other positions in the Portuguese Ministry of Foreign Affairs including diplomatic adviser to Prime Minister António Guterres in (2001–02), director general for EU affairs (2004–05), and deputy representative to the convention on the Future of Europe.

== Time in government ==
Upon the election of the government of José Socrates in 2005, Antunes was asked to serve as Secretary of State for National Defence and Sea.

In mid-2006 it was announced that Antunes would move from the Ministry of National Defence to the Portuguese Foreign Affairs Department as Secretary of State for European Affairs, where he oversaw Portugal's presidency of the European Union, and was one of the main negotiators of the final phase of the Treaty of Lisbon.

== Post-government ==
Antunes announced in 2008 that he would leave frontline politics and revert to a diplomatic career, and was accordingly appointed as the Permanent Representative of Portugal to the European Union, a senior diplomatic post he held until 2012.

Following this post he was deployed to Rome as Ambassador to Italy for four years, before moving to London in 2016 as Portugal's Ambassador to the United Kingdom.

== Personal life ==
Antunes is married to his wife, Maria, with whom he has five children. He speaks English and Italian, alongside his native Portuguese.

Political offices
Preceded by João de Vallera	Portuguese Ambassador to the United Kingdom; 2016–2022	Succeeded by Nuno Brito
