= Mary Kay Lobo =

American psychiatric neuroscientist

- Born: 1975 (age 50–51)
- Education: University of California, Los Angeles
- Scientific career
- Workplaces: University of Maryland School of Medicine
- Thesis: Genetic analyses of striatal projection neuron subtypes in the direct and indirect pathways (2007)

Mary Kay Lobo (born 1975) is an American psychiatric neuroscientist who is a Professor of Neurobiology at the University of Maryland School of Medicine. Her research considers the molecular mechanisms that underpin drug addiction and depression. She was named a finalist in the 2011 Blavatnik Awards for Young Scientists.

== Early life and education ==
Lobo was born and raised in Los Angeles. She studied biology and anthropology at the University of California, Los Angeles. She stayed in California for her doctoral research, where she completed genetic analysis of neuron subtypes. To achieve this, she had to develop a novel methodology for isolating the main striatal projection neuron subtypes (medium spiny neurons). These two neuron play opposite but complementary roles in neural circuitry. She worked in the laboratory of X. William Yang in the David Geffen School of Medicine at UCLA. Lobo was a postdoctoral researcher at the University of Texas Southwestern Medical Center where she worked in the laboratory of Eric J. Nestler.

== Research and career ==
In 2011 Lobo was appointed to the faculty at the University of Maryland School of Medicine. She has continued to make use of genetic analysis to understand how neuronal circuits are involved with drug addiction and depression. In such scenarios, the circuits become dysfunctional, influencing downstream brain region. By combining genetic analysis with optogenetic, Lobo has identified divergent roles in nucleus accumbens projection neurons in the brain's reward centre. She showed that the molecular regulator of mitochondrial fission is amplified in the brain reward regions of individuals dependent on cocaine, and that blocking this fission process can reduce cocaine-seeking behaviour.

Lobo investigated effective medications and molecular targets for major depressive disorders. To achieve this, she uses mouse models of depression. She showed that chronic stress decreases the number of dendrites and size of nerve cells in mice, which limits the number of connections with nearby nerve cells. She proposed that the small transforming protein RhoA, which is involved the maintenance of dendrite shape and size, and its molecular target rho-associated protein kinase (ROCK), offer hope for the restoration of brain function in people with major depressive disorders. The use of RhoA inhibitors can result in antidepressant like responses to stress.

== Academic service ==
Lobo was made associate editor of The Journal of Neuroscience in 2014. She serves on the editorial board of ACS Chemical Neuroscience and Biological Psychiatry.

== Awards and honors ==
- 2006 University of California, Los Angeles Eva Mary Kavan Prize
- 2011 Blavatnik Award for Young Scientist Finalist
- 2016 IMHRO/ Janssen Rising Star Translational Research Awardee
- 2016 American College of Neuropsychopharmacology Associate Member
- 2017 Presidential Early Career Award for Scientists and Engineers

== Selected publications ==
- Chaudhury, Dipesh; Walsh, Jessica J.; Friedman, Allyson K.; Juarez, Barbara; Ku, Stacy M.; Koo, Ja Wook; Ferguson, Deveroux; Tsai, Hsing-Chen; Pomeranz, Lisa; Christoffel, Daniel J.; Nectow, Alexander R. (2013). "Rapid regulation of depression-related behaviours by control of midbrain dopamine neurons". Nature. 493 (7433): 532–536. doi:10.1038/nature11713. ISSN 1476-4687. PMC 3554860. PMID 23235832.
- Lobo, Mary Kay; Covington, Herbert E.; Chaudhury, Dipesh; Friedman, Allyson K.; Sun, HaoSheng; Damez-Werno, Diane; Dietz, David M.; Zaman, Samir; Koo, Ja Wook; Kennedy, Pamela J.; Mouzon, Ezekiell (2010-10-15). "Cell Type–Specific Loss of BDNF Signaling Mimics Optogenetic Control of Cocaine Reward". Science. 330 (6002): 385–390. doi:10.1126/science.1188472. ISSN 0036-8075. PMC 3011229. PMID 20947769.
- Covington, Herbert E.; Lobo, Mary Kay; Maze, Ian; Vialou, Vincent; Hyman, James M.; Zaman, Samir; LaPlant, Quincey; Mouzon, Ezekiel; Ghose, Subroto; Tamminga, Carol A.; Neve, Rachael L. (2010-12-01). "Antidepressant Effect of Optogenetic Stimulation of the Medial Prefrontal Cortex". Journal of Neuroscience. 30 (48): 16082–16090. doi:10.1523/JNEUROSCI.1731-10.2010. ISSN 0270-6474. PMC 3004756. PMID 21123555.
