= Emiro Lobo =

Venezuelan artist (1948–2007)

Emiro Lobo (1948–2007) was a Venezuelan painter, graphic artist, and designer.

== Awards and recognitions ==
- Michelena Hall Award, Caracas.
- 2nd National Design Award in Mérida. CONAC.
- I CONAC Hall Award "Chorus City" (1991).
- Special Award, Lifetime Achievement Tribute I Lounge "Maria Luisa de Urbina Schirripa".
- I Prize Drawing Room Small Format, Mérida, Mérida State (1996).
- First Prize II Lounge "Cementos Caribe" (1990).
- Second Prize, I Hall West, Mérida, Mérida State (1980).
- Art Salon Prize Paraguaná Falcón State. Landscape mode (1981).
- Second Prize Drawing III Hall West, Mérida (1982).
