= Agostinho José Freire =

Portuguese statesman

Agostinho José Freire ComTE, CvA, GCNSC
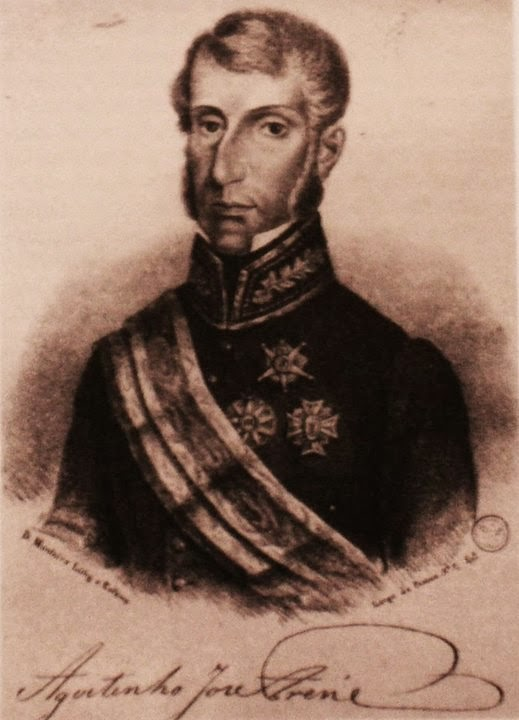
- Born: August 28, 1780; Évora, Portugal
- Died: November 4, 1836 (aged 56); Lisbon, Portugal
- Cause of death: murdered during the Belenzada
- Burial place: Prazeres Cemetery
- Education: University of Coimbra
- Occupations: soldier, statesman
- Father: captain Agostinho José Freire

Agostinho José Freire ComTE, CvA, GCNSC (28 August 1780 – 4 November 1836 ) was a major of the Portuguese Army, minister and state councilor, a distinguished statesman and advocate of the Liberal cause.

== Early life ==
He was born in Évora on August 28, 1780, son of captain Agostinho José Freire, from Vidais and of an unknown mother. While still young, he went to live in Leiria, accompanied by his father. Having completed his early studies there, he went to Lisbon to pursue his education and eventually enrolled at the University of Coimbra. He graduated in Mathematics in 1807, having also studied Philosophy.

Although he seemed destined for a teaching career, the French invasion in the year of his graduation saw him dedicate himself to the resistance. He fought in the Peninsular War and played a role during the Vintismo period and in the early years of the Portuguese Constitutional Monarchy. He was also a freemason.

As a result of the Vilafrancada uprising, Freire went into exile on June 15, 1822. He went first to Jersey, then to Paris and elsewhere in Europe. He returned to Portugal following the Constitutional Charter of 1826. He served in the army throughout the Liberal Wars. When Miguel I of Portugal landed in Portugal in 1828 as regent, Freire once again left the country and went to join Pedro IV in Belle-Isle, leaving with him for the Azores. Pedro named him Minister of War and acting Navy. After having rendered Pedro very important services in organizing the liberal army and preparing the fleet that was to transport him to the Portugal, Freire returned with Pedro and distinguished himself in the military action that followed.

== Ministerial career ==
In the regency cabinet of Don Pedro he was Minister of War (3 March 1832 - 24 September 1834) and Interim Minister of the Marine (3 March - 29 June 1832, 26 July - 15 October 1833) as well as interim Foreign Minister (29 July 1832 - 25 September 1832 and 18 November 1832 - 12 January 1833); Minister of the Marine for a third time (24 September 1834 - 16 February 1835) and then Minister of the Interior (16 February - 27 May 1835) in the Palmela cabinet and again (20 April - 10 September 1836) in the Terceira cabinet.

== Honours and distinctions ==
He was awarded the 36th Grand Cross of the Order of Our Lady of the Conception of Vila Viçosa (December 1, 1834); the Grand Cross of the Order of Charles III of Spain (28th August 1834): Knight of the Military Order of Avis, Commander of the Military Order of the Tower and Sword (31 January 1835), President of the Constituent Cortes, peer of the realm and director of the Royal Military College.

== Death ==
Freire was murdered in Lisbon during the Belenzada, after leaving the house of pt:João Baptista Felgueiras, where he had gone to dinner, and was making his way to the Belém Palace. Various former devorist ministers had been called to Belém to assist the new government and Freire was in a carriage, wearing his full regalia. On his way, at Calçada da Pampulha in Santos he ran into a group of the National Guard. He stepped out of his carriage and was shot by a guardsman. The furious mob tore off his decorations, robbed his valuables, and dumped his body in a common grave at a cemetery. His body was mutilated and stolen, being taken to Prazeres Cemetery. Even after he was buried, his remains were twice dug up by his enemies, so in the end his daughter had a mausoleum built to keep his remains secure.
