= António Lobo Antunes =

Portuguese novelist (1942–2026)

António Lobo Antunes GCSE
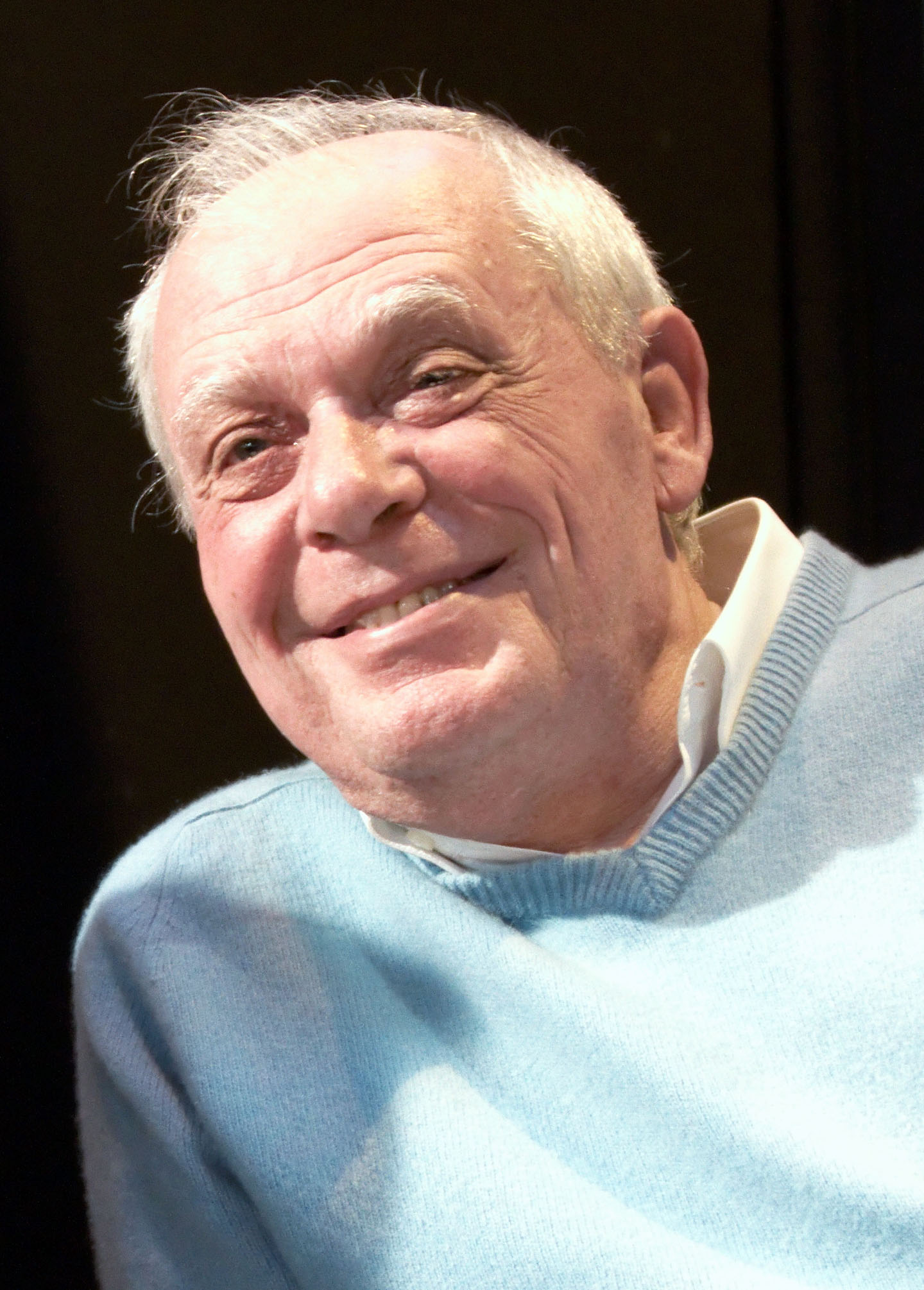
- Lobo Antunes in 2010
- Born: 1 September 1942; Lisbon, Portugal
- Died: 5 March 2026 (aged 83); Lisbon, Portugal
- Education: University of Lisbon
- Occupations: Novelist, short-story writer, psychiatrist
- Children: 3
- Relatives: João Lobo Antunes (brother); Manuel Lobo Antunes (brother)
- Awards: Camões Award (2007)
- Military career
- Allegiance: Portugal
- Branch: Portuguese Army
- Service years: 1970–1973
- Rank: Lieutenant, military doctor
- Conflicts: Portuguese Colonial War: Angolan War of Independence

António Lobo Antunes GCSE (European Portuguese: [ɐ̃ˈtɔni.u ˈloβu ɐ̃ˈtunɨʃ, ɐ̃ˈtɔnju -]; 1 September 1942 – 5 March 2026) was a Portuguese novelist and medical doctor. He was awarded the 2000 Austrian State Prize, the 2003 Ovid Prize, the 2005 Jerusalem Prize, the 2007 Camões Prize, and the 2008 Juan Rulfo Prize. Lobo Antunes was repeatedly nominated as a contender for the Nobel Prize in Literature.

== Life and career ==
António Lobo Antunes was born in Lisbon on 1 September 1942 as the eldest of six sons of João Alfredo de Figueiredo Lobo Antunes, prominent neurologist and professor, close collaborator of António Egas Moniz, Nobel Prize winner in physiology, and wife Margareida de Almeida Lima. He was the brother of João Lobo Antunes and Manuel Lobo Antunes. According to Lobo Antunes, he was of German descent through his father and of Jewish descent through his maternal grandfather. In one interview, he stated that his mother's family came from Brazil; in another, he stated that it was his father who was of Brazilian origin.

He studied at the University of Lisbon. He graduated as a medical doctor in 1969, later specializing in psychiatry.

By the end of his education, Lobo Antunes had to serve with the Portuguese Army to take part in the Portuguese Colonial War (1961–1974). In a military hospital in Angola, he became interested in the subjects of death and "the other." Lobo Antunes came back from Africa in 1973. His experience in Africa shaped his literary career- according to The New York Times, he "charted Portugal’s halting emergence from the crippling dictatorship of Dr. António de Oliveira Salazar from 1932 to 1968, and its failed colonial wars in Africa."

He began to write at the age of 13 or 14. His first novel was rejected for more than 3 years by various publishers. In 1979, Lobo Antunes published his first novels, Memória de Elefante (Elephant's Memory) and Os Cus de Judas; in 1980, he published another novel, Conhecimento do Inferno. He practised psychiatry as well, mainly at the Hospital Miguel Bombarda of Lisbon, leaving in 1985 to dedicate himself to literature.

He published more than twenty novels, among the most important are Fado Alexandrino (1983), As Naus (1988) and O Manual dos Inquisidores (1996). His works have been translated into more than thirty languages.

== Personal life and death ==
=== Relationships ===
Lobo Antunes was married three times. He married his first wife Maria José Xavier da Fonseca e Costa in 1970, by whom he had two daughters: Maria José Lobo Antunes and Joana Lobo Antunes. His second wife was Maria João Espírito Santo Bustorff Silva, by whom he had one daughter, Maria Isabel Bustorff Lobo Antunes. In 2010, he married Cristina Ferreira de Almeida.

=== Health ===
In 2007, Lobo Antunes revealed that he had been operated for intestinal cancer. He suffered from progressive dementia, which forced him to give up both his long-standing smoking habit and his writing. He died on 5 March 2026, at the age of 83, with a national day of mourning declared on 7 March. His funeral was held at the Jerónimos Monastery on 7 March. Portuguese president Marcelo Rebelo de Sousa honored him with a posthumous Order of Camões.

== Awards ==
- Grande Prémio de Romance e Novela APE/IPLB (1985 and 1999)
- The Austrian State Prize for European Literature (2000)
- Ovid Prize, Romania (2003)
- Latin Union International Prize (2003)
- Military Order of Saint James of the Sword (2004)
- Jerusalem Prize (2005)
- Premio José Donoso (2006)
- Camões Prize (2007)
- Juan Rulfo Premio de Literatura en Lengua Romances (2008)
- France Commandeur de l'Ordre des Arts et des Lettres (2008)
- Prémio Autores, Literature
- International Nonino Prize (2014)
- Premio Internazionale Bottari Lattes Grinzane (2018)
- Order of Liberty (2019)
- Order of Camões (2026, posthumous)

== Bibliography ==
Novels

- Memória de Elefante (1979)
- Os Cus de Judas (1979). Translated by Elizabeth Lowe as South of Nowhere (1983); and later by Margaret Jull Costa as The Land at the End of the World (2011).
- Conhecimento do Inferno (1980)
- Explicação dos Pássaros (1981)
- Fado Alexandrino (1983). Fado Alexandrino, trans. Gregory Rabassa (1990).
- Auto dos Danados (1985). Act of the Damned, trans. Richard Zenith (1993).
- As Naus (1988). The Return of the Caravels, trans. Gregory Rabassa (2003).
- Tratado das Paixões da Alma (1990)
- A Ordem Natural das Coisas (1992)
- A Morte de Carlos Gardel (1994)
- O Manual dos Inquisidores (1996). The Inquisitors' Manual, trans. Richard Zenith (2004).
- O Esplendor de Portugal (1997). The Splendor of Portugal, trans. Rhett McNeil (2011).
- Exortação aos Crocodilos (1999).
- Não Entres Tão Depressa Nessa Noite Escura (2000).
- Que Farei Quando Tudo Arde? (2001).
- Boa Tarde às Coisas Aqui em Baixo (2003)
- Eu Hei-de Amar uma Pedra (2004)
- Ontem Não te vi em Babilónia (2006)
- O Meu Nome é Legião (2007)
- O Arquipélago da Insónia (2008)
- Que Cavalos São Aqueles Que Fazem Sombra no Mar? (2009)
- Sôbolos Rios Que Vão (2010). By the Rivers of Babylon, trans. Margaret Jull Costa (2023).
- Comissão das Lágrimas (2011)
- Não é Meia-Noite quem quer (2012). Midnight Is Not in Everyone's Reach, trans. Elizabeth Lowe (2025).
- Caminha Como Numa Casa em Chamas (2014)
- Da Natureza dos Deuses (2015)
- Para Aquela que Está Sentada no Escuro à Minha Espera (2016)
- Até Que as Pedras Se Tornem Mais Leves Que a Água (2016). Until Stones Become Lighter Than Water, trans. Jeff Love (2019).
- A Última Porta Antes da Noite (2018)
- A Outra Margem do Mar (2019)
- Diccionario da Linguagem das Flores (2020)
- O Tamanho do Mundo (2022)
