= João Lobo Antunes =

Portuguese neurosurgeon (1944–2016)

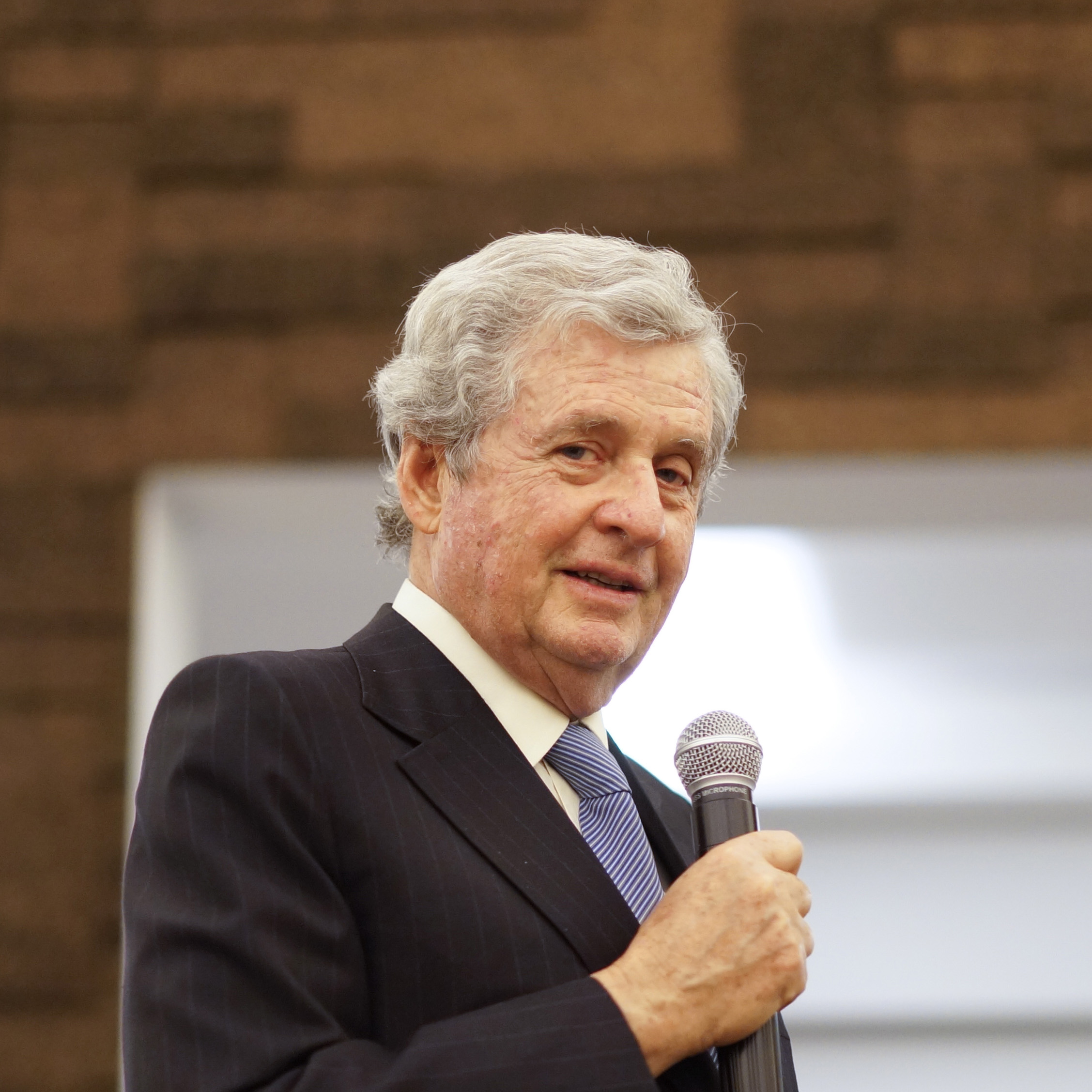
- Born: 4 June 1944; Lisbon
- Died: 27 October 2016 (aged 72); Lisbon
- Awards: Grand Cross of the Order of Prince Henry; Grand Cross of the Order of Liberty; Grand Cross of the Military Order of Saint James of the Sword

João Lobo Antunes (Portuguese: [ʒuˈɐ̃w ˈloβu ɐ̃ˈtunɨʃ]; 4 June 1944 – 27 October 2016) was a Portuguese neurosurgeon.

== Life and career ==
João Lobo Antunes was born in Lisbon as the second of six sons of João Alfredo de Figueiredo Lobo Antunes (born 1915), prominent Neurologist and Professor, close collaborator of Egas Moniz, Nobel prize of physiology, and wife Margarida da Beira Cardoso de Melo Machado, daughter of Joaquim José Machado, 70th, 82nd and 91st Governor of Mozambique and 110th Governor of Portuguese India, and wife Mariana Cardoso de Melo. His great-grandfather in male line was an illegitimate son of Bernardo António de Brito Antunes, 1st Viscount of Nazaré. He is the brother of novelist António Lobo Antunes and Manuel Lobo Antunes.

He has a degree in medicine by the University of Lisbon (1968). He then went to the United States, and worked in the Department of Neurosurgery of the NewYork-Presbyterian Hospital and taught at the Columbia University. In 1983 he returned to Portugal, to get a PhD from the University of Lisbon. A year later he was Professor in Neurosurgery at the Faculty of Medicine.

In 1990, he was elected vice-president of the World Federation of Neurosurgical Societies; in 1999 he was elected the President of the European Neurosurgery Society.

In 1996, he was elected President of the Scientific Council of the Faculty of Medicine. In the same year, he received the prestigious Pessoa Award.

He is the author of more than 150 scientific articles and wrote 4 books: "A way to be" (Um Modo de Ser), "In a happy city" (Numa cidade feliz), "NY Memories and other essays" (Memória de Nova Iorque e outros ensaios) and "About the hand and other essays" (Sobre a mão e outros ensaios).

His research focused in the study of the hypothalamus and the hypophysis. In 1982/83 he was the first surgeon to implant an electronic device in the eye of a blind man.

He was Professor of Neurosurgery in the Faculty of Medicine of Lisbon, Director of the Department of Neurosurgery of the Saint Mary Hospital (Hospital de Santa Maria) in Lisbon and was the President of the Portuguese Academy of Medicine.

He died on 27 October 2016, in Lisbon, from melanoma, at the age of 72.
