= November 1836 Portuguese legislative election =

| ← July 1836 | 20 November 1836 | 1838 → |

All 130 seats in the Chamber of Deputies 66 seats needed for a majority
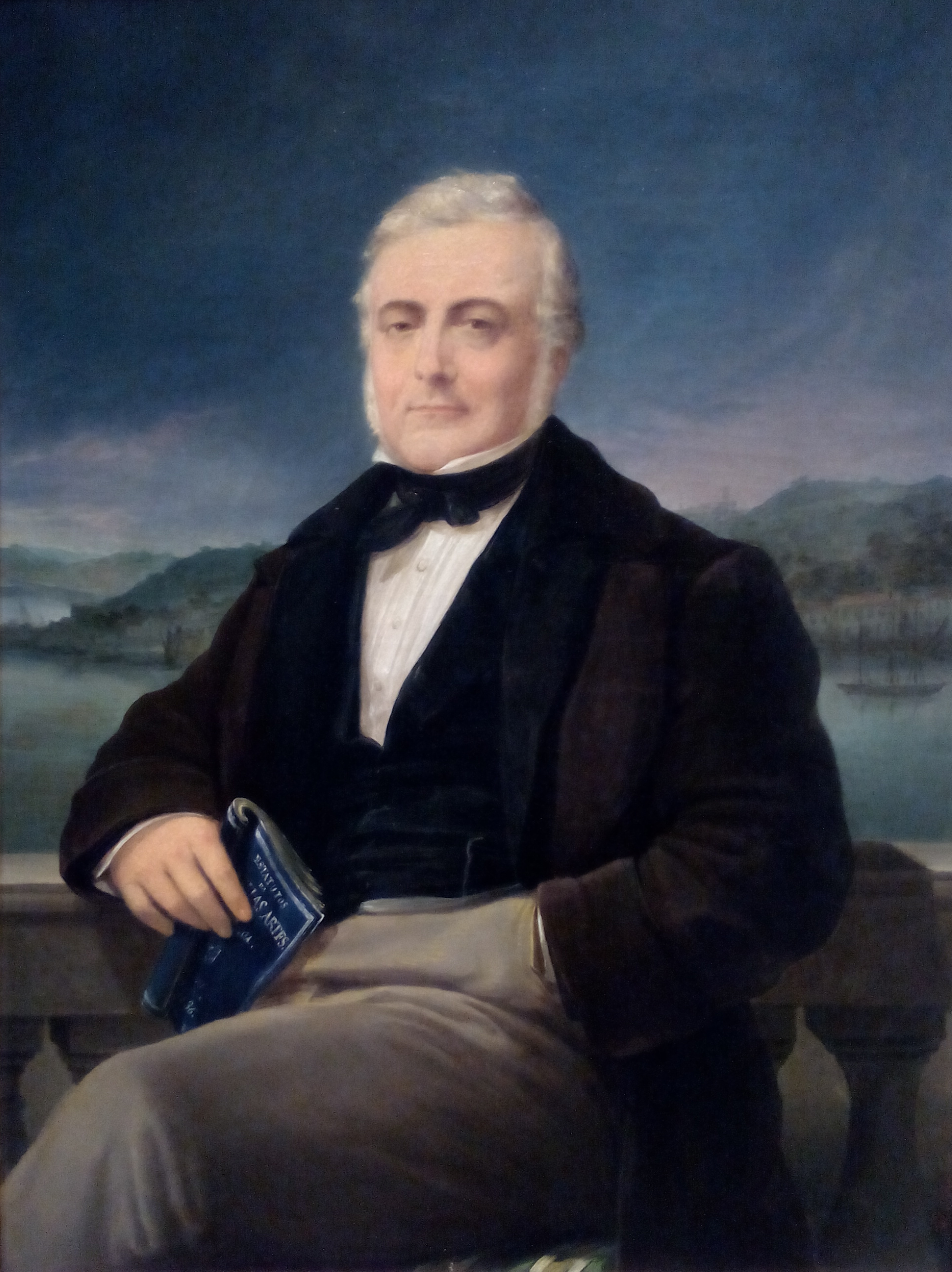

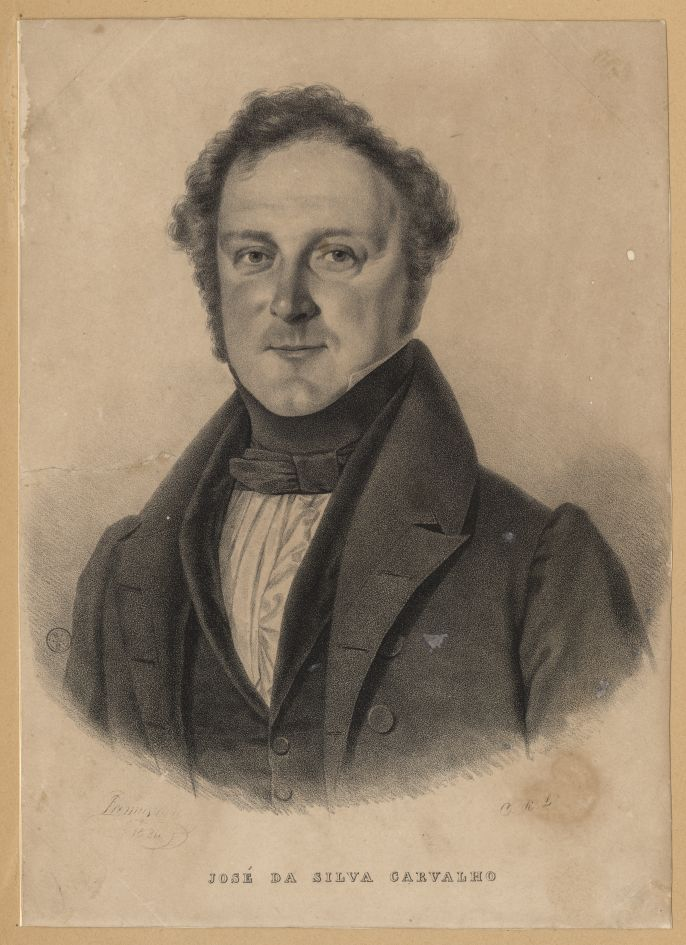
| | First party | Second party |
|---|---|---|
| Leader | Passos Manuel | José da Silva Carvalho |
| Party | Septembrist | Cartista |
| Last election | 30 seats | 79 seats |
| Seats won | 79 | 2 |
| Seats after | ▲49 | ▼77 |
Prime Minister before election
1st Marquis of Sá da Bandeira
Septembrist
Elected Prime Minister
1st Marquis of Sá da Bandeira
Septembrist

Parliamentary elections were held in Portugal on 20 November 1836.

== Electoral system ==
Elections had been held in July 1836 under the Constitutional Charter of 1826 and the Electoral Law of 7 August 1826. However, following the September Revolution, the 1822 constitution was restored. The constitution, together with decrees issued on 8 October and 10 November, created a 130-seat legislature with 122 members elected from multi-member constituencies on the mainland and islands and eight members elected in overseas colonies (six in single-member constituencies and two in a two-seat constituency). However, restrictions on the electoral franchise meant that only around 4.5% of the population were eligible to vote.

== Results ==
The result was a victory for the moderate Setembristas, who won a majority of seats, with the previously ruling Cartistas winning only two seats.

| Party | Seats |
|---|---|
| Septembrist | 79 |
| Cartistas | 2 |
| Others | 49 |
| Total | 130 |
Source: ICSCP

Parliamentary seats
| Septemberist | 60.77% |
| Cartista | 1.54% |
| Others | 37.69% |

== Aftermath ==
The newly elected Cortes Gerais met on 2 January 1837.
