= July 1836 Portuguese legislative election =

← 1834	17 and 31 July 1836	November 1836 →

All 141 seats in the Chamber of Deputies 71 seats needed for a majority
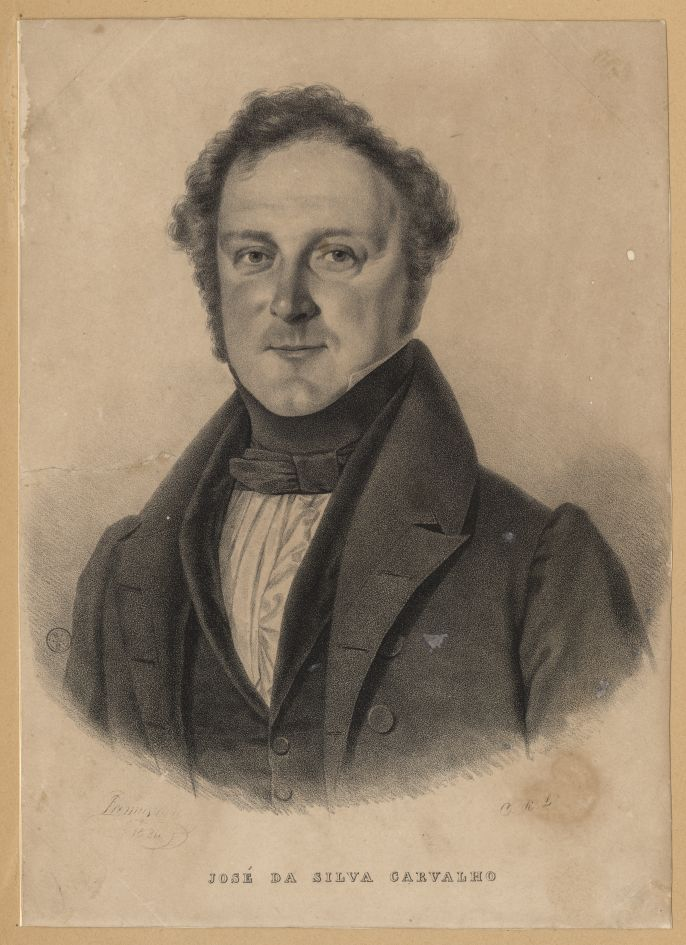

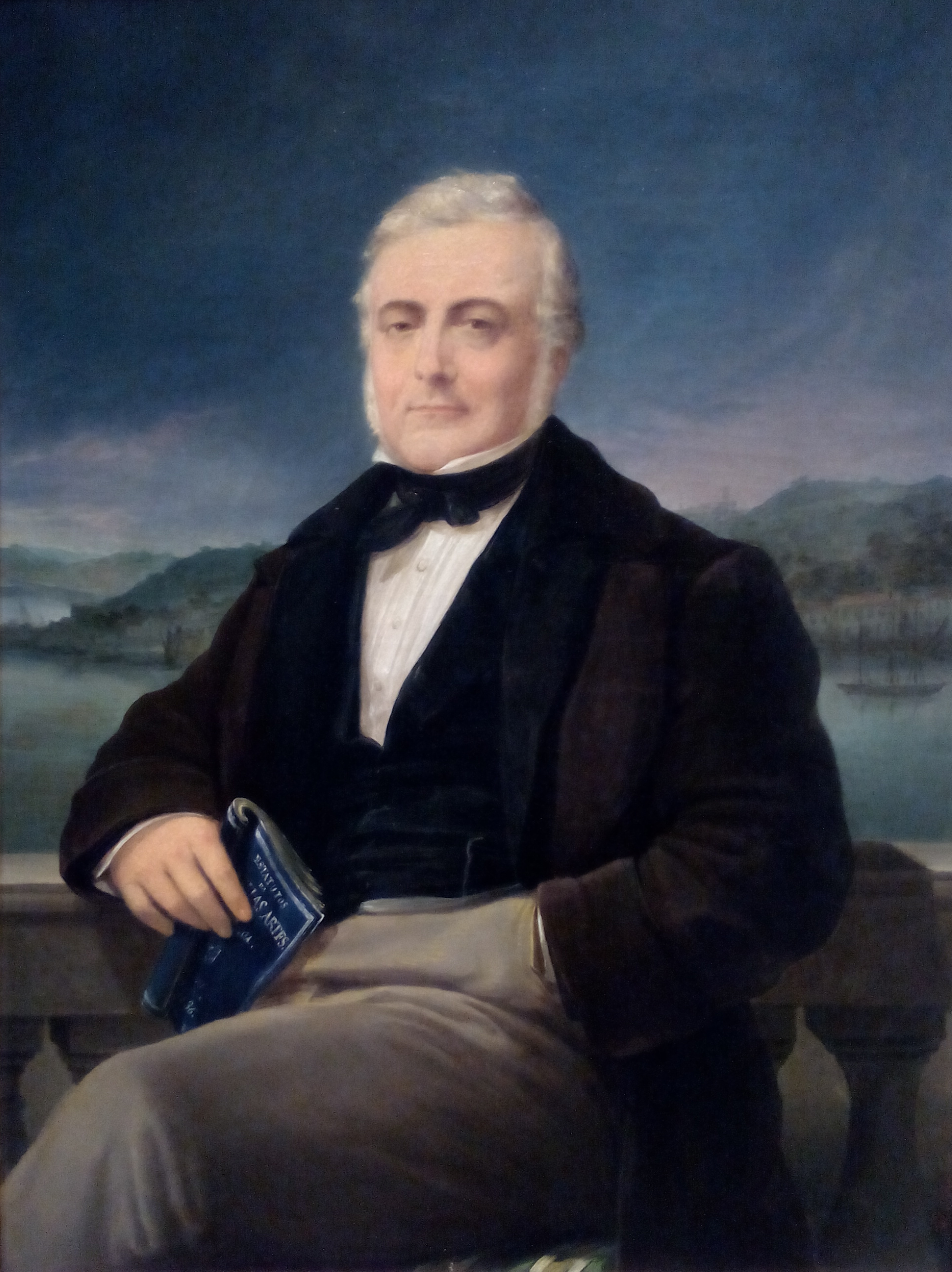
	First party	Second party
Leader	José da Silva Carvalho	Passos Manuel
Party	Cartista	Opposition
Last election	43 seats	32 seats
Seats won	79	30
Seat change	▲36	▼2
Prime Minister before election
1st Duke of Terceira
Chamorro
Elected Prime Minister
1st Duke of Terceira
Chamorro

Parliamentary elections were held in Portugal on 17 and 31 July 1836.

== Electoral system ==
The elections were held under the Constitutional Charter of 1826 and the Electoral Law of 7 August 1826. These provided for a bicameral parliament, the Cortes Gerais, with an elected Chamber of Deputies and a Chamber of Most Worthy Peers whose members were appointed by the monarch or were members of the nobility. The elections were indirect, with voters electing provincial assemblies, who in turn elected members of the Chamber of Deputies. Voting and candidature were restricted to those who met income requirements. The number of Deputies was reduced from 143 in 1834 to 141, with 132 elected from multi-member constituencies on the mainland and islands, and nine from single-member constituencies in overseas colonies.

== Results ==
The result was a victory for the ruling Cartistas, who won 79 seats. The opposition won 30 seats.

Party	Seats	+/–
Cartistas	79	+36
Opposition	30	–2
Others	32	–
Total	141	–2
Source: ISCSP

== Aftermath ==
The newly elected Cortes Gerais did not meet, and fresh elections were held in November following the September Revolution.
