= Arlete Vieira da Silva =

Portuguese far-left political figure

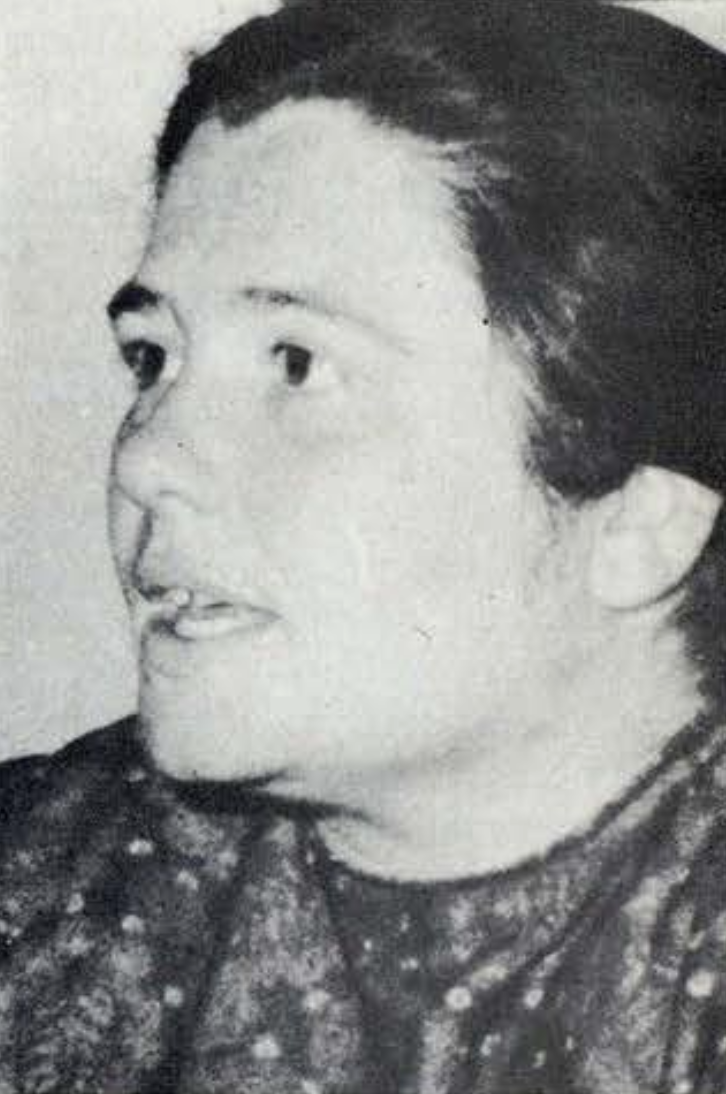

Personal details
- Born: Maria Arlete Vieira da Silva; 1940 Lisbon, Portugal
- Died: Unknown
- Party: Independent
- Other political affiliations: PCP (claimed, 1958–1975); LCI/PRT (presidential candidate)
- Occupation: Teacher, activist

Maria Arlete Vieira da Silva (born 1940, date of death unknown) was a Portuguese political figure who emerged briefly in 1976 as a proposed far-left presidential candidate. Backed by two Trotskyist organisations: the Internationalist Communist League (LCI) and the Workers' Revolutionary Party (PRT), she was presented as a former political prisoner and anti-fascist activist. Her candidacy collapsed shortly before formal registration when an internal investigation found no evidence to support key claims in her biography.

== Background ==
The biographical material distributed during Vieira da Silva's candidacy stated that she was born in Lisbon in 1940 and graduated at the age of 22 from the School of Philosophical and Historical Sciences. She was described as having been an activist in the University of Coimbra student strikes of 1961 and as having joined the Portuguese Communist Party (PCP) at the age of 18, beginning her political work on the 1958 presidential campaign of Humberto Delgado. Campaign materials also claimed she had participated in legislative election campaigns in 1965, 1969, and 1973, served on Support Committees for the Aveiro Democratic Congresses in 1969 and 1973, and contributed to the publications República and Seara Nova.

Her published biography further claimed extensive involvement in clandestine resistance to the Estado Novo dictatorship. According to these accounts, she had spent nearly three years working underground for the PCP, had been imprisoned five times over a total of almost four years, and had been subjected to torture by the secret police, during which her wrist was broken. The PCP was said to have sent her to the Soviet Union on three occasions, including an eight-month stay in Prague.

After her time underground, Vieira da Silva was said to have worked and organised in areas traditionally regarded as PCP strongholds, including Marinha Grande, Barreiro, the Lisbon industrial belt, and the Sintra line, and to have supported labour struggles at firms such as Sorefame and Cometna. Following the Carnation Revolution of 1974, she reportedly returned to the teaching profession, from which she had been dismissed in 1965.

Vieira da Silva was said to have left the PCP in 1975, criticising its political direction.

== 1976 presidential candidacy ==
=== Announcement ===
The candidacy took place amid the political instability following the Carnation Revolution. On 11 May 1976, the LCI and PRT, both sections of the Reunified Fourth International, announced Vieira da Silva as their joint candidate for the 1976 Portuguese presidential election. The announcement was reported in Jornal Novo, one of the largest Lisbon dailies. The two parties carried minimal electoral weight: in the 1976 legislative elections, they had received a combined total of just over 21,000 votes nationally, with the PRT finishing as the least-voted party with 5,171 votes. Under the electoral law, Vieira da Silva had until 28 May to gather a minimum of 7,500 signatures and submit them to the Supreme Court of Justice.

At a press conference, the presiding committee, which included Ferreira Fernandes and Cabral Fernandes of the LCI and Sá Leal of the PRT, presented Vieira da Silva as a woman, a worker, and a revolutionist. The speakers attacked the pact between the military and the established political parties, characterising it as the product of class collaborationism, and rejected the emerging consensus in favour of supporting General Eanes. They argued instead for a candidacy that could guarantee the political independence of the working class.

=== Platform ===
The campaign platform called for a government without capitalists or generals, based on the will of the working-class majority as expressed in the recent legislative elections. Vieira da Silva pledged that, if elected, she would invite the general secretary of the Socialist Party (PS), Mário Soares, or another PS leader chosen by the party to form such a government. The platform also called for the Assembly of the Republic to legislate freely, without the restrictions imposed by the pact and the special powers of the Council of the Revolution.

Specific policy demands included a minimum monthly wage of 6,000 escudos (approximately $200 US dollars at the time), a sliding scale of wages to counter inflation, and a democratic congress of all trade unions to draw up a plan of struggle. The platform also stressed the need for unity of the workers' movement against the bourgeoisie, whether in or out of uniform, and for a workers' united front including both the PS and the Portuguese Communist Party (PCP).

During the question period, the LCI and PRT speakers rejected the candidacy of Otelo Saraiva de Carvalho, arguing that workers could not rely on a general who had aligned himself with the military hierarchy and the Group of Nine since April 1974. They stated that they would withdraw their candidate only if the PS and PCP put forward a working-class candidate who was not linked to bourgeois parties, the state apparatus, or the military.

=== Campaign ===
Her supporters promoted Vieira da Silva as a representative of working-class independence and anti-fascist resistance, using the campaign slogan "Arlete – a woman, a worker, a revolutionary". Contemporary press coverage described her as a worker and revolutionary figure, and her campaign slogan emphasised opposition to military influence in politics. In press interviews, Vieira da Silva criticised the electoral process as failing to respond to the needs of the Portuguese people and framed her candidacy as part of a broader revolutionary struggle rather than a conventional electoral campaign. Although backed by the two Trotskyist parties, she indicated that she intended to stand as an independent candidate.

Local accounts indicate that the candidacy attracted some support in areas such as Estarreja, and has been described as a "sui generis" candidacy, though it ultimately failed to secure sufficient signatures nationwide.

=== Controversy and withdrawal ===
Shortly after the announcement, doubts were raised in the press about the accuracy of Vieira da Silva's biography. O Diário, a newspaper aligned with the PCP, was among the first to challenge her claims publicly, noting that there was no record of her passage through PIDE prisons and suggesting that any imprisonment had been for unrelated and less creditable reasons. An internal investigation by the LCI concluded that she "has neither the track record nor the minimum requirements" to represent the movement. In its communiqué, the LCI stated that Vieira da Silva's past did not offer the transparency demanded of a presidential candidate.

When the parties requested Vieira da Silva's criminal record, it showed a 1969 imprisonment that she attributed to an altercation with a Polícia Judiciária agent during that year's election campaign. Further inquiries with the courts, however, revealed that the actual case involved the non-payment for and misappropriation of household appliances. No political process against her was found in the archives of the Tribunal da Boa Hora, and her claimed three-year imprisonment at the Fort of Caxias could not be confirmed in any records.

The LCI communicated its withdrawal of support the day before the candidacy deadline, urging the PRT to do the same. Both parties formally withdrew, and the candidacy was never submitted. The Expresso reported the withdrawal in the week the candidacy window closed. Following the collapse, Vieira da Silva disappeared from public political life. The election proceeded with four candidates: Ramalho Eanes, Otelo Saraiva de Carvalho, Pinheiro de Azevedo, and Octávio Pato. Ramalho Eanes won the presidency in the first round.

Contemporary commentary framed the affair as symptomatic of wider failings within the Portuguese left. Writing in Vida Mundial, the columnist A.M. questioned why the PRT had not investigated Vieira da Silva's past before proposing her candidacy, given that it had already involved her in earlier campaigns. The article also asked how long the PCP had been aware that her claims of imprisonment at Caxias were false, and why the party had remained silent. A.M. described Vieira da Silva as the symbol of a fabricated anti-fascism, drawing a comparison with the many individuals who claimed resistance credentials only after the revolution of 25 April 1974.

The episode has been cited as illustrative of the volatility and fragmentation of the Portuguese far left during the post-revolutionary period.

=== Aftermath ===
The LCI and PRT initially merged under a hyphenated name before reorganising as the Partido Socialista Revolucionário (PSR). A leading figure in the successor party was Francisco Louçã, a young LCI activist who later became the founder and first leader of the Left Bloc.
