= Hot Summer of 1975 =

Period of instability in Portuguese history

- Part of the Ongoing Revolutionary Process
Date	June – August 1975
Location	Portugal, especially in the North
Result	Prime Minister Vasco Gonçalves is dismissed Coup of 25 November 1975: Ending of the Ongoing Revolutionary Process; Rightist forces are strengthened

Belligerents
(Portugal) Revolutionary Council; Supported by: PCP	ELP; MDLP; Movimento Maria da Fonte; CODECO; FLAMA; FLA; MAPA	(Portugal) Group of Nine
	Rightist political parties: CDS; PPD	PS

Commanders and leaders
(Portugal) Francisco da Costa Gomes (Portugal) Vasco Gonçalves (Portugal) Otelo Saraiva de Carvalho; Álvaro Cunhal	António de Spínola; Guilherme Almor de Alpoim Calvão; Ramiro Moreira (Portugal) António Pires Veloso (Portugal) Jaime Neves; Paradela de Abreu; Eduardo Melo Peixoto	(Portugal) Ernesto Melo Antunes (Portugal) Vasco Lourenço (Portugal) Jaime Neves (Portugal) António Ramalho Eanes
		Mário Soares

Casualties and losses
- Around 10 civilians die as a result of clashes, terrorist attacks and massacres

The Hot Summer of 1975 (Portuguese: Verão Quente de 1975) was a tumultuous period in Portuguese history characterised by political, social and military instability. At the centre of the conflict was the rift between rightist and leftist groups, as well as the rift among leftist groups themselves.

== Background ==
On 25 April 1974, a group of young military officers, belonging to an underground organization, the Armed Forces Movement (Movimento das Forças Armadas – MFA), overthrew the Estado Novo dictatorship under the president, Marcelo Caetano, in what has become known as the Carnation Revolution. General António de Spínola, whose 1973 book, Portugal and the Future, is seen as a catalyst for the Revolution, became the titular head of the new government. Within hours, the Portuguese poured into the streets to both celebrate the downfall of the regime and demand further change. However, after half a century under an authoritarian regime, few of the revolutionaries had any idea how to establish democratic institutions. Workers began taking over shops from owners, peasants seized private land, low-level employees took over hospitals and other organizations, and government offices were occupied by workers.

These actions soon began to be manipulated by organized political elements who had been working underground under the Estado Novo, principally the Communist Party of Portugal (PCP), under the leadership of Álvaro Cunhal, and other groups even farther to the left. Spínola appointed a broad-based government but under this formal structure several other groups wielded some power, including the National Salvation Junta (Junta de Salvação Nacional), made up of high-ranking, politically moderate military officers, and a committee of politically radical junior officers from the MFA, who had instituted the Revolution.

Spínola formed a second provisional government in mid-July 1974 with Vasco Gonçalves as prime minister. He had chosen Gonçalves because he was a moderate, but Gonçalves was to move increasingly to the left. Spínola was further weakened when he was forced to agree to the independence of Portugal's African colonies, rather than seek a federal solution he had outlined in his 1973 book. He attempted to seize full power in late September 1974 but was blocked by COPCON, the military command, and resigned from office. From this time Portugal moved steadily to the left, with the PCP and MFA being the dominant forces. Meanwhile, other European countries and the US were becoming increasingly concerned and began to take actions to promote social democracy in the country.

Spínola supported an attempted right-wing coup in early March 1975 but this failed and he fled the country to Brazil. This failure strengthened the left. A new government began to nationalize banks and large businesses. In the summer of 1975 this led to growing tensions, which are commonly known in Portugal as the Verão Quente, or Hot Summer.

== The Hot Summer, 1975 ==
During the summer there were many expropriations and land occupations promoted by the agrarian reform established by the left, and encouraged by Gonçalves, in the areas of the country where there were larger properties, such as in the Alentejo. In the north, there were more than 550 violent acts, such as the assault on left-wing party headquarters and bomb attacks by groups such as the Maria da Fonte Movement, which took its name from an 1846 uprising, Spínola's Democratic Movement for the Liberation of Portugal (MDLP), and right-wing supporters of the former Estado Novo regime. In addition, major disturbances were organized by the CAP (Confederation of Portuguese Farmers). Such activities were occurring at the same time as Portuguese living in its former colonies were returning home. This influx of refugees from Angola, and other former colonies led to a housing and employment crisis.

On 9 July 1975 the Socialist Party (PS) left the government in protest against the occupation of the offices of the newspaper República, which was sympathetic to the party, and the government's failure to resolve the situation. The political climate led to the resignation of the fourth provisional government on 8 August. At this time, the "Group of Nine" emerged. This was a moderate faction of the MFA, which drafted the Document of Nine. Otelo, who had refused to join the fifth provisional government, responded to the Document of Nine with the Document of Revolutionary Self-Criticism, also known as the COPCON Document, in which he advocated grassroots popular power, thereby offering support from the military to the far-left. This led to Portugal being effectively controlled by three blocs, one led by Otelo, another by the PCP, and a third, moderate bloc, by the Group of Nine, which was closely allied to the PS.

On 27 August, 24 journalists from the right-leaning Diário de Notícias (DN) were sacked after they submitted a petition to the management supporting a review of the editorial line, which they denounced as revisionist. The fifth provisional government only lasted for five weeks, with the enforced resignation of Gonçalves after pressure on President Francisco da Costa Gomes by the moderates. Meanwhile, certain far-left military factions were arming friendly civilian groups, including those responsible for terrorist attacks, such as the Partido Revolucionário do Proletariado - Brigadas Revolucionárias.

On 27 September, protesters attacked Spanish diplomatic missions in Lisbon, Porto, and Évora, to protest against the execution of five far-left Basque nationalists by the Franco regime, carried out that same day. Francoist Spain had given refuge to Portugal's 11 March 1975 coup plotters, and since then some members of its government had hinted at the possibility of a military interventionist plan in Portugal, seeking support from the US and NATO.

== Beginnings of democracy ==
The situation began to stabilise as a result of events in November 1975. A two-day siege of the prime minister's office by dissatisfied construction workers led to the government suspending all activities in protest at the lack of support from the military. Partly in response to this a 'moderate' was appointed to head the military in Lisbon, leading to opposition from the left-wing factions in the military. On 25 November left-wing paratroopers tried to seize military installations in Lisbon and elsewhere but were quickly defeated by forces loyal to the government. After this, the left-wing forces were purged. Elections were held in April 1976, with the PS leader, Mario Soares, becoming the prime minister after forming a coalition with parties to the right of his. The communists received 12.5% of the vote.

== See also ==
- Carnation Revolution
- Portuguese transition to democracy
- Portuguese Third Republic
- Years of Lead (Italy)
