= 1976 Portuguese presidential election =

- 27 June 1976
- Turnout: 75.47%
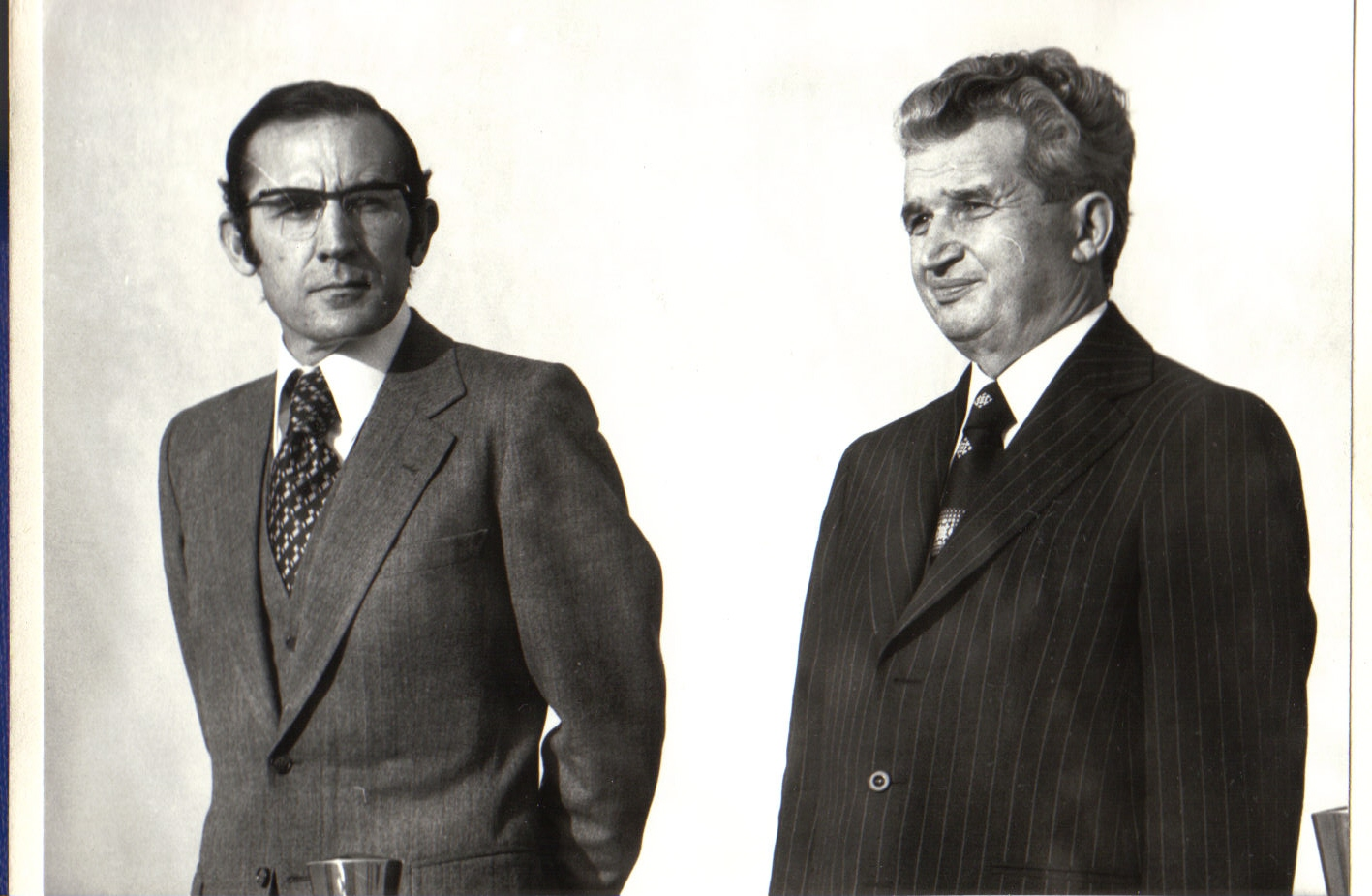

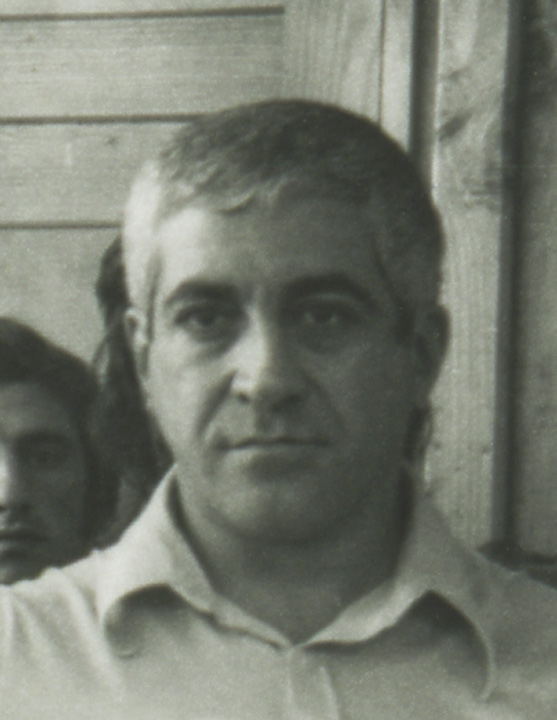

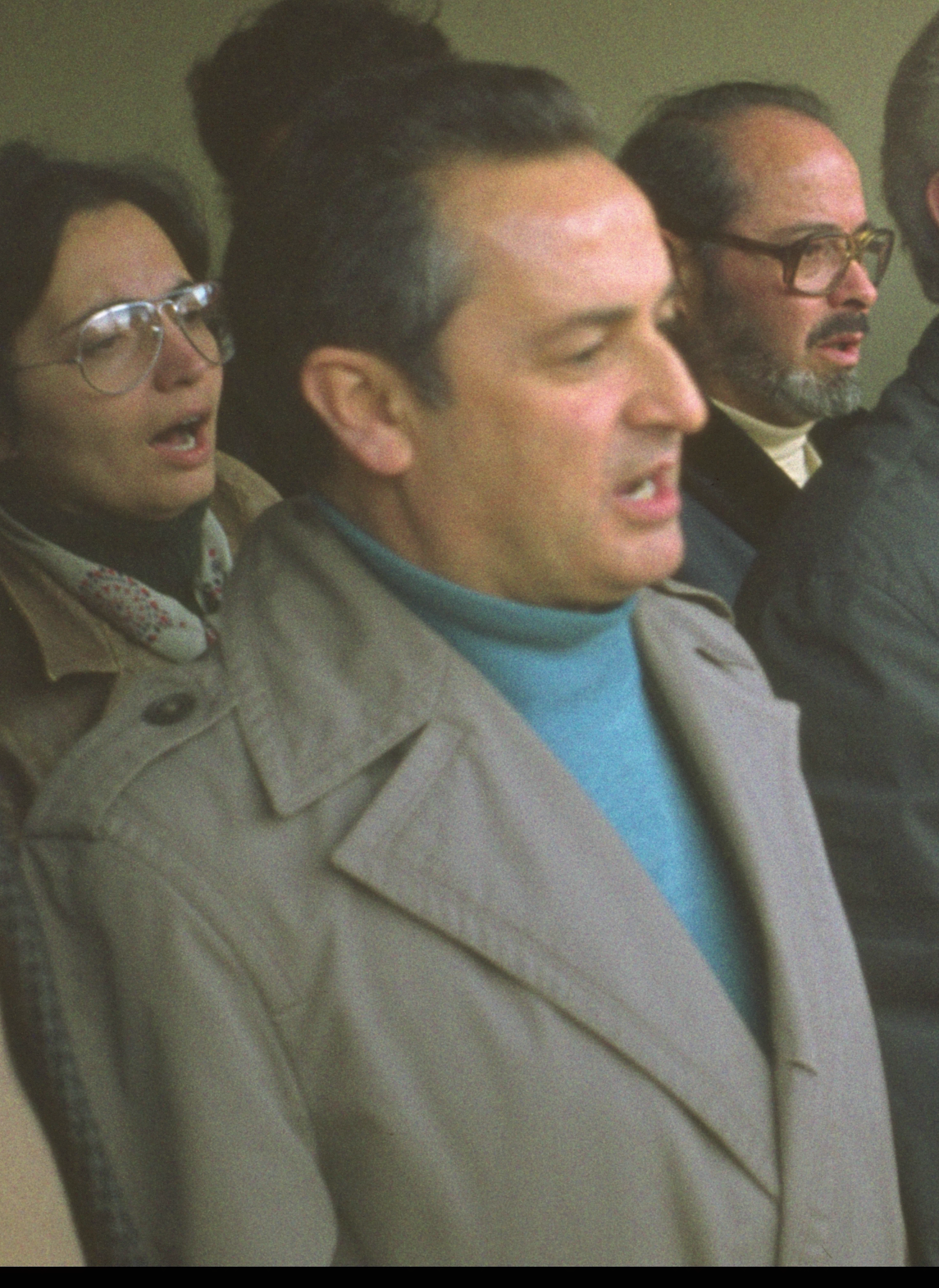
| Candidate | António Ramalho Eanes | Otelo Saraiva de Carvalho |
| Party | Independent Supported by: PS; PPD; CDS; MRPP | Independent Supported by: UDP; MES; FSP; PRP-BR |
| Popular vote | 2,967,137 | 792,760 |
| Percentage | 61.59% | 16.46% |
| Candidate | José Pinheiro de Azevedo | Octávio Pato |
| Party | Independent | PCP |
| Popular vote | 692,147 | 365,586 |
| Percentage | 14.37% | 7.59% |

Eanes
30-40%
40-50%
50-60%
60-70%
70-80%
80-90%
>90%
Carvalho
30-40%
40-50%
50-60%
60-70%
Pato
30-40%
40-50%
President before election
Francisco da Costa Gomes
Independent
Elected President
António Ramalho Eanes
Independent

A presidential election was held in Portugal on 27 June 1976.

With a broad base of support that comprised the center-left and the center-right, Ramalho Eanes won the election on the first round with more than 61% of the votes and became the first elected President of Portugal after the Carnation Revolution.

The Portuguese Communist Party presented its own candidate, Octávio Pato, a well known anti-fascist, but performed poorly, receiving just under 8% of the votes. Otelo Saraiva de Carvalho, a key figure during the Carnation Revolution in 1974, was also a candidate, polling second with 16%, while former prime minister José Pinheiro de Azevedo was narrowly behind at third place with 14% of the votes. Voter turnout stood at above 75% of registered voters. Eanes was sworn in as President on 14 July 1976.

== Background ==
Following the approval of a new constitution in early April 1976, the process of electing new institutions, a new assembly and a president, began with legislative elections on 25 April, and with the scheduling of presidential elections for 27 June, confirmed by then-President Francisco da Costa Gomes in May of the same year. The outgoing president, Costa Gomes, refused the idea of running for a full term, in order to facilitate the transition to democracy. Early on, the role of general António Ramalho Eanes in the 25 November 1975 coup, made him the consensus candidate among the main democratic forces.

== Electoral system ==
Any Portuguese citizen over 35 years old has the opportunity to run for president. In order to do so it was necessary to gather between 7500 and 15000 signatures and submit them to the Supreme Court of Justice by 28 May 1976.

According to the Portuguese Constitution, to be elected, a candidate needs a majority of votes. If no candidate gets this majority there will take place a second round between the two most voted candidates.

== Candidates ==
=== Official candidates ===
- António Ramalho Eanes – Military officer, Main leader against the Coup of 25 November 1975, former chairman of RTP, supported by the Socialist Party, Democratic People's Party, Democratic and Social Centre and the Portuguese Workers' Communist Party;
- José Pinheiro de Azevedo – Navy officer, Prime Minister between 1975 and 1976, Independent candidate;
- Octávio Pato – supported by the Portuguese Communist Party;
- Otelo Saraiva de Carvalho – Military officer, Independent candidate supported by the Popular Democratic Union, Movement of Socialist Left, People's Socialist Front and the Revolutionary Party of the Proletariat – Revolutionary Brigades.

=== Unsuccessful candidacies ===
There was also one candidate rejected by the Portuguese Constitutional Court for not complying with the legal requirements:

- Venceslau Pompílio da Cruz.

=== Withrawn candidates ===
- Arlete Vieira da Silva – supported by the Internationalist Communist League and the Workers' Revolutionary Party.

== Campaign period ==
=== Issues ===
The campaign was held under a rather tense and unstable environment. Otelo Saraiva's campaign was met with stones and gunfire in Lamego, while Eanes campaign was also received with gunshots in Évora, resulting in one death and six injured. Pinheiro de Azevedo's campaign, on the other hand, endured a setback in the last days of the campaign trail with the candidate suffering a heart attack and being hospitalized.

=== Party slogans ===
| Candidate | Original slogan | English translation | Refs |
|---|---|---|---|
| António Ramalho Eanes | « Muitos prometem... Eanes cumpre » « Candidato de Portugal » | "Many promise ... Eanes delivers" "Portugal's Candidate" | |
| Otelo Saraiva de Carvalho | « O 25 de Abril à Presidência » | "April 25 to the Presidency" | |
| José Pinheiro de Azevedo | « Vota Pinheiro de Azevedo » | "Vote Pinheiro de Azevedo" | |
| Octávio Pato | « Pela democracia e o socialismo » | "For democracy and socialism" | |

=== Candidates' debates ===
1976 Portuguese presidential election debates
| Date | Organisers | Moderator(s) | P Present A Absent invitee N Non-invitee | | | | |
| Date | Organisers | Moderator(s) | Eanes | Otelo | Azevedo | Pato | Refs |
|---|---|---|---|---|---|---|---|
| 9 Jun 1976 | RTP1 | Joaquim Letria | P | P | P | P | |

== Opinion polls ==
| Polling firm | Date released | Sample size | Ramalho Eanes | Otelo | Pinheiro Azevedo | Octávio Pato | Oth | Lead |
| Polling firm | Date released | Sample size | Ind. | Ind. | Ind. | PCP | Oth | Lead |
|---|---|---|---|---|---|---|---|---|
| Election results | 26 Jun 1976 | —N/a | 61.6 | 16.5 | 14.4 | 7.6 | — | 45.1 |
| Expresso (Note: Results presented here exclude undecideds (27%), did not respond (10%) and vote none (1%). With their inclusion results are: António Ramalho Eanes: 33%; Pinheiro de Azevedo: 14%; Otelo Saraiva de Carvalho: 11%; Octávio Pato: 3%; Venceslau Pompílio da Cruz: 1%.) | 9 Jun 1976 | —N/a | 53.2 | 17.7 | 22.6 | 4.8 | 1.7 | 30.6 |

== Results ==
=== National summary ===
| Candidate | Party | Votes | % |
|---|---|---|---|
| António Ramalho Eanes | Independent (Note: Supported by the Socialist Party, the Democratic People's Party, the Democratic Social Center and the Portuguese Workers' Communist Party.) | 2,967,137 | 61.59 |
| Otelo Saraiva de Carvalho | Independent (Note: Supported by the Popular Democratic Union, the Movement of Socialist Left, the People's Socialist Front and the Revolutionary Party of the Proletariat – Revolutionary Brigades.) | 792,760 | 16.46 |
| José Pinheiro de Azevedo | Independent | 692,147 | 14.37 |
| Octávio Pato | Portuguese Communist Party | 365,586 | 7.59 |
| Total | | 4,817,630 | 100.00 |
| Valid votes | | 4,817,630 | 98.70 |
| Invalid votes | | 20,253 | 0.41 |
| Blank votes | | 43,242 | 0.89 |
| Total votes | | 4,881,125 | 100.00 |
| Registered voters/turnout | | 6,467,480 | 75.47 |
Source: Comissão Nacional de Eleições

=== Results by district ===
| District | Eanes | | Otelo | | Azevedo | | Pato | | Turnout |
| District | Votes | % | Votes | % | Votes | % | Votes | % | Turnout |
|---|---|---|---|---|---|---|---|---|---|
| Aveiro | 217,589 | 74.47% | 20,634 | 6.97% | 46,346 | 15.86% | 7,866 | 2.69% | 77.38% |
| Azores | 30,646 | 86.06% | 9,510 | 9.01% | 17,076 | 16.18% | 2,562 | 2.43% | 71.13% |
| Beja | 36,219 | 34.59% | 34,339 | 32.80% | 7,296 | 6.97% | 26,844 | 25.64% | 74.37% |
| Braga | 218,459 | 70.20% | 25,089 | 8.06% | 59,093 | 18.99% | 8,550 | 2.75% | 82.34% |
| Bragança | 67,593 | 82.59% | 2,725 | 3.33% | 9,357 | 11.43% | 2,167 | 2.65% | 68.71% |
| Castelo Branco | 98,828 | 76.25% | 14,393 | 11.33% | 10,927 | 8.61% | 4,833 | 3.81% | 73.66% |
| Coimbra | 147,906 | 71.93% | 19,801 | 9.63% | 29,038 | 14.12% | 8,887 | 4.32% | 67.51% |
| Évora | 39,847 | 36.03% | 38,509 | 34.82% | 10,500 | 9.50% | 21,726 | 19.65% | 81.28% |
| Faro | 87,590 | 52.88% | 41,018 | 24.76% | 24,331 | 14.69% | 12,698 | 7.67% | 70.81% |
| Guarda | 88,451 | 82.87% | 4,528 | 4.24% | 11,194 | 10.49% | 2,558 | 2.40% | 72.64% |
| Leiria | 156,404 | 76.63% | 18,682 | 9.15% | 20,109 | 9.85% | 8,915 | 4.37% | 73.26% |
| Lisbon | 582,103 | 53.55% | 259,915 | 23.91% | 132,600 | 12.20% | 112,395 | 10.34% | 75.93% |
| Madeira | 76,417 | 72.39% | 9,510 | 9.01% | 17,076 | 16.18% | 2,562 | 2.43% | 74.81% |
| Portalegre | 47,665 | 56.12% | 14,122 | 16.63% | 10,893 | 12.82% | 12,258 | 14.43% | 78.24% |
| Porto | 450,236 | 60.43% | 86,356 | 11.59% | 169,940 | 22.81% | 38,548 | 5.17% | 80.76% |
| Santarém | 141,397 | 58.68% | 48,370 | 20.07% | 31,564 | 13.10% | 19,634 | 8.15% | 73.53% |
| Setúbal | 96,739 | 29.87% | 135,495 | 41.83% | 31,166 | 9.62% | 60,519 | 18.68% | 77.78% |
| Viana do Castelo | 87,136 | 74.64% | 8,075 | 6.92% | 17,174 | 14.71% | 4,362 | 3.74% | 72.36% |
| Vila Real | 91,261 | 81.59% | 4,552 | 4.07% | 12,604 | 11.27% | 3,433 | 3.07% | 67.59% |
| Viseu | 155,520 | 81.19% | 7,447 | 3.90% | 25,071 | 13.09% | 3,490 | 1.82% | 69.81% |
Source: SGMAI Presidential Election Results

=== Maps ===
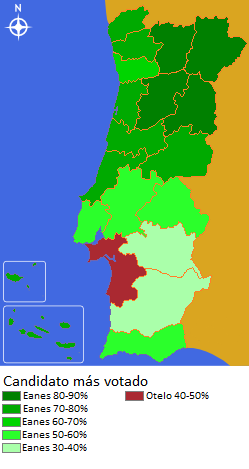
Strongest candidate by electoral district.

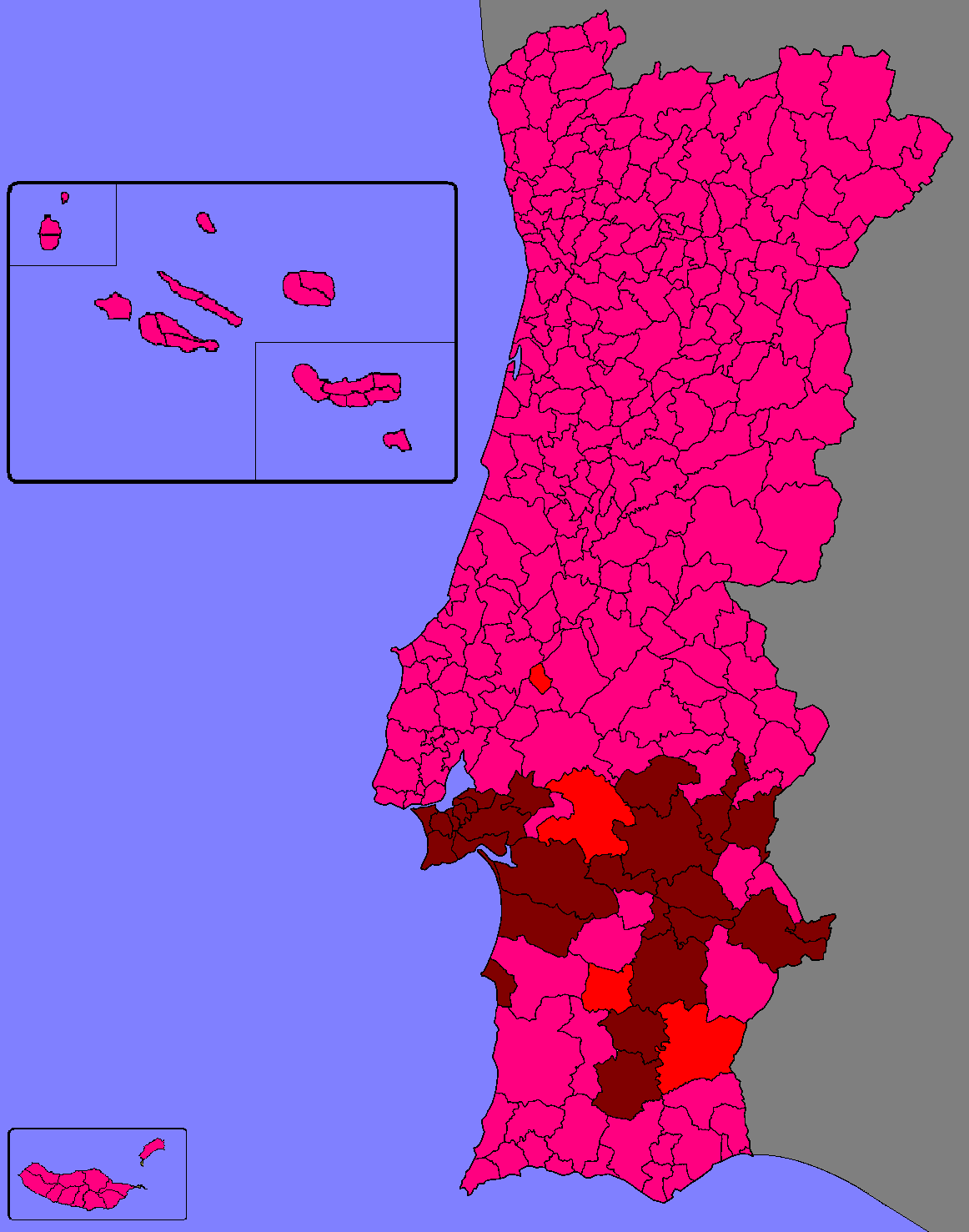
Strongest candidate by municipality: Eanes - magenta; Otelo - dark red; Octávio Pato - red.
