= Portuguese transition to democracy =

Period in Portuguese history (1974-76) following the Carnation Revolution

Portugal's redemocratization process started with the Carnation Revolution of 1974. It ended with the enactment of the Constitution of Portugal in 1976.

== Background ==
The 28 May 1926 coup d'état replaced the First Portuguese Republic with a military dictatorship that promised order, authority, and discipline. The military regime abolished political parties, took steps against the small but vocal Marxist groups, and did away with republican institutions. In 1928, it invited University of Coimbra professor António de Oliveira Salazar to serve as minister of finance. In 1932 he became Prime Minister. That year marked the beginning of his regime, the New State (Estado Novo).

Under Salazar (1932–68), Portugal became, at least formally, a corporative state. The new Constitution of 1933 embodied the corporatist theory, under which government was to be formed of economic entities organized according to their function, rather than by individual representation. Employers were to form one group, labor another, and they and other groups were to deal with one another through their representative organizations.

In reality, however, Salazar headed an autocratic dictatorship with the help of an efficient secret police – the PIDE. Strict censorship was introduced, the politically suspect were monitored, and the regime's opponents were jailed, sent into exile, and occasionally killed.

Portugal drifted and floundered under this repressive regime for several decades. Economic conditions improved slightly in the 1950s, when Salazar instituted the first of two five-year economic plans. These plans stimulated some growth, and living standards began to rise.

=== 1960s and the Colonial War ===
The 1960s, however, were crisis years for Portugal. Guerrilla movements emerged in the Portuguese African overseas territories of Angola, Mozambique and Guinea that aimed at liberating those territories from "the last colonial empire". Fighting three guerrilla movements for more than a decade proved to be enormously draining for a small, poor country in terms of labour and financial resources.

In the early 1960s the rise of new technocrats with a background in economics and technical-industrial expertise led to a new period of economic fostering, with Portugal as an attractive country for international investment. Industrial development and economic growth would continue throughout the 1960s. During Salazar's tenure, Portugal participated in the founding of the European Free Trade Association (EFTA) in 1960 and the Organisation for Economic Co-operation and Development (OECD) in 1961. In the early 1960s, Portugal also added its membership in the General Agreement on Tariffs and Trade (GATT), the International Monetary Fund (IMF), and the World Bank. This marked the initiation of Salazar's more outward-looking economic policy. Portuguese foreign trade increased by 52 per cent in exports and 40 per cent in imports. The economic growth and levels of capital formation from 1960 to 1973 were characterized by an unparalleled robust annual growth rates of GDP (6.9 per cent), industrial production (9 per cent), private consumption (6.5 per cent) and gross fixed capital formation (7.8 per cent).

In 1960, at the initiation of Salazar's more outward-looking economic policy, Portugal's per capita GDP was only 38 percent of the European Community (EC-12) average; by the end of the Salazar period, in 1968, it had risen to 48 percent; and in 1973, under the leadership of Marcelo Caetano, Portugal's per capita GDP had reached 56.4 percent of the EC-12 average. On a long term analysis, after a long period of economic divergence before 1914, and a period of chaos during the First Republic, the Portuguese economy recovered slightly until 1950, entering thereafter on a path of strong economic convergence with the wealthiest economies of Western Europe, until the Carnation Revolution in April 1974. Portuguese economic growth in the period 1960 to 1973 under the Estado Novo regime (and even with the effects of an expensive war effort in African territories against independence guerrilla groups), created an opportunity for real integration with the developed economies of Western Europe. Through emigration, trade, tourism and foreign investment, individuals and firms changed their patterns of production and consumption, bringing about a structural transformation. Simultaneously, the increasing complexity of a growing economy raised new technical and organizational challenges, stimulating the formation of modern professional and management teams.

=== Salazar incapacitated ===
When Salazar was incapacitated in an accident in 1968, the Council of State, a high-level advisory body created by the Constitution of 1933, chose Marcello Caetano to succeed him. Caetano (1968–74), though a Salazar protégé, tried to modernize and liberalize the old Salazar system. He was opposed, however, by a group widely referred to as "the bunker," the old Salazarists. These included the country's president, Admiral Américo Tomás, the senior officers of the armed forces, and the heads of some of the country's largest financial groups. The bunker was powerful enough that any fundamental change would certainly have led to Caetano's immediate overthrow.

As Caetano promised reform but fell into indecision, the sense began to grow among all groups—the armed forces, the opposition and liberals within the regime—that only a revolution could produce the changes that they felt Portugal sorely needed. Contributing to this feeling were a number of growing tensions on the political and social scene.

=== Economic pressure ===
The continuing economic drain caused by the military campaigns in Africa was exacerbated by the first great oil "shock" of 1973. Politically, the desire for democracy, or at least a greater opening up of the political system, was increasing. Social tensions mounted, as well, because of the slow pace of change and the absence of opportunities for advancement.

The decisive ingredient in these tensions was dissension within the military itself, long a bulwark of the regime. Younger military academy graduates resented a program introduced by Caetano whereby militia officers who completed a brief training program and had served in the overseas territories' defensive campaigns, could be commissioned at the same rank as military academy graduates. Caetano's government had begun the program (which included several other reforms) in order to increase the number of officials employed against the African insurgencies, and at the same time cut down military costs to alleviate an already overburdened government budget.

== Spínola and revolution ==
A key catalytic event in the process toward revolution was the publication, in 1973, of General António de Spínola's book, Portugal and the Future, which criticized the conduct of the war and offered a far-ranging program for Portugal's recovery. The general's work sent shock waves through the political establishment in Lisbon. As the first major and public challenge to the regime by a high-ranking figure from within the system, Spínola's experience in the African campaigns gave his opinions added weight. The book was widely seen as the opening salvo in Spínola's ambitious campaign to become president.

=== 1974 uprising ===
On 25 April 1974, a group of younger officers belonging to an underground organization, the Armed Forces Movement (Movimento das Forças Armadas – MFA), overthrew the Caetano regime, and Spínola emerged as at least the titular head of the new government. The uprising succeeded in hours with virtually no bloodshed. Caetano and other high-ranking officials of the old regime were arrested and exiled, many to Brazil. The military seized control of all important installations.

Spínola regarded the military's action as a simple military uprising aimed at reorganizing the political structure with himself as the head, a "renovação" (renovation), in his words. Within days, however, it became clear that the uprising had released long pent-up frustrations when thousands, and then tens of thousands, of Portuguese poured into the streets celebrating the downfall of the regime and demanding further change. The coercive apparatus of the dictatorship – secret police, Republican Guard, official party, censorship – was overwhelmed and abolished. Workers began taking over shops from owners, peasants seized private lands, low-level employees took over hospitals from doctors and administrators, and government offices were occupied by workers who sacked the old management and demanded a thorough housecleaning.

Very early on, the demonstrations began to be manipulated by organized political elements, principally the communists and other groups farther to the left. Radical labor and peasant leaders emerged from the underground where they had been operating for many years. Mário Soares, the leader of the Socialist Party of Portugal (Partido Socialista – PS) and Álvaro Cunhal, head of the Portuguese Communist Party (Partido Comunista Português – PCP) returned from exile to Portugal within days of the revolt and received heroes' welcomes.

Who actually ruled Portugal during this revolutionary period was not always clear, and various bodies vied for dominance. Spínola became the first interim president of the new regime in May 1974, and he chose the first of six provisional governments that were to govern the country until two years later when the first constitutional government was formed. Headed by a prime minister, the moderate civilian Adelino da Palma Carlos, the government consisted of the moderate Democratic People's Party (Partido Popular Democrático – PPD), the PS, the PCP, five independents, and one military officer.

Beneath this formal structure, several other groups wielded considerable power. In the first weeks of the revolution, a key group was the National Salvation Junta (Junta de Salvação Nacional), composed entirely of high-ranking, politically moderate military officers. Working alongside it was a seven-member coordinating committee made up of politically radical junior officers who had managed the uprising. By the end of May 1974, these two bodies worked together with other members in the Council of State, the nation's highest governing body.

Gradually, however, the MFA emerged as the most powerful single group in Portugal as it overruled Spínola in several major decisions. Members of the MFA formed the Continental Operations Command (Comando Operacional do Continente – COPCON) composed of 5,000 elite troops with Major (later Brigadier General) Otelo Saraiva de Carvalho as its commander. Known universally by his unusual first name Otelo, Carvalho had directed the 25 April uprising. Because the regular police withdrew from the public sector during the time of revolutionary turmoil and the military was somewhat divided, COPCON became the most important force for order in the country and was firmly under the control of radical left-wing officers.

Spínola formed a second provisional government in mid-July with army Colonel (later General) Vasco Gonçalves as prime minister and eight military officers along with members of the PS, PCP, and PPD. Spínola chose Gonçalves because he was a moderate, but he was to move increasingly to the left as he headed four provisional governments between July 1974 and September 1975. Spínola's position further weakened when he was obliged to consent to the independence of Portugal's African colonies, rather than achieving the federal solution he had outlined in his book. Guinea-Bissau gained independence in early September, and talks were underway on the liberation of the other colonies. Spínola attempted to seize full power in late September but was blocked by COPCON and resigned from office. His replacement was the moderate General Francisco da Costa Gomes. Gonçalves formed a third provisional government with heavy MFA membership, nine military officers in all, and members of the PS, PCP, and PPD.

In the next year, Portuguese politics moved steadily leftward. The PCP was highly successful in placing its members in many national and local political and administrative offices, and it was consolidating its hold on the country's labor unions. The MFA came ever more under the control of its radical wing, and some of its members came under the influence of the PCP. In addition, smaller, more radical left-wing groups joined with the PCP in staging huge demonstrations that brought about the increasing adoption of leftist policies, including nationalizations of private companies.

An attempted uprising by Spínola in early March 1975 failed, and he fled the country. In response to this attack from the right, radical elements of the military abolished the Junta of National Salvation and formed the Council of the Revolution as the country's most powerful governing body. The council was made responsible to a 240-member radical military parliament, the Assembly of the Armed Forces. A fourth provisional government was formed, more radical than its predecessor, and was headed by Gonçalves, with eight military officers and members of the PS, PCP, PPD, and Portuguese Democratic Movement (Movimento Democrático Português – MDP), a party close to the PCP.

The new government began a wave of nationalizations of banks and large businesses. Because the banks were often holding companies, the government came after a time to own almost all the country's newspapers, insurance companies, hotels, construction companies and many other kinds of businesses, so that its share of the country's gross national product amounted to 70%.

== The transition to civilian rule ==
Elections were held on 25 April 1975 for the Constituent Assembly to draft a new constitution. The PS won nearly 38% the vote, while the PPD took 26.4%. The PCP won less than 13% of the vote. A democratic right-wing party, the Democratic and Social Centre (Partido do Centro Democrático e Social – CDS), came in fourth with less than 8%. Despite the fact that the elections took place in a period of revolutionary ferment, most Portuguese voted for middle-class parties committed to pluralistic democracy.

Many Portuguese regarded the elections as a sign that democracy was being effectively established. In addition, most members of the military welcomed the beginning of a transition to civilian democracy. Some elements of the MFA, however, had opposed the elections, agreeing to them only after working out an agreement with political parties that the MFA's policies would be carried out regardless of election results.

Following the elections came the Hot Summer of 1975 when the revolution made itself felt in the countryside. Landless agricultural laborers in the south seized the large farms on which they worked. Many estates in the Alentejo were confiscated—over 10,000 square kilometres in all—and transformed into collective farms. In the north, where most farms were small and owned by those who worked them, such actions did not occur. The north's small farmers, conservative property-owners, violently repulsed the attempts of radical elements and the PCP to collectivize their land. Some farmers formed right-wing organizations in defense of private landownership, a reversal of the region's early welcoming of the revolution.

Other revolutionary actions were met with hostility, as well. In mid-July, the PS and the PPD withdrew from the fourth provisional government to protest antidemocratic actions by radical military and leftist political forces. The PS newspaper República had been closed by radical workers, causing a storm of protest both domestically and abroad. The PS and other democratic parties were also faced with a potentially lethal threat to the new freedom posed by the PCP's open contempt for parliamentary democracy and its dominance in Portugal's main trade union, Intersindical, or as it came to be known in 1977, the General Confederation of the Portuguese Workers–National Inter-Union (Confederação Geral dos Trabalhadores Portugueses – Intersindical Nacional – CGTP-IN).

The United States and many West European countries expressed considerable alarm at the prospect of a Marxist-Leninist takeover in a NATO country. Spain in particular, which was preparing for the succession of Francisco Franco, even threatened to invade Portugal if communism began to spread across the border. United States Secretary of State Henry Kissinger told PS leader Soares that he would probably be the "Alexander Kerensky of Portugal". The result of these concerns was an influx of foreign financial aid into Portugal to shore up groups committed to pluralist parliamentary democracy.

By the time of the "hot summer" of 1975, several currents could be seen within the MFA. A moderate group, the Group of Nine, issued a manifesto in August that advocated nonaligned socialism along the lines of Scandinavian social democracy. Another group published a manifesto that criticized both the Group of Nine and those who had drawn close to the PCP and singled out Prime Minister Gonçalves for his links to the communists. These differences of opinion signaled the end of the fifth provisional government, in power only a month, under Gonçalves in early September. Gonçalves was subsequently expelled from the Council of the Revolution as this body became more moderate. The sixth provisional government was formed, headed by Admiral José Baptista Pinheiro de Azevedo; it included the leader of the Group of Nine and members of the PS, the PPD, and PCP. This government, which was to remain in power until July 1976, when the first constitutional government was formed, was pledged to adhere to the policies advocated by MFA moderates.

Evolving political stability did not reflect the country as a whole, which was on the verge of anarchy. Even the command structure of the military broke down. Political parties to the right of the PCP became more confident and increasingly fought for order, as did many in the military. The granting of independence to Mozambique in September 1975, and to Angola in November meant that the colonial wars were ended. The attainment of peace, the main aim of the military during all these months of political upheaval, was thus achieved, and the military could begin the transition to civilian rule. The polling results of the April 1975 constituent assembly elections legitimized the popular support given to the parties that could manage and welcome this transition.

A coup by left-wing military units in November 1975 led by Otelo Saraiva de Carvalho, referred to as the 25 of November, marked the decline of leftist influence in Portugal. In a counter-coup, Colonel António dos Santos Ramalho Eanes declared a state of emergency and sent loyal commandos to seize the city of Lisbon. Revolutionary units within Lisbon were quickly surrounded and forced to surrender; about 200 leftists were arrested, and COPCON was abolished. The communists' ability to institute its goals had diminished and people returned to their jobs and daily routines after eighteen months of political and social turmoil.

A degree of compromise among competing political visions of how the new state should be organized was reached, and the country's new Constitution was proclaimed on 2 April 1976, paving the way to the termination of the provisional governments and of the Ongoing Revolutionary Process. Several weeks later, on 25 April, elections for the new Parliament, the Assembly of the Republic, were held.

These elections could be said to be the definitive end of a period of revolution. Moderate democratic parties received most of the vote. Revolutionary achievements were not discarded, however. The constitution pledged the country to realize socialism. Furthermore, the constitution declared the extensive nationalizations and land seizures of 1975 irreversible. The military supported these commitments through a pact with the main political parties that guaranteed its guardian rights over the new democracy for four more years.

== Consolidation of democracy ==
After the adoption of the country's new Constitution in 1976, the first elections for the Assembly of the Republic, were won by the PS. It took 36.7% of the vote, compared with the 25.2% for the PPD, 16.7% for the CDS, and 15.2% for the PCP. Elections for the presidency were held in June and won easily by General António Ramalho Eanes, who enjoyed the backing of parties to the right of the communists: the PS, the PPD, and the CDS.

Although the PS did not have a majority in the Assembly of the Republic, Eanes allowed it to form the first constitutional government with Soares as prime minister. It governed from 23 July 1976, to 30 January 1978. A second government, formed from a coalition with the CDS, lasted from January to August 1978 and was also led by Soares. The PS governments faced enormous economic and social problems such as runaway inflation, high unemployment, falling wages, and an enormous influx of Portuguese settlers from Africa. Failure to fix the economy, even after adopting a painful austerity program imposed by the International Monetary Fund, ultimately forced the PS to relinquish power. However, the PS could be seen as having been successful in that it governed Portugal democratically for two years and helped thereby to consolidate the new political system. After the collapse of the PS-CDS coalition government in July 1978, President Eanes formed a number of caretaker governments in the hope that they would rule until the parliamentary elections mandated by the constitution could be held in 1980. There were, therefore, three short-lived governments appointed by President Eanes. These were led by Prime Minister Alfredo Nobre da Costa from 28 August, to 21 November 1978; Carlos Mota Pinto from 21 November 1978, to 31 July 1979; and Maria de Lourdes Pintasilgo (Portugal's first woman prime minister) from 31 July 1979, to 3 January 1980.

The weakness of these governments and the failure of the PS and the PPD, now renamed the Social Democratic Party (Partido Social Democrata – PSD), to form a coalition government forced President Eanes to call for interim elections to be held in December 1979. Francisco Sá Carneiro, the dynamic leader of the PSD and a fierce personal rival of Soares, put together a coalition of his own PSD along with the CDS, the People's Monarchist Party (Partido Popular Monárquico – PPM), and another small party to form the Democratic Alliance (Aliança Democrática – AD). The AD downplayed its intentions to revise the constitution to reverse the nationalizations and land seizures of the mid-1970s and advocated a moderate economic policy. The coalition won 45.2% of the vote in the elections, or 128 seats, for a majority of 3 in the 250-seat assembly. The PS, which had also formed an electoral coalition with several small left-wing groups, suffered a drubbing and won only 27.4%, a large drop compared with 1976 results. The PCP, in coalition with another left-wing party, gained slightly.

Francisco Sá Carneiro became prime minister in January 1980, and the tenor of parliamentary politics moved to the right as the government attempted to undo some of the revolution's radical reforms. The powers conferred on the presidency by the constitution of 1976 enabled President Eanes to block the AD's centrist economic policies. For this reason, the AD concentrated on winning enough seats in the October 1980 elections to reach a two-thirds majority to effect constitutional change and on electing someone other than Eanes in the presidential elections of December 1980.

Portuguese voters approved of the movement to the right, and in the parliamentary elections the AD coalition increased the number of its seats to 134, while the PS held steady at 74 seats and the PCP lost 6 seats for a total of 41. The AD's win was not complete, however, because President Eanes was easily reelected in December. In contrast to the election of 1976, when Eanes was supported by the PS and parties to its right, he was backed in 1980 by the PS, the PCP, and other left-wing parties. Voters admired Eanes for his integrity and obvious devotion to democracy. His election, however, made constitutional change less certain because the AD did not have by itself the required two-thirds majority. The AD also suffered a serious loss when its dynamic leader, Sá Carneiro, died in a plane crash just two days before the presidential election. His successor was Francisco Pinto Balsemão, the founder and editor of the Expresso newspaper.

The AD coalition remained in power until mid-1983, forming two governments with Balsemão as prime minister. In combination with the PS, which also desired fundamental changes in the political system, the AD was able to revise the constitution. Amendments were passed that enhanced the power of the prime minister and the Assembly of the Republic at the expense of the President. The role of the military in the running of the country was ended with the abolition of the Council of the Revolution. The Constitutional reform was promulgated in September 1982. The Council of the Revolution was replaced with two consultative bodies, linked to the office of the President. One of these, the Higher Council of National Defense, was limited to commenting on military matters. The other, the Council of State, was broadly representative of the entire country and did not have the power to prevent government and parliamentary actions by declaring them unconstitutional. The constitutional reform also created a Constitutional Court to review the constitutionality of legislation. Because ten of its thirteen judges were chosen by the Assembly of the Republic, it was under parliamentary control. Another important change reduced the president's power by restricting presidential ability to dismiss the government, dissolve parliament, or veto legislation. Also, the ideological tone of the Constitution was toned down, and several references to the goal of establishing a socialist order were softened or eliminated.

Although the AD government had achieved its main objective of amending the constitution, the country's economic problems worsened, and the coalition gradually lost popular support. Balsemão also tired of the constant political skirmishing needed to hold the AD together and resigned in December 1982. Unable to choose a successor, the AD broke apart. Parliamentary elections in April 1983 gave the PS a stunning victory that increased its parliamentary seats to 101. After long negotiations, the PS joined with the PSD to form a governing coalition, the Central Bloc (Bloco Central), with Soares as prime minister.

The Central Bloc government was fragile from its beginning and lasted only two years. Faced with serious and worsening economic problems, the government had to adopt an unpopular austerity policy. Administrative and personality difficulties made relations within the government tense and resulted in bitter parliamentary maneuvers. Overshadowing these difficulties was the upcoming presidential election in early 1986. Soares made clear his ambition to succeed Eanes, who, according to the constitution, was not allowed to seek a third consecutive term. A split within the PSD over its presidential candidate ended the coalition government in June 1985.

In new assembly elections held in October 1985, the PS, blamed by the public for the country's severe economic problems, such as a 10% fall in wages since 1983, suffered serious losses and lost almost half its seats in the Assembly of the Republic. The PCP's electoral coalition lost six seats; the PSD won thirteen more seats because of new leadership; and the CDS lost almost a third of its seats. The big winner was a party formed by supporters of President Eanes, the Democratic Renewal Party (Partido Renovador Democrático – PRD), which, although only months old, won nearly 18% of the vote and forty-five seats. The party's victory stemmed from the high regard Portuguese voters had for President Eanes.

No party emerged from the October 1985 elections with anything even close to an absolute majority. Hence, the 1985–87 period was unstable politically. The new head of the PSD, economist Aníbal Cavaco Silva, as prime minister headed a minority PSD government that managed to survive for only seventeen months. Its success was attributed partly to support from the PRD, which as a young party wished to establish itself, although it was a motion of censure presented by this party in the spring of 1987 that eventually brought the government down. Cavaco Silva also benefited from the internal dissension of other parties.

The presidential election of 1986 did not yield a winner in the first round. The candidate of the CDS and the PSD, Diogo Freitas do Amaral, won 46.3% of the vote compared with 25.4% for Mário Soares. Freitas do Amaral, candidate of a united right, profited from the left's mounting of three candidates. In the two-candidate runoff election in mid-February, Soares won with 51.3% of the vote, getting the support of most left-wing voters. The PCP supported him as the lesser of two evils, even though Soares repeatedly reminded voters that he, perhaps more than anyone else, had prevented the communists from coming to power in the mid-1970s.

Cavaco Silva came to have full control of his party, the PSD. As prime minister, he pushed for a liberalization of the economy. He was fortunate in that external economic trends and the infusion of funds from the European Community after Portugal became a member in 1986 enlivened the country's economy and began to bring an unaccustomed prosperity to Portuguese wage earners. Confident therefore that his party could win in parliamentary elections, Cavaco Silva maneuvered his political opponents into passing a vote of censure against his government in April 1987. Instead of asking for a new government composed of a variety of parties on the left, President Soares called for early elections in July.

Cavaco Silva had judged the political situation correctly. The PSD won just over 50% of the vote, which gave it an absolute majority in the parliament, the first single-party majority since the restoration of democracy in 1974. The strong mandate would enable Cavaco Silva to put forward a more clearly defined program and perhaps govern more effectively than his predecessors.

== See also ==
- PREC - Processo Revolucionário em Curso - Part of the Portuguese transition to democracy
- Spanish transition to democracy – which occurred along a similar time period
- Metapolitefsi – Greek democratization that began in 1974
- Democracy in Europe
