= Movement of Socialist Left =

Defunct socialist party in Portugal

- Founded: 20 February 1975
- Dissolved: 17 November 1997
- Ideology: Socialism; Christian socialism Progressive christianity
- Political position: Left-wing

The Movement of Socialist Left (Portuguese: Movimento de Esquerda Socialista, MES) was a Portuguese socialist party, founded in February 1975, a few months after the April 25, 1974 democratic Carnation Revolution. The party had its roots in a group of Progressive Christians and Radical Socialists who abandoned the Portuguese Democratic Movement/Democratic Electoral Commissions (CDE) in 1970, during the dictatorial regime led by Marcello Caetano, as well as student leaders from the 1969 struggles in Coimbra, other students, and trade unionists. In 1974, the initial group was joined by a group of dissidents from the Socialist Party (PS).

Ideologically to the left of the Socialist Party and close to the French Socialist Unity Party (PSU), the Italian Lotta Continua, or the Chilean Revolutionary Left Movement (MIR), it advocated autonomism and councilism. The party only participated in two elections, both parliamentary elections, in 1975 and 1976, polling 1.0% and 0.6%, respectively. Despite its brief existence and weak electoral results, it had a disproportionate impact, as some MES leaders, having later transferred to the Socialist Party, played a leading role in Portuguese politics, holding various positions in Parliament, the Government, and the Presidency of the Republic.

Among the Party's top figures were César Oliveira, Jorge Sampaio, João Cravinho, Ferro Rodrigues and Augusto Mateus. The majority of the Party's members would later join the Socialist Party, Jorge Sampaio would become the President of Portugal in 1996 and Ferro Rodrigues would become the leader of the Socialist Party and later Speaker of the Assembly of the Republic.

== Formation ==
The MES represented the confluence of trade unionists, militants of progressive Catholicism, intellectuals from various sectors, and members of academic associations, some of whom had been collaborating prior to the Revolution. Many of the first militants of the MES had been involved in opposition struggles against the dictatorship, notably the movement that, in 1969, contested the elections for the National Assembly, under the banner of the Democratic Electoral Commission (CDE). The formation of the MES was announced by the "Declaration of the Socialist Left Movement - M.E.S", signed by Jorge Sampaio, Augusto Mateus, Alberto Martins, and Eduardo Ferro Rodrigues, among others.

== Founding Congress ==
The founding Congress of the MES was held behind closed doors on December 21 and 22, 1974, at the Rectorate of the Classical University of Lisbon. At the opening of the Congress, those in attendance debated the report of the Executive Committee of the National Political Commission, which called for the nationalization of private banking and insurance, the nationalization of foreign trade, fishing and maritime transport, the expropriation of large estates, and the nationalization of some basic sectors of production. The delegates then elected a new National Political Commission. The MES also adopted bylaws, which described the MES as "a Marxist organization that fights for the construction of socialism in Portugal, that is, a society in which the workers, holding political power and possession of the means of production, organize it to satisfy the needs of the community and not for profit, putting an end to the slavery of wage labor and the division between manual and intellectual work, moving towards the construction of socialism". The MES declared its goal to be the creation of a classless society, in the form of workers' democracy, "which is the full freedom of self-organization of the working class and the progressive disappearance of the State". Jorge Sampaio, who would go on to serve as president of Portugal, left the MES, denouncing what he understood to be the prevalence of a radical line within the organization.

== Election for the Constituent Assembly (April 25, 1975) ==
The MES had a significant presence among officers serving in the military during the period of the April 25, 1974 Revolution, with some of its members assuming influential positions within the Armed Forces Movement (MFA). It ran in the elections for the Constituent Assembly on April 25, 1975, obtaining 57,695 votes, or one percent of the total.

== Participation in the Popular Unity Front ==
On August 25, 1975, the MES entered into the Popular Unity Front, along with the Portuguese Communist Party (PCP), the MDP/CDE, the Popular Socialist Front (FSP), the League of Revolutionary Unity and Action (LUAR), the Internationalist Communist League (LCI), the Proletarian Revolutionary Party (PRP), and the May 1st Group. The Popular Unity Front was created in large part to support the Fifth Provisional Government led by Vasco Gonçalves and in reaction to the demonstrations promoted and led by the PS - Socialist Party. However, on August 26, the May 1st Organization abandoned the movement, followed two days later by the PCP. From then on, the alliance was called the Revolutionary Unity Front (FUR). This would be dissolved a few weeks later, with the end of the Fifth Provisional Government in September 1975.

== Decline after November 25, 1975 ==
Following the failed coup of 25 November 1975, in which far left elements in the military sought to seize power, only to trigger a countercoup led by Ramalho Eanes, MES saw its popular support wane. After forming a short-lived electoral alliance with other left parties in 1976 but receiving even less support at the ballot box than in 1975, MES effectively went out of existence within a few years of its birth. It was formally dissolved on November 17, 1997, by the Constitutional Court.

Many of the figures who were active in MES would later join the Socialist Party, within which some went on to assume high positions as party leaders or in sovereign bodies, as was the case with Jorge Sampaio, Eduardo Ferro Rodrigues, José Manuel Galvão Teles, César de Oliveira, Augusto Mateus, Alberto Martins and Francisco Seixas da Costa.

== Publications ==
During its brief existence the MES published several newspapers and magazines, such as: Esquerda Socialista, Poder Popular, Acção Sindical, Informação Militante and A Luta Continua.

== Slogans and symbols ==
- MES Unity of the people – Against fascism – for popular power
- For popular power MES
- Vote MES for popular power
- MES the party of the revolutionary left
- Unity of the people against fascism – for popular power MES
- April 25th is alive – Freedom and national independence MES
- Otelo for president MES Unity and popular organization for victory
- MES Uniting the people – Against fascism – for popular power
- MES against rising prices – Popular resistance
- MES Unite Resist Fight Win
- Resist to win
- Azores – Autonomy with the power of those who work MES

== Electoral Results ==
Results in Parliamentary Elections (year links to election article)
Year	Coalition	Type of Election	Voting	%	Mandates
1975	none	Constituent Assembly	58,248	01.0%	0
1976	none	Portuguese Parliament	31,332	00.6%	0

(source: Portuguese Electoral Commission)
