= Group of Nine (Portugal) =

The Group of Nine (Portuguese: Grupo dos Nove) was a group of nine moderate military officers in the Portuguese Armed Forces, led by Melo Antunes, who participated in the Movimento das Forças Armadas that brought about the Carnation Revolution.

The progressive group published in August 1975 a manifesto, known as the Documento dos Nove, to clarify the political positions and ideologies within and outside the Armed Forces.

The original signatories were nine prominent figures in the 1974 Revolution: Ernesto Melo Antunes, Vasco Lourenço, Pezarat Correia, Manuel Franco Charais, Canto e Castro, Costa Neves, Sousa e Castro, Vítor Alves, and Vítor Crespo. This military group refused to accept the socialist and social democratic models that were prevalent at the time. Instead, the group offered another model of socialism based on political democracy, pluralism, personal liberties and fundamental human rights. This group represented a moderate faction of the MFA, and supported the Aliança Povo/MFA. Para a construção da sociedade socialista em Portugal document, which they presented on 8 July 1975.

The group was supported by the principal political parties at the time (PS, PSD and CDS) and opposed by forces aligned with the far-left of the political spectrum linked to Prime Minister Vasco Gonçalves and Otelo Saraiva de Carvalho.

The environment that existed in Portugal during the summer of 1975 (referred to as the Verão Quente), affected the tense conditions where radical military officers occupied parachute company bases, making a response from military forces controlled by the Group of Nine. The military response was presented to Francisco da Costa Gomes (President of the Republic at the time) who broadcast the state of events for the region of Lisbon. Vasco Lourenço (member of the MFA Coordinating group), Jaime Neves (commander of the Comandos of Amadora) and Lieutenant Colonel António Ramalho Eanes (forces coordinator for the Group of Nine, and future president). Also, from here, Salgueiro Maia left with colleagues in the EPCS for Lisbon to support the positions of the Group of Nine. From many, this was the date the PREC terminated.
