= 1976 Portuguese legislative election =

- 25 April 1976

All 263 seats in the Assembly of the Republic 132 seats needed for a majority
- Registered: 6,564,667 ▲5.4%
- Turnout: 5,483,461 (83.5%) ▼8.2 pp
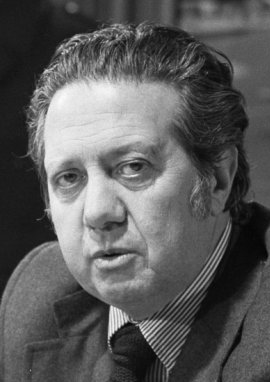

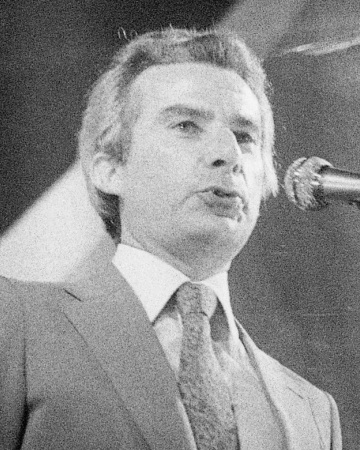

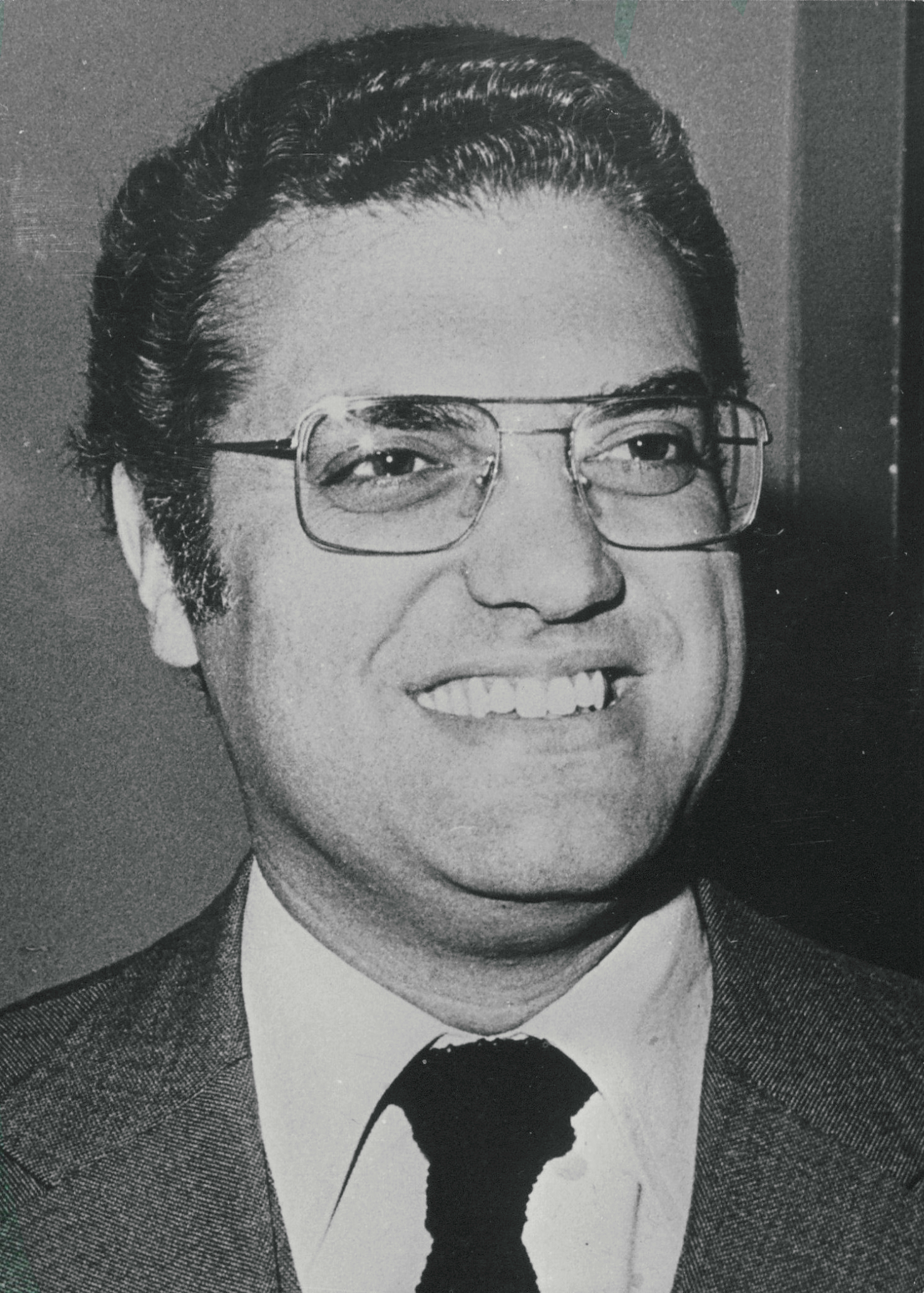

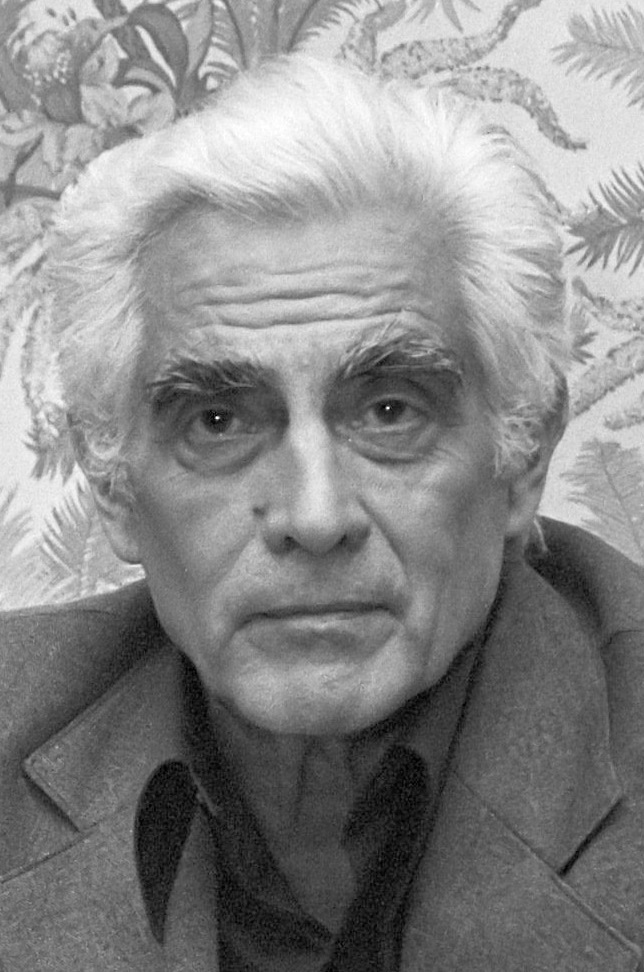

	First party	Second party	Third party
Leader	Mário Soares	Francisco Sá Carneiro	Diogo Freitas do Amaral
Party	PS	PPD	CDS
Leader since	19 April 1973	6 May 1974	19 July 1974
Leader's seat	Lisbon	Porto	Lisbon
Last election	116 seats, 37.9%	81 seats, 26.4%	16 seats, 7.6%
Seats won	107	73	42
Seat change	▼9	▼8	▲26
Popular vote	1,912,921	1,335,381	876,007
Percentage	34.9%	24.4%	16.0%
Swing	▼3.0 pp	▼2.0 pp	▲8.4 pp
	Fourth party	Fifth party
Leader	Álvaro Cunhal	Acácio Barreiros
Party	PCP	UDP
Leader since	31 March 1961	1976
Leader's seat	Lisbon	Lisbon
Last election	30 seats, 12.5%	1 seat, 0.8%
Seats won	40	1
Seat change	▲10	0
Popular vote	788,830	91,690
Percentage	14.4%	1.7%
Swing	▲1.9 pp	▲0.9 pp
Prime Minister before election
Vasco de Almeida e Costa (interim)
Independent
Prime Minister after election
Mário Soares
PS

The 1976 Portuguese legislative election was held on Sunday 25 April, exactly one year after the previous election, and two years after the Carnation Revolution. With a new Constitution approved, the country's main aim was economic recovery and strengthening its democratic institutions. The election renewed all 263 members of the Assembly of the Republic.

The Socialist Party came in first place with a plurality of votes and seats, almost 35 percent and 107 seats, despite losing some ground compared to the previous year, and its leader, Mário Soares, became prime minister of the first constitutional government, a minority one, on 23 July 1976. However, its minority status, coupled with the country's fragile economic and social situation, led to deadlocks in parliament, later forcing a short-lived and unsuccessful coalition with the CDS, a right-wing party.

The Social Democratic Party (then known as the Democratic People's Party, PPD) obtained the second most votes and seats, 24 percent and 73 seats, but trailed the PS by 10 percentage points and also lost ground compared to the previous year's election. The Portuguese Communist Party (PCP) made some gains that reflected its influence mainly in the south of the country, gaining 14% of the seats and 40 seats. The big surprise in the election was the strong showing of the Democratic and Social Center (CDS), which polled ahead of PCP and gathered 16 percent of the votes and 42 seats. Only 19 years later, in 1995, would the CDS again surpass the PCP in number of votes. The Popular Democratic Union (UDP) was able to hold on to its sole seat.

Voter turnout fell to 83.5 percent, compared with the 91.7 percent just a year before.

== Background ==
=== Ongoing Revolutionary Process ===
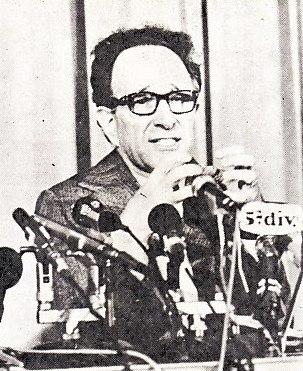
Vasco Gonçalves speaking during his term as Prime Minister.

The previous election, held on 25 April 1975, elected a constituent assembly to write a new Constitution. The election results gave the two main moderate parties (PS and PPD) a clear majority in Parliament, with almost 38 percent for the PS and more than 26 percent for the PPD. The PCP achieved a weak result, just 12.5 percent, while CDS polled ahead of MDP/CDE. The election results started a conflict of legitimacy between parties, the Armed Forces Movement and the Revolutionary Council. The Ongoing Revolutionary Process was in full swing, which culminated in the Hot Summer of 1975.

On 1 May 1975, the PS and the PCP held separate rallies and some violent clashes occurred between their supporters. A few days later, in what was called "the República case", far-left supporters invaded the headquarters of República newspaper. The reason was a strike by typographers and other workers, many close to the far-left UDP, accusing the editorial board of being too aligned with the PS. The case drew widespread international attention, and the PS started a full blown attack against the Communists and prime minister Vasco Gonçalves' government.

Positions become extreme as Vasco Gonçalves led the Ongoing Revolutionary Process, facing big opposition from the so-called "reactionaries" (the Catholic Church, groups close to the former Estado Novo regime and, unofficially, from the PS, PPD and CDS), by imposing his democratic socialism policies, mainly the nationalization of huge parts of the Portuguese economy.

=== Hot Summer of 1975 ===
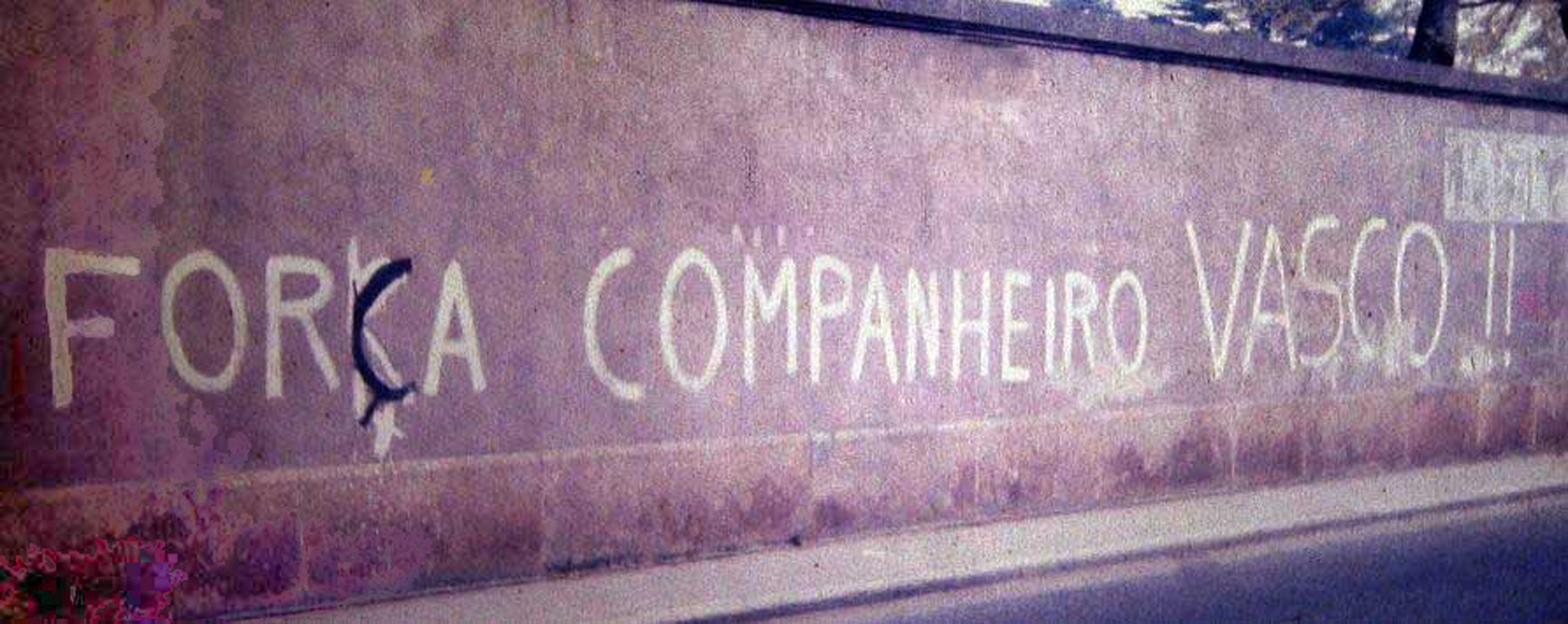
Mural about Gonçalves during 1975.

By the beginning of the summer of 1975, the country was deeply divided, and the so-called "Hot summer of 1975" was starting. During this period, huge clashes between left and right supporters spread all across the country, some with great violence, and the possibility of the country entering in a full blown civil war was feared by many. On 19 July 1975, the PS held a massive rally in Lisbon, with the help of the Catholic Church and others, against the PCP and Vasco Gonçalves' government, with party leader Mário Soares accusing the Gonçalves government, and those who support it, of being "paranoids", "demented" and "irresponsibles who do not represent the Portuguese people".

During the summer of 1975, headquarters of the PCP, and other left-wing parties, in many cities in the North and Center of the country were vandalized and destroyed, with many leftwing supporters being also violently beaten by anti-left protesters. The violence and increased tensions across the country were damaging Vasco Gonçalves leadership in the government, and divisions between the Armed Forces Movement and the Revolutionary Council started to appear. When COPCON commander, Otelo Saraiva de Carvalho, withdrew his support from Gonçalves, the government was on its last days, and, on 20 September, Gonçalves leaves the government with Pinheiro de Azevedo being nominated as the new prime minister. Shortly after, on 26 September, the assault of the Spanish embassy in Lisbon by far-left supporters, in retaliation to the attacks on left-wing parties headquarters in the North and Center, drew widespread attention as it was broadcast by US network CBS. By this time, thousands of Portuguese citizens from the African colonies, up to 600,000 and called returnees, were arriving at Portugal, facing discrimination and some difficulties adapting to the country, with the Democratic Social Center (CDS) becoming a leading voice in support for the returnees.

=== 25 November Coup and normalization ===
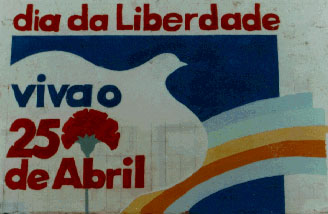
1975 mural referent to the 25 of April.

The new government was unable to control tensions in the country and, in mid-November, made the extraordinary announcement that it would go on strike because it was impossible to govern the country. Just before this announcement, construction workers unions laid siege to Parliament and blocked MPs from leaving the building for two days.

All of this came to a head in the events of the coup of 25 November 1975. The coup was a failed attempt by left-wing activists who hoped to hijack the Portuguese transition to democracy in favor of the Communists, and shortly after a counter-coup led by general Ramalho Eanes, a pro-democracy moderate, re-established the democratic process.

By early 1976, the Constituent Assembly finally drafted the text of the Constitution, which was sent for approval in April. The Constitution draft was heavily ideological, with many left-wing references and establishing "the transition to socialism". On 2 April 1976, the new Constitution was approved with the votes of all parties with the exception of CDS, which voted against citing the ideological content of the document, however the party agreed to abide by it in the interim.

== Electoral system ==
The Assembly of the Republic has 263 members elected to four-year terms. The total number of MPs increased to 263 from the 1975 total of 250 MPs. Governments do not require absolute majority support of the Assembly to hold office, as even if the number of opposers of government is larger than that of the supporters, the number of opposers still needs to be equal or greater than 132 (absolute majority) for both the Government's Programme to be rejected or for a motion of no confidence to be approved.

The number of seats assigned to each district depends on the district magnitude. The use of the d'Hondt method makes for a higher effective threshold than certain other allocation methods such as the Hare quota or Sainte-Laguë method, which are more generous to small parties.

For these elections, and compared with the 1975 elections, the MPs distributed by districts were the following:

District	Number of MPs	Map
Lisbon^{(+3)}	58	
Porto^{(+2)}	38	
Setúbal^{(+1)}	17	
Aveiro^{(+1)} and Braga	15	
Santarém	13	
Coimbra	12	
Leiria and Viseu^{(+1)}	11	
Faro	9	
Castelo Branco, Viana do Castelo^{(+1)} and Vila Real^{(+1)}	7	
Beja, Évora^{(+1)}, Guarda and Funchal	6	
Bragança^{(+1)}	5	
Portalegre	4	
Ponta Delgada	3	
Angra do Heroísmo, Europe and Outside Europe	2	
Horta	1	

== Parties ==
The table below lists the parties represented in the Assembly of the Republic during the Constitutional Assembly (1975–1976) and that also, some, contested the elections:

Name		Ideology	Political position	Leader	1975 result		Seats at dissolution
Name		Ideology	Political position	Leader	%	Seats	Seats at dissolution
PS	Socialist Party; Partido Socialista	Social democracy	Centre-left	Mário Soares	37.9%	116 / 250	116 / 250
PPD	Democratic People's Party; Partido Popular Democrático	Liberalism	Centre	Francisco; Sá Carneiro	26.4%	81 / 250	60 / 250
PCP	Portuguese Communist Party; Partido Comunista Português	Communism	Far-left	Álvaro Cunhal	12.5%	30 / 250	30 / 250
CDS	Democratic and Social Center; Centro Democrático e Social	Christian democracy	Centre-right	Diogo Freitas do Amaral	7.6%	16 / 250	16 / 250
MDP/CDE (Note: Portuguese Democratic Movement won 5 seats and the Independent Democratic Association of Macau won 1 seat in the 1975 election. Neither party contested this election.)	Portuguese Democratic Movement; Movimento Democrático Português	Left-wing nationalism Democratic socialism	Left-wing	José Manuel; Tengarrinha	4.1%	5 / 250	5 / 250
UDP	Popular Democratic Union; União Democrática Popular	Marxism; Socialism	Left-wing	Mário Tomé	0.8%	1 / 250	1 / 250
ADIM	Association for the Defense of Macau Interests; Associação para a Defesa dos Interesses de Macau	Conservatism; Macau interests	Right-wing	Diamantino; Ferreira	0.0%	1 / 250	1 / 250
Ind.	Independent; Independente	Various PPD members					21 / 250

=== Seat changes ===
- On 9 December 1975, a total of 21 PPD MPs, including the party's caucus leader, Carlos Mota Pinto, left the party and became Independents, following deep disagreements with party leader Francisco Sá Carneiro regarding the party's ideology and policies.

== Campaign period ==
=== Issues ===
The campaign was dominated by the "hangover" from the previous two years, with economic problems, increased violence, social issues, and fierce divisions within and between parties and society, in addition to a halfhearted electorate. Despite this backdrop of uncertainty, during the campaign, Socialist (PS) leader Mário Soares rejected any post-election coalition, preferring a minority government, while the Democratic People's Party (PPD) insisted on the need for governmental stability and showed a propensity for agreements with the conservative Democratic and Social Center (CDS), which criticized the revolutionary process of the two preceding years, and presented itself as the non-socialist alternative. The Communist Party (PCP) campaigned on defeating the "reactionary right". The campaign was also affected by the "Wallraff case", that revealed plans by former president António de Spínola to carry out another coup d'état with the help of far-right elements.

=== Party slogans ===
Party or alliance	Original slogan	English translation	Refs
PS	« Queremos e podemos reconstruir o país »	"We want and we can rebuild the country"	
PPD	« Portugal com Sá Carneiro »	"Portugal with Sá Carneiro"	
PCP	« Para uma maioria de esquerda »	"For a left-wing majority"	
CDS	« A resposta é muito simples »	"The answer is very simple"	

=== Candidates' debates ===
The day after the elections, a round table was held on RTP1, moderated by Carlos Veiga Pereira, on the electoral results, with the participation of Mário Soares (Socialist Party), Francisco Sá Carneiro, (Social Democratic Party), Diogo Freitas do Amaral (Social Democratic Center), and Filipe Faria (UDP). Álvaro Cunhal (Portuguese Communist Party) declined to participate in the roundtable.

1975 Portuguese Constituent Assembly election
Date	Organisers	Moderator(s)	P Present S Absent invitee N Non-invitee					
Date	Organisers	Moderator(s)	PS	PPD	CDS	PCP	UDP	Refs
26 Apr	RTP1	Carlos Veiga Pereira	Soares	Sá Carneiro	Freitas	A	Faria	

== Results ==
=== National summary ===
Party	Votes	%	+/–	Seats	+/–
Socialist Party	1,912,921	34.89	–2.98	107	–9
Democratic People's Party	1,335,381	24.35	–2.04	73	–8
Democratic and Social Centre	876,007	15.98	+8.37	42	+26
Portuguese Communist Party	788,830	14.39	+1.93	40	+10
Popular Democratic Union	91,690	1.67	+0.88	1	0
People's Socialist Front	42,162	0.77	–0.39	0	0
Reorganizing Movement of the Party of the Proletariat	36,200	0.66	New	0	New
Movement of Socialist Left	31,332	0.57	–0.45	0	0
Christian Democratic Party	29,874	0.54	New	0	New
People's Monarchist Party	28,320	0.52	–0.05	0	0
Internationalist Communist League	16,269	0.30	+0.11	0	0
Communist Party of Portugal	15,830	0.29	New	0	New
Worker–Peasant Alliance	15,778	0.29	New	0	New
Workers' Revolutionary Party	5,171	0.09	New	0	New
Total	5,225,765	100.00	–	263	+13
Valid votes	5,225,765	95.30	+2.24		
Invalid/blank votes	257,696	4.70	–2.24		
Total votes	5,483,461	100.00	–		
Registered voters/turnout	6,564,667	83.53	–8.13		
Source: Comissão Nacional de Eleições

Vote share
PS	34.89%
PPD	24.35%
CDS	15.98%
PCP	14.39%
UDP	1.67%
FSP	0.77%
MRPP	0.66%
MES	0.57%
PDC	0.54%
PPM	0.52%
Others	0.97%
Blank/Invalid	4.70%

Parliamentary seats
PS	40.68%
PPD	27.76%
CDS	15.97%
PCP	15.51%
UDP	0.38%

=== Distribution by constituency ===
Results of the 1976 election of the Portuguese Assembly of the Republic by constituency
Constituency	%	S	%	S	%	S	%	S	%	S	Total S
Constituency	PS		PPD		CDS		PCP		UDP		Total S
Angra do Heroísmo	30.4	1	51.8	1	12.1	-	1.5	-			2
Aveiro	30.8	5	35.2	6	22.5	4	3.7	-	0.9	-	15
Beja	32.0	2	8.2	-	4.2	-	44.0	4	2.2	-	6
Braga	32.3	6	28.6	5	21.2	4	4.2	-	1.0	-	15
Bragança	22.6	1	33.3	2	28.3	2	2.7	-	0.8	-	5
Castelo Branco	36.4	3	22.6	2	19.9	2	6.7	-	1.1	-	7
Coimbra	40.9	6	26.7	4	12.5	1	7.3	1	1.2	-	12
Évora	30.3	2	9.2	-	8.0	-	43.2	4	2.6	-	6
Faro	44.6	6	19.3	2	6.8	-	14.5	1	2.6	-	9
Funchal	24.9	1	53.0	4	13.3	1	1.5	-	1.3	-	6
Guarda	25.2	2	25.7	2	32.1	2	2.9	-	1.1	-	6
Horta	34.2	-	57.0	1	4.3	-	1.5	-			1
Leiria	31.1	4	31.2	4	19.4	2	7.3	1	1.0	-	11
Lisbon	38.3	25	16.4	10	13.2	8	21.8	14	2.6	1	58
Ponta Delgada	35.4	1	45.6	2	11.8	-	1.5	-			3
Portalegre	41.9	3	10.1	-	13.9	-	22.0	1	1.0	-	4
Porto	40.7	18	27.0	11	15.7	6	8.4	3	1.5	-	38
Santarém	38.5	6	19.5	3	13.9	2	16.1	2	1.7	-	13
Setúbal	32.2	7	8.4	1	4.4	-	44.4	9	2.8	-	17
Viana do Castelo	25.5	2	32.8	3	23.5	2	6.6	-	0.9	-	7
Vila Real	26.3	2	39.0	4	18.3	1	3.1	-	0.9	-	7
Viseu	23.0	3	32.2	4	31.2	4	2.3	-	0.9	-	11
Europe	46.1	1	32.2	1	6.9	-	10.1	-	0.8	-	2
Rest of the World	6.3	-	53.2	1	33.7	1	1.4	-	0.4	-	2
Total	34.9	107	24.4	73	16.0	42	14.4	40	1.7	1	263
Source: Comissão Nacional de Eleições

=== 5 largest municipalities ===
Results in the five largest municipalities
Municipality	PS	PPD	CDS	PCP	UDP	Others	Turnout
Lisbon	36.9 (205,659)	17.2 (95,751)	16.6 (92,250)	19.2 (106,897)	2.8 (15,626)	4.3 (23,571)	82.8
Porto	38.8 (81,879)	26.0 (54,892)	16.4 (34,583)	12.0 (25,418)	2.5 (5,239)	1.9 (3,968)	88.2
Oeiras	38.9 (61,860)	14.4 (22,982)	10.6 (16,899)	26.6 (42,330)	3.1 (4,918)	3.9 (6,230)	83.5
Loures	41.5 (55,380)	11.8 (15,754)	7.2 (9,669)	29.2 (39,028)	2.4 (3,183)	4.6 (6,173)	84.6
Vila Nova de Gaia	46.6 (58,165)	25.5 (31,978)	11.8 (14,862)	9.0 (11,227)	1.4 (1,756)	2.0 (2,501)	89.5

=== Highest and lowest by party ===
Highest and lowest results by party
Party	Highest	Lowest
Socialist Party (PS)	Olhão (56.0)	Calheta, Azores (4.7)
Democratic People's Party (PPD)	Ponta do Sol (84.2)	Moita (4.1)
Democratic and Social Centre (CDS)	Sátão (50.5)	Santa Cruz da Graciosa (1.2)
Portuguese Communist Party (PCP)	Moita (61.8)	Porto Moniz (0.3)
Popular Democratic Union (UDP)	Borba (7.4)	Pedrógão Grande (0.2)

=== Maps ===
Winner and seats by constituency.

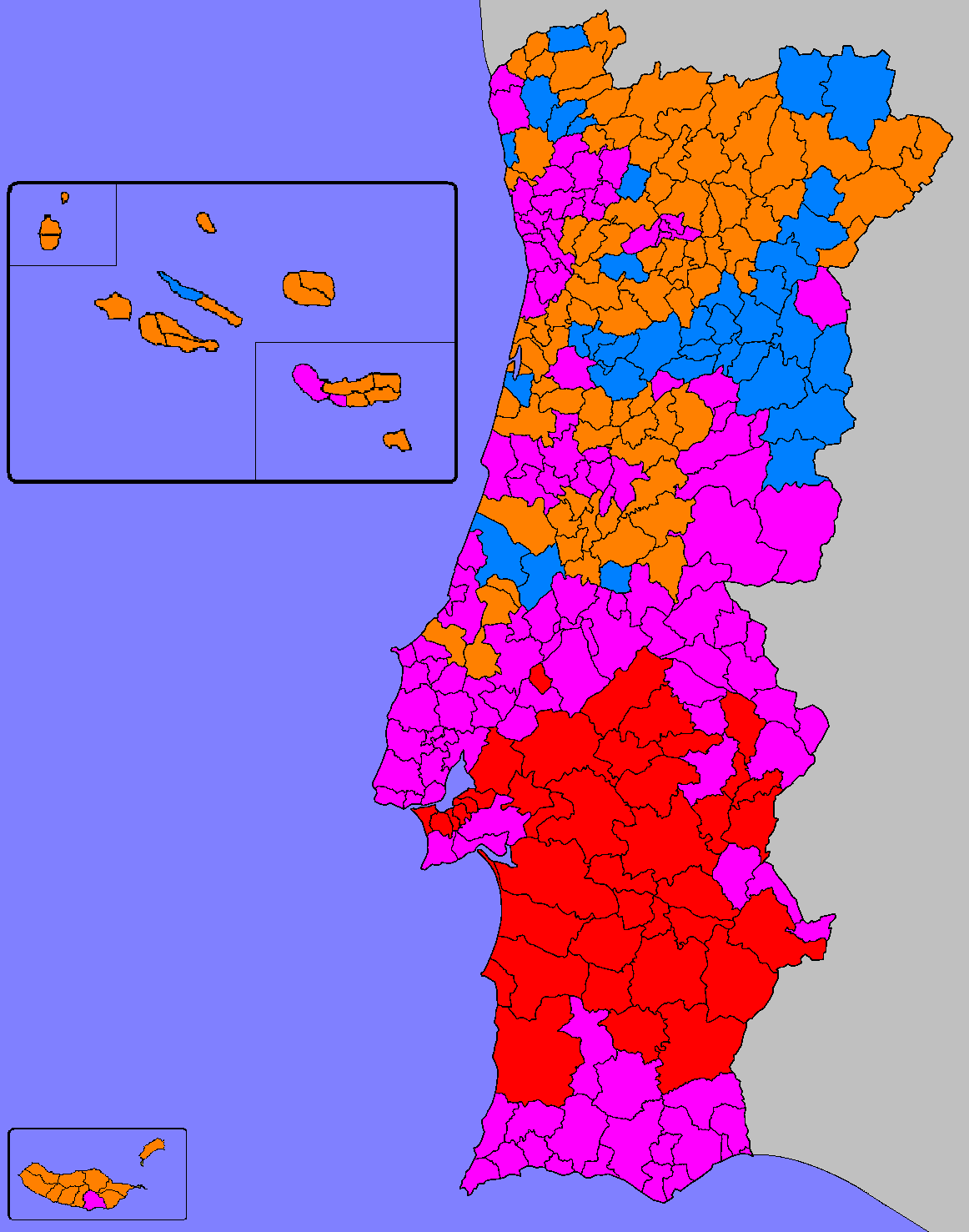
Most voted political force by municipality.

== Aftermath ==
=== Fall of the government ===
By the fall of 1977, the situation of the Portuguese economy was deteriorating. During that year's summer, Prime Minister Mário Soares asked for a loan from the International Monetary Fund (IMF) and several austerity measures were implemented, like the rise of interest rates, the devalue of the Escudo and budget cuts. However, the policies were very unpopular and by late 1977, Soares was facing large opposition in Parliament. In November 1977, he proposed a sizeable memorandum between parties and associations to seek common economic and social policies, which was rejected. Because of this rejection, Soares presented a motion of confidence in Parliament, which he lost by a 59 vote margin.

Motion of confidence Mário Soares (PS)
Ballot →	8 December 1977
Required majority →	Simple
Yes: • PS (100)	100 / 263
No: • PSD (72); • CDS (41); • PCP (40); • UDP (1); • Ind. Carmelinda Pereira (1); • Ind. Aires Rodrigues (1); • Ind. José Justiniano Pinto (1); • Ind. António Lopes Cardoso (1); • Ind. Reinaldo Rodrigues (1)	159 / 263
Abstentions	0 / 263
Absentees: • PS (2); • PSD (1); • Ind. Carlos Galvão de Melo (1)	4 / 263
Result →	Rejected

Following this vote, Soares was still able to form a second cabinet, in coalition with the Democratic Social Center (CDS), classified as "putting socialism in the drawer", but it only lasted 8 months as divisions regarding policy, mainly the agrarian reform, led to the collapse of the coalition. Soares was dismissed from office by President Eanes, and after August 1978, a couple of failed presidential appointed cabinets were nominated, culminating in the 2 December 1979 special election.

== See also ==
- I Constitutional Government of Portugal
- Politics of Portugal
- List of political parties in Portugal
- Elections in Portugal
