= Ongoing Revolutionary Process =

Tumultuous period in 1975 during the Portuguese transition to democracy

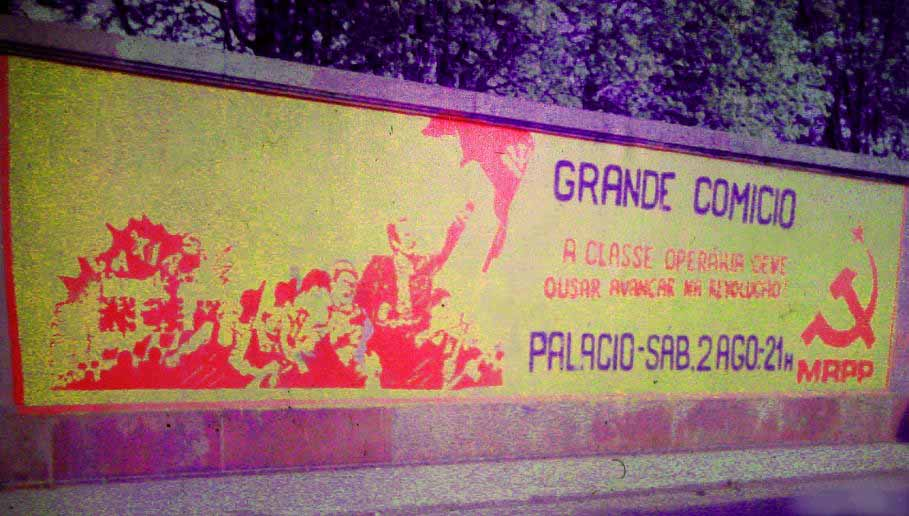
- A Maoist revolutionary mural in Porto, Portugal 1975.
- Date: 11 March – 25 November 1975
- Location: Portugal
- Motive: Democracy; Socialism; Communism; Decolonization
- Participants: Armed Forces Movement; COPCON; Portuguese Communist Party; Socialist Party
- Outcome: Portuguese Constitution of 1976; Portuguese presidential election, 1976

The Ongoing Revolutionary Process (Portuguese: Processo Revolucionário em Curso, PREC) was the period during the Portuguese transition to democracy starting after a failed right-wing coup d'état on 11 March 1975, and ended after a failed left-wing coup d'état on 25 November 1975. This far-left politics, labour movement-inspired period was marked by political turmoil, right-wing and left-wing violence, instability, the nationalization of companies, forcible occupation and expropriation of private lands as well as talent and capital flight.

== Background ==
By 1974, a fifth of Portugal's total government spending and the vast majority of its armed forces were engaged in wars in three of Portugal's African colonies. Whereas other European powers had ceded independence to their former African colonies in the 1960s, Portuguese dictator António Salazar had refused to even countenance the option of independence. He had earlier resisted decolonization for the province of Goa, first occupied by the Portuguese in the 16th century, but was powerless to intervene when the Indian army marched in and incorporated the province into India in 1961. Salazar took the unusual step of appealing to the United Nations against the Indian action but was shunned (see Invasion of Goa). In 1968 Salazar's successor Marcelo Caetano continued the costly war in the colonies. By 1973, Portuguese control of Portuguese Guinea was collapsing rapidly. In Angola and Mozambique, it faced several guerrilla groups, like the Soviet-backed MPLA in Angola and FRELIMO in Mozambique. Losses in its conscript army, increasing military expenses, and the determination of the government to remain in control of the overseas territories disillusioned and radicalized the junior officers (the "captains") and even led right-of-centre General António de Spínola to openly criticize the government's colonial policy. The junior officers formed the backbone of the military revolt against Caetano and the eventual overthrow of the Estado Novo regime.

Portugal's right-wing, authoritarian dictatorship had taken root when Salazar assumed the role of Prime Minister in 1932 having been Minister of Finance since 1928. The regime evolved into a classic fascist dictatorship heavily influenced by the corporatist ideas of Benito Mussolini in Italy. This was evidenced in the formation of the Estado Novo – the new state – and the permanent rule of the governing party. Trade unions were to be vertically integrated into the state machine. By 1974, this lack of democracy in a western European country came under increasing criticism from within and abroad. Amnesty International was formed after the experience of its founder who encountered examples of torture in Portugal.

Salazar's personal ideology was pro-Catholic, anti-communist anti-liberal and nationalistic. Economic policy was frequently protectionist and mercantilist. While the two countries on the Iberian peninsula experienced economic growth in the 1960s and 1970s – largely as a source of low cost labour and tourist destinations – poverty and illiteracy remained high. Portugal experienced high levels of emigration and this remains a feature of the economy today.

The revolution led to an explosion of political activity with sixty political parties active at one point. The Portuguese Communist Party had long operated underground under the leadership of Álvaro Cunhal. Though its electoral support was limited, its position in the trade unions and countryside gave the party huge influence. A combination of this and the country's poverty levels as well as a lack of social and economic development gave impetus to calls for nationalisation. By different estimates, sixty to eighty per cent of the economy was taken over after the revolution. For many on the left in Portugal, the 1974 revolution had overthrown both the Estado Novo dictatorship and those economic forces that had benefited from it and marked the beginning of the establishment of a much sought-after dictatorship of the proletariat in the style of restructuring society through dual power. Only in the 1980s did the centre-right gain power in Portugal and backtracked the economy to a market capitalist society, similar to the pre-revolution conditions.

== The revolution ==
Two indirect consequences of the Carnation Revolution were a collapse of the economy and dislocation of hundreds of thousands of people who returned from the colonies to Portugal as refugees.

=== The retornados ===
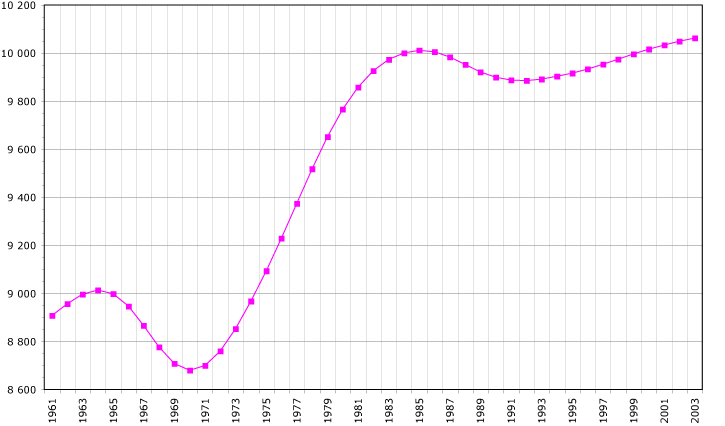
Portuguese population 1961–2003, in thousands, (2005 Data from FAO) with emigration giving way to retornados, ranging from 500,000 to 1 million after the revolution.

The retornados (from the Portuguese verb retornar, to return) are a Portuguese population who fled their overseas colonies during the decolonization process which was managed by the revolutionary National Salvation Junta, in the months following the Carnation Revolution.

After the military coup of 25 April 1974 Portugal faced political turmoil and the colonial army—often highly politicised by the Salazar Regime and the Independence Wars—returned home, bringing with them much of the European populations of Portuguese Angola, Portuguese Mozambique and to a lesser extent Portuguese Guinea and Portuguese Timor. From May 1974 to the end of the 1970s, over a million Portuguese citizens from Portugal's African territories (mostly from Portuguese Angola and Mozambique) and Portuguese Timor left those territories as destitute refugees—the retornados. The exact number of refugees who arrived in Portugal is unclear; estimates range from 500,000 to 1 million. Some, especially from the military, came into conflict with the communist wing of the new government, and their involvement fed into both right-wing and pro-democracy political forces, which thwarted an attempted coup by radical leftist military units on 25 November 1975. Among these forces were the Salazarist Army for Portuguese Liberation (ELP) and the Democratic Movement for the Liberation of Portugal (MDLP), led by António de Spínola and funded by Francoists. These groups carried out a number of attacks and bombings during the Hot Summer of 1975, mostly in northern Portugal, and the MDLP orchestrated the failed coup of 11 March. When Spínola and his allies came to power in November, the MDLP disbanded while the ELP continued its campaign.

The term retornado is seen as derogatory, as most of them prefer the term "refugee".

=== Post-colonial ===
After the fall of the Portuguese Empire and the overseas territories' independence, Angola ignited a decades long civil war, ultimately becoming a proxy war for the Soviet Union, Cuba, South Africa, and the United States. An estimated 800,000 Angolans died either as a direct consequence of the war or of malnutrition and disease. Mozambique would also enter into a devastating civil war that left it as one of the poorest and least developed nations in the world. Shortly after East Timor independence, the island was invaded by Indonesia. The invasion and subsequent occupation resulted in an estimated 100,000 - 200,000 East Timorese deaths.

=== Economy ===
The Portuguese economy had changed significantly by 1973 prior to the revolution. Compared with its position in 1961: Total output (GDP at factor cost) had grown by 120 percent in real terms. Clearly, the pre-revolutionary period was characterized by robust annual growth rates for GDP (6.9 percent), industrial production (9 percent), private consumption (6.5 percent), and gross fixed capital formation (7.8 percent).

Shortly after the Carnation Revolution, the change of direction from a purely pro-democracy coup to a communist-inspired one, became known as the Processo Revolucionário em Curso (PREC). Abandoning its moderate-reformist posture, the revolutionaries of the Movimento das Forças Armadas (MFA) leadership set out on a course of sweeping nationalizations and land expropriations. Wide powers were handed over to the working class always having the concept of dictatorship of the proletariat in mind. The lasting effects of this hampered Portugal's economic growth and development for years to come. During the balance of that year, the government nationalized all Portuguese-owned capital in the banking, insurance, petrochemical, fertilizer, tobacco, cement, and wood pulp sectors of the economy, as well as the Portuguese iron and steel company, major breweries, large shipping lines, most public transport, two of the three principal shipyards, core companies of the Companhia União Fabril (CUF) conglomerate, radio and TV networks (except those of the Roman Catholic Church), and companies in the glass, mining, fishing, and agricultural sectors. Because of the key role of the domestic banks as holders of stock, the government indirectly acquired equity positions in hundreds of other firms. An Institute for State Participation was created to deal with the many disparate and often tiny enterprises in which the state had thus obtained a majority shareholding. Another 300 small to medium enterprises came under public management as the government "intervened" to rescue them from bankruptcy following their takeover by workers or abandonment by management. Several high-profile entrepreneurs had to leave the country due to the pro-communist radicalism of both a section of the population and the new revolutionary leadership in charge of the government - the Junta de Salvação Nacional (National Salvation Junta).

In the longer term, after the reversal of the PREC, the Carnation Revolution led to democracy and Portugal's 1986 entrance into the European Economic Community.

In the agricultural sector, the collective farms set up in Alentejo after the 1974–75 expropriations due to the leftist military coup of 25 April 1974, proved incapable of modernizing, and their efficiency declined. According to government estimates, about 900,000 hectares (2,200,000 acres) of agricultural land were occupied between April 1974 and December 1975 in the name of land reform; about 32% of the occupations were later ruled illegal. In 1976, Évora hosted the First Agrarian Reform Conference on 30 and 31 October, the conclusions of which stated that there were 450 state-owned collective farms in Portugal, which were known as Collective Production Units (UCP) and had become increasingly overstaffed and economically inefficient. The following year, at the second conference, there were already 540 UCPs, occupying an area of 1,130,000 hectares. In January 1976, the government pledged to restore the illegally occupied land to its owners, and in 1977, it promulgated the Land Reform Review Law which became known as Lei Barreto (Barreto Law), named so after António Barreto, Portuguese Agriculture Minister from 1976 to 1978. Restoration of illegally occupied land began in 1978.

== Political changes ==
Portugal's earlier experience with democracy before the Carnation Revolution of 1974 was contentious and short-lived. The First Republic took power in 1910 from a monarchy in decline and itself lasted only sixteen years until 1926. Under the Republic, parliamentary institutions worked poorly, and political and economic power remained concentrated. Corruption and economic mismanagement were widespread. The Republican leadership took Portugal into World War I with significant expenditure and loss of life. A military coup d'état ended the First Republic in 1926. This was the beginning of a dictatorship that evolved into the Estado Novo regime.

In the early 1960s, independence movements in the Portuguese overseas provinces of Angola, Mozambique and Guinea in Africa, resulted in the Portuguese Colonial War (1961–1974). Throughout the colonial war period Portugal had to deal with increasing dissent, arms embargoes and other punitive sanctions imposed by most of the international community.

In April 1974, a bloodless left-wing military coup in Lisbon, known as the Carnation Revolution, would lead the way for a modern democracy as well as the independence of the last colonies in Africa, after two years of a transitional period known as PREC, characterized by social turmoil and power disputes between left- and right-wing political forces. These events left Portugal on the brink of a civil war and made it a fertile ground for radicalism. Some factions, including Álvaro Cunhal's PCP, unsuccessfully tried to turn the country toward communism. The retreat from the colonies and the acceptance of its independence terms which would create newly independent communist states in 1975 (most notably the People's Republic of Angola and the People's Republic of Mozambique) prompted a mass exodus of Portuguese citizens from Portugal's African territories (mostly from Portuguese Angola and Mozambique), creating over a million destitute Portuguese refugees — the retornados. The country continued to be governed by a military-civilian provisional administration until the Portuguese legislative election of 1976.

== See also ==
- Processo Revolucionário Em Curso governing bodies
