= Workers' Revolutionary Party (Portugal) =

Defunct Trotskyist party in Portugal

Workers Revolutionary Party Partido Revolucionário dos Trabalhadores
- Secretary-General: Antônio Maria de Sá Leal
- Founded: 31 January 1975
- Merged into: Revolutionary Socialist Party
- Headquarters: Lisbon
- Newspaper: Combate Socialista (Socialist Combat)
- Ideology: Marxism; Trotskyism
- Political position: Far-left
- Colors: Maroon (Grená)

Election symbol

The Workers Revolutionary Party (Portuguese: Partido Revolucionário dos Trabalhadores, PRT) was a far-left political party in Portugal. It was created on 31 January 1975 and formally registered with the Supreme Court of Justice on 25 March 1975. It followed the Argentine revolutionary Nahuel Moreno's form of Trotskyism, and was in sympathy with, but not formally affiliated to, the reunified Fourth International. The party's stated objective was to organise and lead the working class towards the seizure of power and a socialist revolution, with the ultimate aim of abolishing capitalism and progressively eliminating social classes. The party published the newspaper Combate Socialista (Socialist Combat).

The PRT emerged during the period of intense political radicalisation following the Carnation Revolution. Contemporary accounts identify it as one of several revolutionary left-wing organisations active during 1974–1975, alongside groups such as the Revolutionary Party of the Proletariat and Internationalist Communist League, contributing to the broader shift towards revolutionary socialism in Portugal.

== Party structure ==
According to the party's constitution of 25 March 1975, the PRT was structured as follows, from highest to lowest authority:

- Congresso Nacional (National Congress) – the supreme decision-making body of the party.
- Comité Central (Central Committee) and Comissão de Controlo e das Medidas Disciplinares (Control and Disciplinary Measures Commission) – both subordinate to the National Congress; the Central Committee directed the party between congresses, while the Commission oversaw internal discipline.
- Comité Executivo (Executive Committee) – subordinate to the Central Committee, responsible for day-to-day leadership.
- Célula (Cell) – the base-level unit of party organisation.

== 1976 presidential election ==
In May 1976, the PRT and the Internationalist Communist League (LCI) jointly presented Arlete Vieira da Silva as their candidate for the presidential election of 1976. She would have been the first woman to stand for the Portuguese presidency. At the press conference announcing the candidacy, the PRT was represented by its leader (dirigente) António Sá Leal, while the LCI was represented by João Cabral Fernandes and José Ferreira Fernandes. Speaking to the Diário de Notícias on 10 May 1976, Sá Leal declared that the bourgeoisie had already chosen its presidential candidate, singling out the PPD as having given the signal. The candidacy attracted significant press coverage but ultimately collapsed before the election took place.

== Electoral history ==
In the 1976 legislative election it stood in four constituencies: Coimbra, Lisbon, Porto and Setúbal, receiving a total of 5,171 votes (0.09%). In the 1976 local elections it contested in Oeiras, obtaining 282 votes (0.23%).

== Merger ==
In 1979 the PRT merged with the Internationalist Communist League (LCI) to form the Revolutionary Socialist Party (PSR); the merger was approved by order of the Supreme Court of Justice dated 2 April 1979. The PSR eventually became part of the Left Bloc.
