= Coup of 25 November 1975 =

Failed Portuguese far-left military coup

Date	25 November 1975
Location	Portugal
Result	Coup failure

Belligerents
(Portugal) Group of Nine (Portugal) Council of the Revolution	(Portugal) Far-left coup plotters (Portugal) Parachute Troops School

Commanders and leaders
(Portugal) Ramalho Eanes (Portugal) Mário Soares (Portugal) António Pires Veloso	unknown

The Coup of 25 November 1975 (usually referred to as the 25 de Novembro in Portugal) was a failed military coup d'état against the post-Carnation Revolution governing bodies of Portugal. It is a quite controversial topic in political discussions that pin the right and left-wing sides of the political spectrum. By the right, the attempt is believed to have been carried out by Portuguese far-left activists, on a supposed attempt to hijack the Portuguese transition to democracy in favor of a communist state. Right-wing parties often call for the celebration of the date, believing it deserves the same importance as the Portuguese Liberty Day (April 25th, the date of the Carnation Revolution that brought down Estado Novo). Left-wing parties do not subscribe or recognize this view of the same events.

== Events ==
The political, economic, and social crisis in post-Carnation Revolution Portugal, a period known as PREC, and the make-up of The Constituent Assembly, the first democratically elected organ after the fall of the previous regime, gave rise to serious confrontations during what became known as the Hot Summer of 1975. This caused a division in the Armed Forces Movement which had been responsible for the overthrowing of the Estado Novo regime. It was the coup on 25 November 1975, followed by a counter-coup led by Ramalho Eanes, a pro-democracy moderate (and supported by moderate socialist Mário Soares), that re-established the democratic process.

=== 25 of November ===
On this day, dissident paratroopers tried to seize military complexes across the country, in a coup attempt that was easily defeated by commandos loyal to the government. With the country engulfed in political chaos, some hundreds of military personnel sympathetic to the extreme left seized the Monsanto Air Base, the Air Force School, and five other air bases in the capital and in the south of Portugal.

== Historical views of the date ==
Many authors and historians have published works surrounding the date and its events. Authors Adriano Zilhão and Raquel Varela published, in 2025, "Do 25 de Novembro aos Nossos Dias" (translation: "From November 25th to our days"), where they argue and support that the coup d'état was only a battle between the far-right and right supporters, as well as the Portuguese Socialist Party and the Portuguese Communist Party. The authors establish a timeline that shows the coup was planned right from the Summer of 1975, right after the Carnation Revolution, and was deliberately planned to appear to be a leftist machination.

In April 25th of 1974, the Carnation Revolution led by organized military forces originated what Varela and Paço call an unintended revolution led by workers, which was classically socialist. Right then, the State is Bourgeois in nature, detaining all properties and power over the Portuguese people; as they are faced with the threat of the revolution, they start organizing a counter-revolution, which is seen through the failed attempts made in September 28th 1974, and also March 11th 1975. Their sights were set on putting a stop of the coordinating of worker's commissions, settlers, and soldiers throughout Portugal. As the conflict kept going, it was impossible for one side to not reign supreme, while the revolution had made it impossible for a nationalist government to settle (as Estado Novo was decidedly nationalist). The attempted coup was then made by a part of the MFA (which included the Group of the Nine and other sectors positioned to its right on the political spectrum), but with the support of the Socialist Party, the Church, the right-wing parties, and the embassies of the great powers of the time.

== See also ==
- Carnation Revolution
- Portuguese transition to democracy
- Third Portuguese Republic
- 1981 Spanish coup attempt
