= Octávio Pato =

Portuguese communist leader

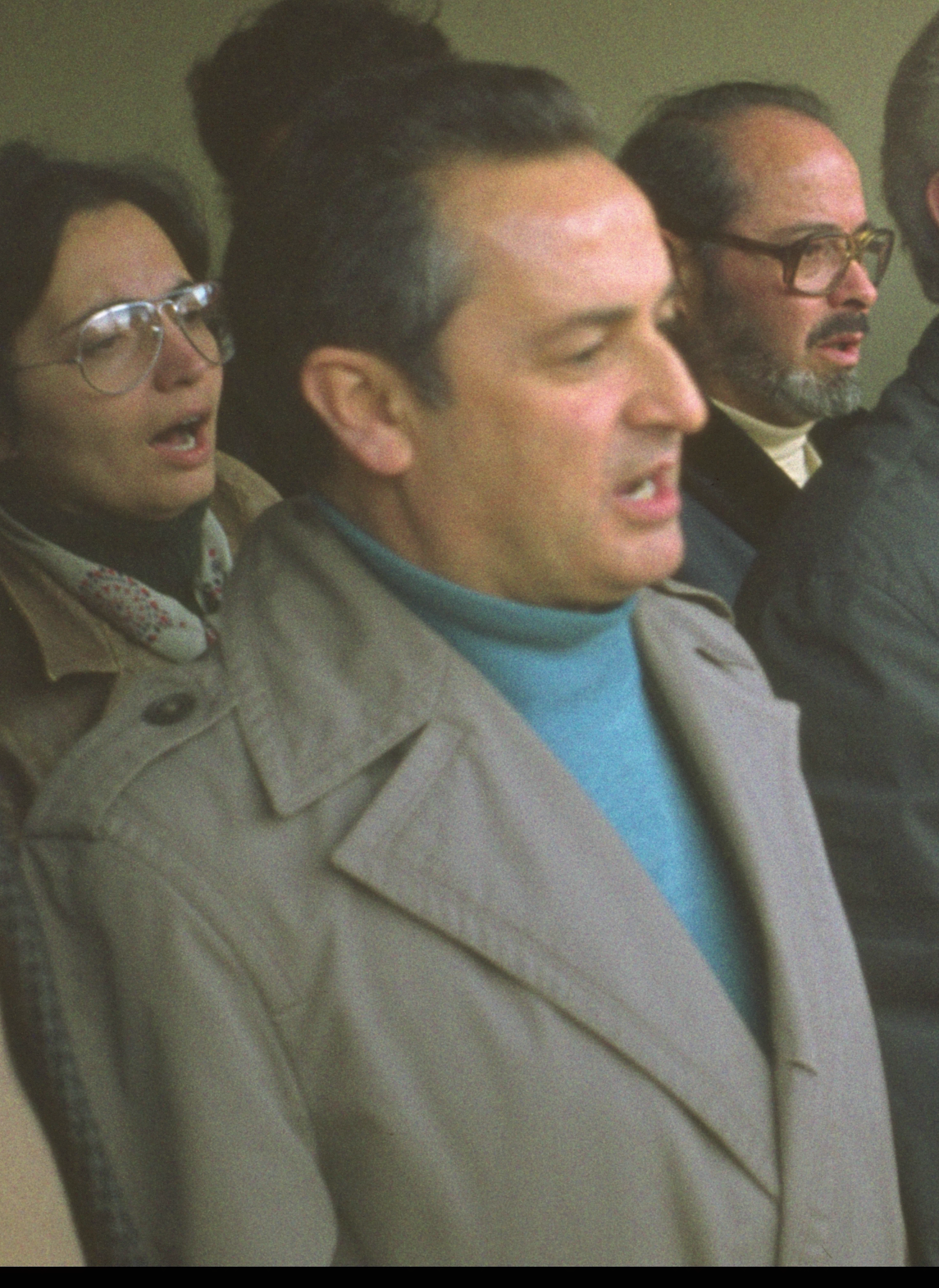
- Octávio Pato in 1976

Parliamentary leader of the Portuguese Communist Party
- In office 2 June 1975 – 3 June 1976
- Preceded by: Party Legalized
- Succeeded by: Carlos Brito

Personal details
- Born: April 1, 1925 Vila Franca de Xira
- Died: February 19, 1999 (aged 73) Coimbra, Portugal

Octávio Floriano Rodrigues Pato (1 April 1925, Vila Franca de Xira – 19 February 1999) was a Portuguese communist leader.

== Biography ==
Octávio Pato started working at 14 in a shoe factory. At the same time he also played soccer for Sport Lisboa e Benfica's youth team (and remained an unconditional Benfica supporter throughout his life). Due to his restlessness as well as identifying with the working class, he soon made contact with a group of "neo-realismo" intellectuals and artists (the Portuguese version of socialist realism), such as Soeiro Pereira Gomes and Alves Redol who developed their political work in his home town, Vila Franca de Xira. After that contact, he joined the Communist Youth Federation at the age of 15 and soon began his career as a revolutionary. Still a teenager, he was an active voice in organising the wave of strikes that shook the Portuguese Estado Novo regime, led by Oliveira Salazar, in 1944. His brother Carlos died in prison, along with Alfredo Dinis (Alex) and some other senior members of the Communist Party at the time.

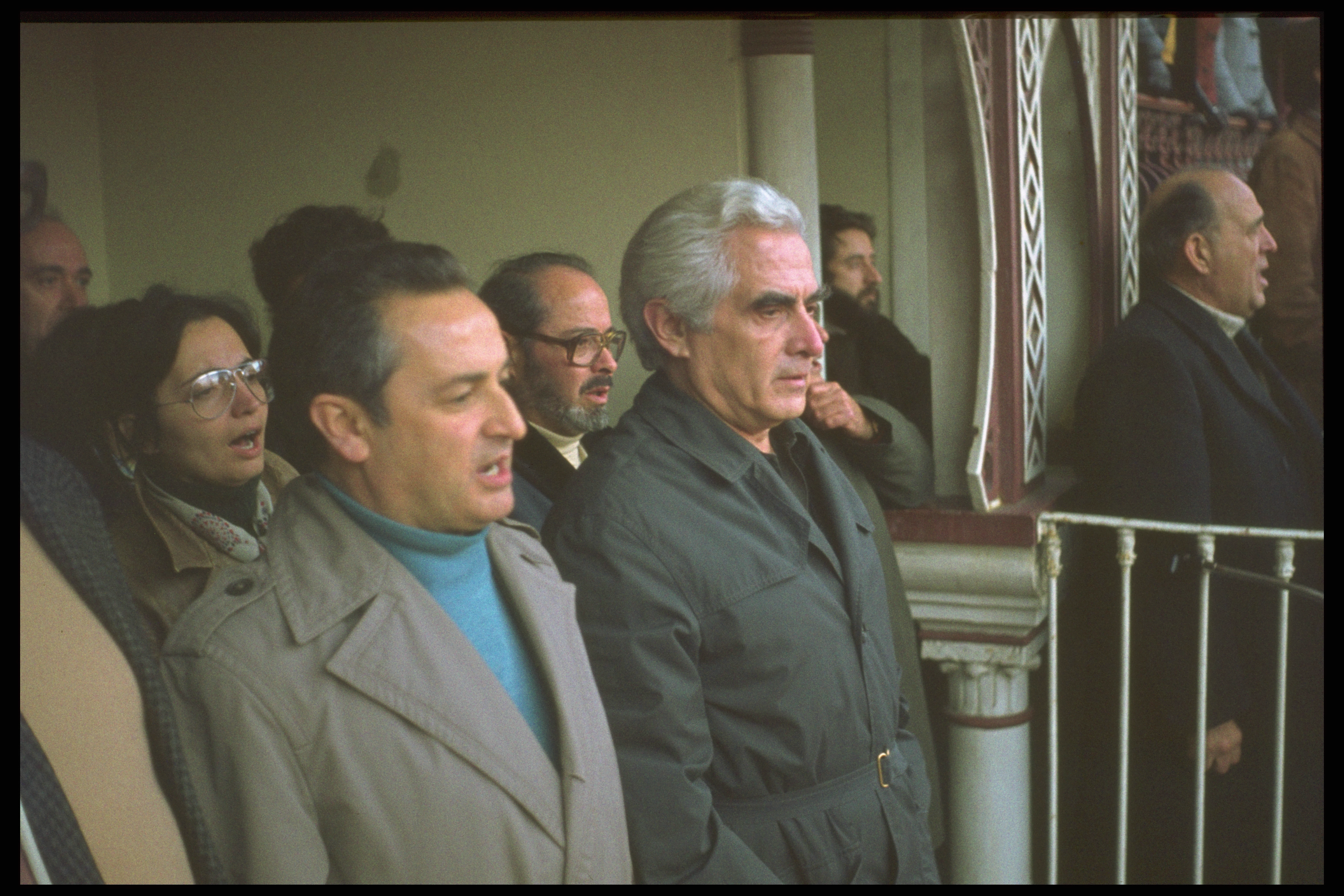
1976 - Alvaro Cunhal, General Secretary of the Portuguese Communist Party's & Octavio Pato, Party's presidential candidate, at Campo Pequeno, Lisboa

In 1945 he went into hiding, controlling and organising the youth and student branches of the Party. In 1947 he became responsible for organising the Lisbon Region and for the party newspaper, Avante!, and the clandestine typographies where the newspaper was printed. He also joined the party's Central Committee.

He was soon caught by the anti-communist political police, PIDE, being arrested in 1961. He was beaten and tortured. He endured 11 and then a further seven days of sleep deprivation (a common torture method used by the police), lost consciousness and had a near-death experience. Was kept in solitary confinement for four months. During this time he didn't speak a word to his captors.

Taken to court, Pato was defended by his long-time friend, the social-democrat Mário Soares (who would become the leader of the Socialist Party and President of Portugal). Pato made a very famous speech in his defence. He said he was proud to belong to the PCP and restated his belief in Marxism-Leninism. He reminded the judges of his imprisoned wife and sons and of his murdered comrades. He also claimed that his trial was betrayal of the Universal Declaration of Human Rights. He accused the regime of being an executive serving vested monopolies and landowners and criticised the country's membership of NATO. At one point during his trial, police officers beat him with truncheons whilst he was on the stand, in front of the judges. Soares yelled in protest at the bench, but to no avail. Pato was evacuated from the court and his sentence was read to him in his cell: eight years imprisonment that could be extended (fascist political sentences were open-ended).

Pato was released from prison in 1970 and went into hiding once again in 1972. At the time of the Carnation Revolution, he was one of the most important figures within the Party, being responsible by almost all the work inside Portugal as the Party's General Secretary, Álvaro Cunhal was in exile in the Soviet Union.

Later, in 1976, Octávio Pato was the Party's presidential candidate. During the following years he continued to be a member of the Party's Central Committee.

Pato was married four times and fathered five children.

Octávio Pato died in 1999, after a long struggle against cancer. He was buried at the cemetery of Alto de São João, in Lisbon, in one of the few perpetual graves.
