= Salgueiro Maia =

Portuguese military officer (1944–1992)

Fernando José Salgueiro Maia
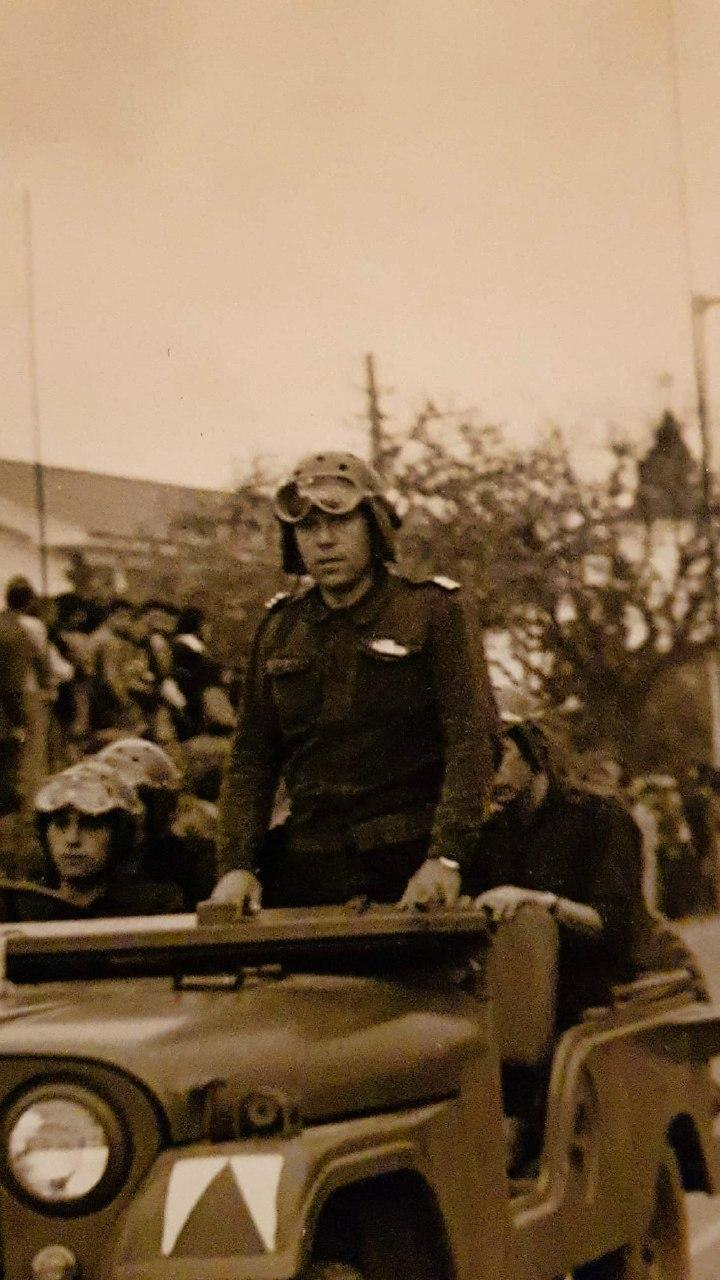
- Capitão Salgueiro Maia
- Born: 1 July 1944; Castelo de Vide, Portugal
- Died: 4 April 1992 (aged 47); Lisbon, Portugal
- Military career
- Allegiance: Portugal
- Branch: Portuguese Army
- Service years: 1964–1988
- Rank: Captain; Major (from 1981)
- Known for: Carnation Revolution
- Conflicts: Portuguese Colonial War; Mozambican War of Independence
- Awards: Grand Cross of the Order of Liberty; Grand Officer of the Military Order of the Tower and of the Sword, of Valour, Loyalty and Merit; Gold Medal of the city of Santarém; Grand Cross of the Order of Prince Henry

Fernando José Salgueiro Maia, GOTE, GCIH, GCL (1 July 1944 – 4 April 1992), commonly known as Salgueiro Maia (Portuguese pronunciation: [salˈɣɐjɾu ˈmajɐ]), was a Portuguese military officer and prominent figure in the Carnation Revolution, which resulted in the fall of the ruling dictatorship in Portugal.

== Early life ==
Maia was born in 1944 in Castelo de Vide, Portugal, the son of Francisco da Luz Maia, a railway worker, and Francisca Silvéria Salgueiro. He attended primary school in São Torcato, Coruche, and later moved to Tomar where he studied at Colégio Nun'Álvares, but finished his secondary school education in the National Liceu of Leiria. Maia graduated in Social and Political Sciences and Ethnological and Anthropological Sciences.

== Carnation Revolution ==
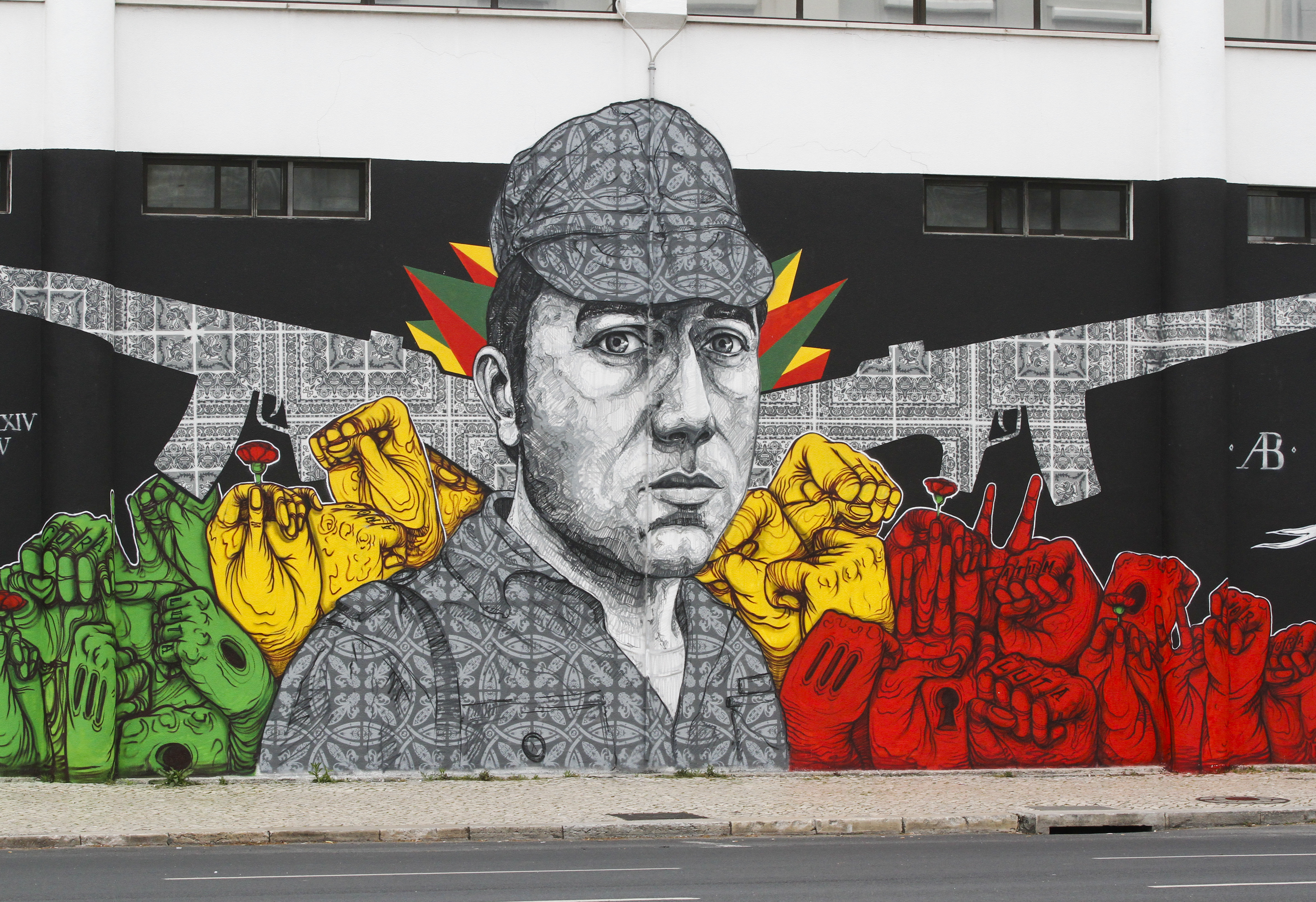
Graffiti of the icon of the 1974 Carnation Revolution in Portugal, Fernando José Salgueiro Maia, on a Lisbon wall to commemorate upcoming 40th anniversary of this event.

In 1974, Salgueiro Maia was one of the captains of the Portuguese Army who led the revolutionary forces during the Carnation Revolution. As a young captain stationed at Santarém, who drilled officers-in-training and sergeants-in-training, he was informed about the plans of the Movement of the Armed Forces (MFA) to bring down the dictatorship.

Maia's mission was to take and hold "Vienna", the government quarter in the centre of Lisbon. In the early hours of 25 April, having taken control of the base and holding senior officers who supported the regime at gunpoint, he assembled his troops and asked for their support in a short and famous speech:

Gentlemen, as you all know, there are three kinds of states: capitalist states, socialist states, and the state we've come to. Now, in this solemn night, we are going to end this state! To anyone who wants to come with me, we'll go to Lisbon and we'll finish this. This is voluntary. Who does not want to leave, stay here!

All his troops volunteered, and they left in military convoy for Lisbon about 60 km away, arriving at the government quarter at about 6am. The regime quickly tried to mobilise pro-government forces to defend them, but Maia persuaded them to join the revolution. A further attempt to place the revolutionary forces under naval bombardment was defeated after an onboard mutiny (and a threat to use artillery against the ship). Ministers fled the government quarters and retired to a barracks, where Maia's forces surrounded them and opened fire to show they were serious about their mission. Maia eventually arranged for the Prime Minister to surrender to General Spínola, and led the imprisoned former government away to chants of "Vitória!" from assembled crowds.

Salgueiro Maia and his troops had forced the ruling dictatorship to resign peacefully, without bloodshed. During the Revolution, the only four killings were carried out by PIDE, the regime's security agency, when civilians were demonstrating in front of its headquarters in Lisbon.

Red carnations became the symbol of the peaceful revolution when some of Maia's soldiers and civilians asked a nearby flower seller for some flowers to put in the muzzles of their guns and tanks, as a sign that there would be no bloodshed.

== After the Revolution ==
Salgueiro Maia did not seek any position of political power after the Revolution. He became a major in 1981.

He later adopted two children. In 1989 he was diagnosed with cancer and died three years later on 4 April 1992, at the age of 47.

In the 2000 film Capitães de Abril about the Carnation Revolution, the character of Salgueiro Maia was played by the Italian actor Stefano Accorsi.

== Awards and decorations ==
In 1983 he received the Grand Cross of the Order of Liberty; in 1992, posthumously, the degree of Grand Officer of the Military Order of the Tower and of the Sword, of Valour, Loyalty and Merit; in 2007, the Gold Medal of the city of Santarém; and in 2016, the Grand Cross of the Order of Prince Henry.
