= Revolutionary Council (Portugal) =

1975 armed forces movement council

The Revolutionary Council (Conselho da Revolução) of Portugal, was created on 14 March 1975 by the Assembly of the Armed Forces Movement (Assembleia do Movimento das Forças Armadas) with the goal of achieving the objectives of that movement's program as fast as possible and to provide the Portuguese people the security, the confidence, and social peace necessary achieve those governmental reforms. It was disbanded on 30 September 1982 by the first revision to the 1976 Constitution and replaced with the Constitutional Court and advisory Council of State.

== Composition ==
The Revolutionary Council was composed of the following positions:

- President of the Portuguese Republic
- Chief and Deputy Chief of the Armed Forces General Staff
- Chiefs of Staff of the Army, Navy and Air Force
- 14 officers selected by the three branches of the Portuguese Armed Forces
- Prime Minister of Portugal (only if a military officer)
