= Armed Forces Movement =

1974 Portuguese military faction that overthrew the government

- Movimento das Forças Armadas
- Emblem of the MFA as used in government propaganda during the Provisory Governments and the PREC.
- Leader: Otelo Saraiva de Carvalho
- Dates active: 1974
- Active regions: Portugal
- Ideology: Anti-fascism; Communism; Socialism
- Political position: Left-wing to far-left

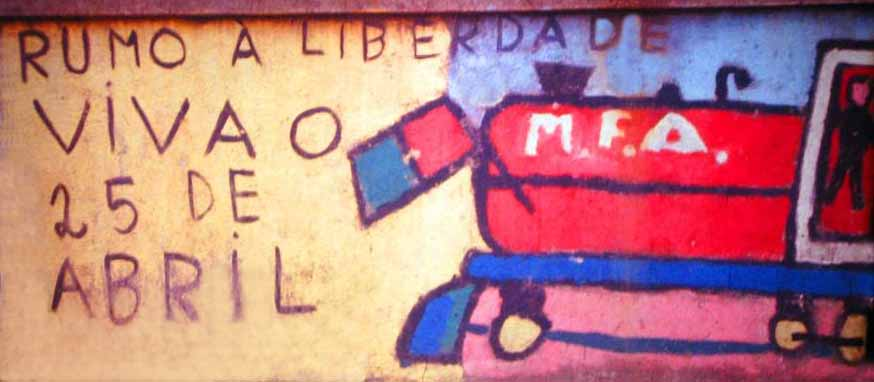
A mural dedicated to the MFA, it reads: "Towards freedom. Long live the 25th of April!"

The Armed Forces Movement (Portuguese: Movimento das Forças Armadas; MFA) was an organization of lower-ranking officers in the Portuguese Armed Forces that overthrew the Estado Novo dictatorship on 25 April 1974, an event known as the Carnation Revolution. This ended the Portuguese Colonial War in Angola, Mozambique, and Guinea-Bissau, leading to the independence of those countries and Portugal's other overseas territories of Cape Verde, São Tomé and Príncipe and East Timor. The MFA instituted the National Salvation Junta as the provisional government from April 25 1974 to March 14 1975, when it was replaced by the Revolutionary Council. (Note: The Revolutionary Council continued to exist, albeit with reduced powers, until 1982, after the establishment of the Third Portuguese Republic.) A new constitution was adopted in April 1976.

== Causes of the revolutionary coup ==
The military-led coup can be described as the necessary means of bringing back democracy to Portugal, ending the unpopular Colonial War where thousands of Portuguese soldiers had been commissioned into military service, and replacing the authoritarian Estado Novo (New State) dictatorship and its secret police which repressed civil liberties and human rights. In addition, academics have published works theorizing that the efforts made by the MFA were not in the strict interest of the people of Portugal or its overseas provinces, since the movement was initiated not as an attempt to liberate Portugal from the Estado Novo, but as an attempt of rebellion against the new military laws that were to be presented the next year (Decretos-Leis n.os 353, de 13 de Julho de 1973, e 409, de 20 de Agosto). The revolution and the whole movement were a way to work against laws that would reduce military costs and would reformulate the whole Portuguese military. Younger military academy graduates resented a program introduced by Marcello Caetano whereby militia officers who completed a brief training program and had served in the overseas territories' defensive campaigns, could be commissioned at the same rank as military academy graduates. Caetano's Portuguese Government had begun the program (which included several other reforms) on the advice of the Rhodesian Government, in order to increase the number of officials employed against the African insurgencies, and at the same time cut down military costs to alleviate an already overburdened government budget.

== Events ==
The MFA developed in the early 1970s as a movement of captains (movimento dos capitães), young officers who had been involved in the Colonial War against the separatist movements in the African overseas provinces of Angola, Mozambique, and Portuguese Guinea. What motivated the "captains" was, essentially, a desire for back wages and the freedom until then denied to the Portuguese people and the dissatisfaction with the policies followed by the government in relation to the Colonial War and military law. The principal aims of the MFA were the immediate completion of the Portuguese Colonial War, retreat from Portuguese Africa, establish free elections and the abolition of the secret police, the PIDE/DGS. The revolution was planned by Vasco Lourenço, Vasco Gonçalves and Otelo Saraiva de Carvalho the chief strategist who directed operations. Salgueiro Maia commanded the troops deployed from the School of Cavalry at Santarém. Some of the officers had leftist sympathies and connections to the Portuguese Communist Party. After a failed initial attempt in March 1974 the coup took place on the morning of 25 April. Within a few hours Lisbon was completely occupied by troops loyal to the MFA. Prime Minister Marcello Caetano handed over power to General António de Spínola. As a consequence of 25 April 1974 the MFA mobilised the army and announced the three 'Ds: democratisation, decolonisation and development.

His appeals to the maioria silenciosa ("silent majority"), to resist the accelerating swing to the left after the failed coup of 28 September 1974, and his tentative involvement in the rightist counter-revolution on 11 March 1975 (wherein he fled to Brazil) were clear examples that Spínola had changed his allegiances. Between 1976 and 1980, he presided over the Exército de Libertação de Portugal (ELP), the Liberation Army of Portugal, a paramilitary terrorist group of the extreme-right based in Brazil. As the author Günter Wallraff wrote in his book Aufdeckung einer Verschwörung – die Spínola-Aktion, Spínola was always interested in returning to power and eliminating his political adversaries. During Spínola's exile to Brazil, he was approached by Wallraff who had infiltrated Spínola's group, pretending to be an arms dealer working for Franz-Josef Strauss, a conservative and leader of the Christian Social Union in Bavaria. Spínola's group was the MDLP – Movimento Democrático de Libertação de Portugal ("Democratic Movement for the Liberation of Portugal") an anti-communist network of terrorist bombers, responsible for the death of a priest, and whose operatives included Carlos Paixão, Alfredo Vitorino, Valter dos Santos and Alcides Pereira. As their leader, Spínola had met with Wallraff to negotiate the purchase of arms and had supporters in the Alentejo who awaited the word to regain power (which Wallraff submitted as proof in order to detain Spínola by Swiss authorities). But there was never enough proof at that time to charge him or his conspirators in court.

== Transition to democracy ==
The systematic demolition of the old order was inaugurated by the MFA-led Junta de Salvação Nacional. As the pro-communist inspiration of the Junta was becoming increasingly evident, and far-left factions were taking the leading edge of the revolution, the process was halted by the failed coup of 25 November 1975. This period of social and political unrest which ensued after the 25 April military coup, is known as PREC (Processo Revolucionário Em Curso), where leftist and rightist factions struggled for supremacy within the Portuguese society and political institutions. The moderates eventually won and this prevented post-revolutionary Portugal from becoming a left or right wing-ruled regime, being governed by centrist leaders.

Finally, the Portuguese legislative election, 1976 took place on 25 April, exactly one year after the previous election, and two years after the Carnation Revolution. These elections could be said to be the definitive end of a period of revolution. Moderate democratic parties received most of the vote, and the Army handed power to a Socialist cabinet on 23 July 1976. However, the constitution pledged the country to realize socialism. Furthermore, the constitution declared the extensive nationalizations and land seizures of 1975 irreversible (many would be ruled illegal some years later). The military supported these commitments through a pact with the main political parties that guaranteed its guardian rights over the new democracy for four more years.
