= Maria Belo =

Portuguese psychoanalyst and former Member of the European Parliament

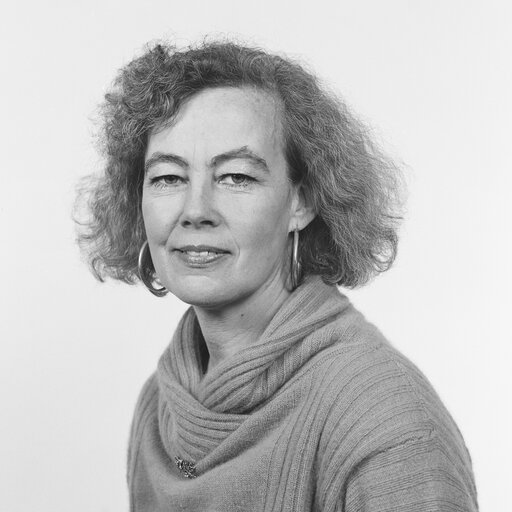

Member of the European Parliament
- In office 1988–1994
- Parliamentary group: Socialist

Personal details
- Born: 27 April 1938 (age 88) Lisbon, Portugal
- Party: Portuguese: Socialist Party (PS)
- Children: One son
- Education: Catholic University of Leuven
- Occupation: Psychoanalyst

Maria Belo is a Portuguese psychoanalyst who can be considered a pioneer in the use of psychoanalysis in Portugal. She was a Member of the European Parliament (MEP) in its second and third terms, between 1988 and 1994, and was active in efforts to decriminalize abortion in Portugal in the 1980s.

== Early life ==
Maria Belo was born on 27 April 1938 in Lisbon, capital of Portugal. One of nine children, she came from a conservative Catholic family that supported the prevailing Estado Novo dictatorship under the leadership of António de Oliveira Salazar. In adolescence she considered becoming a nun. After completing high school in Lisbon, she trained to be a kindergarten teacher and taught for a year. Then, in 1959, Belo obtained a scholarship to study psychology in Belgium at the Catholic University of Leuven, (which, from 1968 became two separate universities, the Katholieke Universiteit Leuven and the Université catholique de Louvain). At the end of her third year, she had to decide on a thesis topic and chose to do research in Angola, at that time a Portuguese colony. Her plan was to take six months to research children in Angolan tribes but she ended up staying a year, doing teaching in order to fund herself.

Having completed her degree she concluded that she was not yet ready to return to Portugal to be a psychologist and stayed at the university in Leuven as an assistant in psychology. At this time, she gradually moved away from social relations with the Belgian students and became more friendly with those with left-wing politics from Latin countries, such as Spain, Italy and South American countries. She is quoted as saying that her first boyfriend was a Spanish communist, while the second was a Maoist guerrilla. At this stage, she also lost her religious faith. In 1968, she went to Paris to study psychoanalysis, where she stayed until 1974, when she returned to Portugal. Among those that she worked with in Paris was Jacques Lacan.

In Portugal, Belo did a PhD at the Faculty of Social and Human Sciences of the NOVA University Lisbon, presenting a thesis on "Portuguese Culture and Psychoanalysis", advancing the concept of the "absent father" syndrome. Soon after, she became a Freemason, as part of the Women's Grand Lodge Of France. She went on to be the founder of the first women's lodge of Portugal in 1996 and was elected Grand Master of the Women's Grand Lodge of Portugal in 2004.

== Political life ==
Belo became a member of the Portuguese Socialist Party (PS) in 1979. In 1983, her proposal to decriminalize abortion was approved at the annual PS Congress. In the following year it was approved in the Assembly of the Republic of Portugal, although only in cases where there was a danger to the life of the mother, malformation of the fetus, or in cases of rape. Representing the PS, she was a Member of the European Parliament during its second and third terms, as part of the Socialist Group, joining the parliament as a replacement in 1988 and being elected on the PS list in the 1989 election. Between 1989 and 1994, she was vice-chair of the Committee on Development and Cooperation and between 1989 and 1992 a member of the Committee on Women's rights.

== Other activities ==
Belo continues to practise as a psychoanalyst and to take part in conferences. She was a co-founder of Centro Português de Psicanálise - Associação Lacaniana Internacional. She is also involved with several NGOs, including those relating to women's rights. She was a co-founder of the Associação para a Cooperação Entre os Povos (Association for Cooperation Among Peoples – ACEP), which aims to contribute to a more equitable world through cooperation between people, particularly those in Portuguese-speaking countries. Belo occasionally contributes to newspapers such as Público.

== Personal life ==
Belo never married. She adopted a son in 1974. She had a close relationship for some years with the Portuguese writer and revolutionary, Nuno Bragança. For a time after her return to Portugal, she worked with Isabel do Carmo and Carlos Antunes who had set up the Brigadas Revolucionárias, which supported armed insurrection, and with which Bragança was also involved.
