= Artur Albarran =

Portuguese journalist and entrepreneur (1953–2022)

- Born: Artur Manuel de Oliveira Rodrigues Albarran; 16 January 1953; Island of Mozambique, Nampula Province, Mozambique
- Died: 15 February 2022 (aged 69); Lisbon, Portugal
- Citizenship: Portugal
- Occupations: Journalist and Business Executive

Artur Manuel de Oliveira Rodrigues Albarran (16 January 1953 – 15 February 2022) was a Portuguese journalist and entrepreneur.

== Life and career ==
Artur Albarran was born in the Island of Mozambique, localized in the north of Mozambique, on 16 January 1953. His father ran a business in this country for harvesting and processing exotic woods. At the age of 18, Artur Albarran begins to settle in Portugal. He started his professional career at Rádio Clube Português then, working with other broadcasters including Cândido Mota, José Nuno Martins, Joaquim Furtado, Jaime Fernandes and Júlio Isidro.

After 25 April 1974, he became an extreme left activist, in the ideological area of the Partido Revolucionário do Proletariado, the organization founded by Carlos Antunes and Isabel do Carmo, in 1973, by dissent with the Partido Comunista Português. The experience would lead to him being charged in the criminal trials of the Revolutionary Brigades. He then fled to France, being tried in absentia, but ultimately acquitted.

From France he went to England, where he worked at the BBC, also starting a collaboration on the ITV's World in Action reporting program. He travelled to the United States and Brazil, returning to Portugal in 1980.

At the state broadcaster Rádio e Televisão de Portugal (RTP), he was part of the founding team of Grande Reportagem and was a war correspondent during the Gulf War in early 1991. As a war reporter, he followed the conflict in Somalia in 1992, when American forces entered that country, to try to end the civil war. He also became head of the editorial staff of RTP1 and RTP2. In 1988 he launched the newspaper O Século Ilustrado, of which he became director.

With the advent of private television, Albarran moved to TVI in 1993 as an information presenter. In 1996, he abandoned news when he accepted an invitation from SIC to be a presenter for entertainment programs such as "The Chair of Power", "Real Images" and "Chained" (in 2001).

In 1997, he was invited by a group of North American businessmen and politicians to be the CEO of EuroAmer, a real estate holding company in Portugal. The head of these politicians and businessmen was Frank Carlucci, former Secretary of Defence of the United States, CIA director and former ambassador to Portugal after 25 April.

In 2005, after EuroAmer went out of business, Albarran was the target of an investigation by the Portuguese Public Prosecutor, suspected of money laundering and falsification of documents. He was presented to a judge by the Judiciary Police on suspicion of economic crimes and money laundering, but he was never indicted. After being presented to a judge, Albarran was released on his own recognizance, with only the obligation of providing his identity and residence address. After seven years, the case was dismissed.

Later Albarran divided his time between Ras Al Khaima in the United Arab Emirates, India, Angola and South Africa. Albarran left Portugal some time after triggering the investigation into company Euroamer SGPS, of which he was CEO under the chairmanship of Frank Carlucci.

== Personal life and death ==
He was married to Lisa Hardy, a German. They had two daughters together Linda Hardy Albarran and Linny Hardy Albarran. He later was in a relationship with a woman from Angola.

In 2011 he was diagnosed with leukemia. He underwent a bone marrow transplant. And in July 2012, when he had finished his treatment at the Portuguese Institute of Oncology, he publicly reappeared with his wife Sandra Nobre, apparently recovered. The cancer later recurred.

In August 2021 he was hospitalised with COVID-19. He died after a long battle with leukemia and post COVID-19 complications on 15 February 2022, at the age of 69.
