= FUP =

FUP or Fup may refer to:

- Fair usage policy
- Fair Use Project of Stanford Law School
- Federal Union Party, a political party in Myanmar
- Freshman Urban Program, at Northwestern University, Illinois, United States
- Força de Unidade Popular (Popular Unity Force), a Portuguese political party that existed in 1980–2004
- Fup, a duck, the protagonist of the 1983 novel Fup by Jim Dodge
