= Terrorism in Switzerland =

Terrorism in Switzerland has occurred periodically since the 1970s. Switzerland has experienced both domestic and international terrorism over the past several decades, though domestic terrorism was primarily low‐level violence.

== History ==
A number of left-wing terrorist cells were active in Switzerland in the 1970s. A group known as "Bändlistrasse" was active in Zurich in 1972. A group associated with Italian-German terrorist Petra Krause, was active around Zurich from 1971 to 1975. Members of the German group "Bewegung 2. Juni" (2 June Movement) were active in that period as well.

Armenian militants associated with Justice Commandos of the Armenian Genocide were also active in Switzerland, targeting Turkish diplomats. On May 28, 1976, in Zurich, two bombs caused extensive damage to the office of Garanti Bank and of Labor Attaché of Turkish embassy. On February 6, 1980, in Bern, Turkish Ambassador to Switzerland Doğan Türkmen was attacked. Türkmen escaped with minor wounds. Max Hraïr Kilndjian was sentenced as an accessory to two years imprisonment by the tribunal of Aix-en-Provence.

According to the Swiss Federal Prosecutor's office and media, in the 1990s and early 2000s Al Qaeda members had accounts at Swiss banks, including UBS.

In 2006, Swiss authorities showed greater awareness of the presence of terrorist groups operating in their country. The Swiss Federal Police described Switzerland as a “jihadi field of operations” in its 2005 terrorism report.

Since 2013, the Swiss Federal Intelligence Service (FIS) has warned of a heightened threat emanating from Islamic terrorism in Switzerland.

== Incidents ==
Notable incidents include the 1955 seizure of the Romanian embassy in Bern, El Al Flight 432 attack, and the bombing of Swissair Flight 330.

On 12 September 2020, a randomly-chosen man was fatally stabbed in Morges. The attacker was known to the Swiss intelligence service as an Islamist and under surveillance for possible links to terrorism.

On 24 November 2020, a 28-year-old Swiss woman attacked two female customers with a knife in a store in Lugano. The attacker stated that she had intended to behead the victims and that she acted in the name of ISIS. The Appeals Chamber classified the act as a terrorist attack.

On 3 March 2024, a 15-year-old stabbed and injured an Orthodox Jewish man in Zurich. He allegedly swore allegiance to Islamic State and called for a battle against the Jews.

On 28 May 2026, three people were injured in a mass stabbing at Winterthur railway station in Winterthur, Switzerland. The perpetrator was arrested and authorities declared the attack as an act of terrorism.

== Counterterrorism ==
In 1977, Petra Krause, an Italian-German woman, was extradited from Switzerland to Italy on allegations of supplying arms to outlawed terrorist organizations.

In 2015, Swiss police arrested two Syrians and found traces of bomb-making chemicals in a car. The arrested individuals were members of an Islamic State cell planning an attack using explosives and toxic gas.

Since the 2015 Paris attacks, Swiss and French officials say they have been working closely together. Geneva also has raised their alert level.

== See also ==
- Terrorism in Europe
- Crime in Switzerland
