= Isabel do Carmo =

Portuguese doctor and communist

- Born: Maria Isabel Augusta Cortes do Carmo; 12 September 1940 (age 85); Barreiro, Portugal
- Occupation: Endocrinologist
- Known for: Organising violent revolt against the Portuguese government in the mid-1970s
- Notable work: A Luta Armada
- Spouse: Carlos Antunes
- Children: 2

Isabel do Carmo ComL is a former founder and leader of the Portuguese activist organization, Brigadas Revolucionárias (BR), which took part in an armed struggle against the Portuguese government, both before and after the overthrow of the repressive Estado Novo regime. She was also the founder and leader of Partido Revolucionário do Proletariado (PRP), a political organization never formalized as a party and created to support the BR. She was held in pre-trial prison from 1978 to 1982. Carmo, a doctor and a University professor, has published extensively, on both medical and political issues.

== Early life ==
Maria Isabel Augusta Cortes do Carmo was born in Barreiro, on the left bank of the River Tagus to the southeast of the Portuguese capital of Lisbon, on 12 September 1940. She took the ferry to go to High School in Lisbon and later graduated from the Faculty of Medicine of the University of Lisbon. As a student and activist in the students' association of the Faculty of Medicine, she participated in student revolts in 1962, having been the first woman to speak at essentially male assemblies. After receiving a PhD from the same faculty, she practised medicine as an assistant physician at the Hospital de Santa Maria in the north of Lisbon.

== Political activity ==
Carmo's political activities began when she was 15, when she joined the youth organization of the Movement of Democratic Unity (MUD), a quasi-legal organization that opposed the Estado Novo. In 1958, she took part in the campaign of the communist, Arlindo Vicente, for the Presidency of the Republic. Vicente eventually withdrew in favour of Humberto Delgado. A year later she joined the Portuguese Communist Party (PCP), where she was, in secret, a member of the leadership of the university sector and of the communist organization of doctors.

In 1969 she became a member of the Portuguese Democratic Movement (MUD). This was a coalition of political parties formed to oppose the Estado Novo in the widely manipulated national and local elections. In the same year she went to Paris, where she lived between October 1969 and March 1970 together with Carlos Antunes. At this time, after the 1968 Warsaw Pact invasion of Czechoslovakia made her disenchanted with the Soviet Union, and becoming frustrated with the PCP's unwillingness to carry out armed activities, Carmo founded, with Carlos Antunes and Pedro Goulart, the Brigadas Revolucionárias/Revolutionary Brigades (BR). The PCP leader Álvaro Cunhal was also in Paris at this time. The first violent action by the BR took place on 7 November 1971 against the NATO facilities in Fonte da Telha, in Costa da Caparica.

She would live together with Antunes, who died from COVID-19 in January 2021. They had a son and a daughter. In 1970, she was excluded from her position as an assistant at the Faculty of Medicine of the University of Lisbon, by order of PIDE, Portugal's secret police. However, she continued to perform this position secretly and without remuneration, with the support of her professor – Galvão Telles. She was part of the executive of the Ordem dos Médicos (Order of Physicians) until 1972.

On December 31, 1972, the BR infiltrated the vigil of Capela do Rato, a protest organised by a group of Catholics who took a stand against the colonial war. The BR carried out a series of bombings in various locations in Lisbon. Two children decided to play with an object where a clock was visible, which eventually exploded in their hands. Their parents were humble workers. One child lost an eye and the other lost three fingers in the right hand. The father was a gardener and the mother was an illiterate maid. This outcome forced Isabel do Carmo to go underground so that she could keep on carrying out her revolutionary activities. The children and their parents never received any support or compensation from the BR.

In October 1973, again together with Antunes, she founded Partido Revolucionário do Proletariado/Revolutionary Party of the Proletariat (PRP). It was the BR's political arm. Despite its name, the PRP was not a legal party or an autonomous organization: all BR operatives were part of the PRP, but not all PRP militants were part of the BR. The PRP's main objective was to broaden the base of support and provide political protection for BR terrorist attacks. Unlike the BR, which, at first, still had some support among progressive Catholics, the PRP established its base among the more-radical far left whose ideology was Revolutionary Socialism.

After the Carnation Revolution of April 1974, which overthrew the Estado Novo, the PRP merged with BR, becoming a single entity — PRP/BR. This focused on political action, and, for many months, there were no bomb attacks or bank robberies. Later in 1975, during the so-called Hot Summer of political, social and military instability, the country was ruled by a communist government with the support of Operational Command of the Continent (COPCON), led by Otelo Saraiva de Carvalho. The PRP/BR aim was to have the extreme left play a dominant role in the Portuguese government. Meanwhile, Carmo edited PRP's newspaper Revolução (Revolution) until 1978.

During that period reinforced with the far-left coup of 11 March 1975, Carmo and Carlos Antunes were increasingly important in the radicalization process, becoming prominent figures in the Processo Revolucionário Em Curso (Ongoing Revolutionary Process – PREC). PRP/BR and Carmo were openly against free elections and neither she, PRP/BR, nor Antunes ran for elections. In March 1975, Carmo wrote a manifesto titled "No to elections, yes to the Socialist Revolution". At the same time she said to a weekly newspaper: "Never, anywhere in the world, has socialism been implemented through elections and we believe that through them, the bourgeoisie will never lose its privileges"

The PRP/BR argued in a manifesto that in order to strengthen the alliance between the people and the Armed Forces Movement, which had initiated the Carnation Revolution, it would be necessary to organize a huge revolutionary army to be formed by the military and members of grassroots organizations (workers, residents, farmers, etc.). The PRP/BR also established connections with other European terrorist organisations, such as the Spanish ETA and the Provisional Irish Republican Army.

In October 1975 a new law was approved forcing the disarmament of political movements and the BR, in a press conference, announced that they were not accepting the law and would go underground and keep their arms. The BR became frustrated with the end of the revolutionary period and with the beginning of the consolidation of democracy and the preparation for Portugal's entry into the European Economic Community (EEC), and carried out a series of attacks and bank robberies.

On 10 September 1975, Carmo and Antunes received, from a Copcon official, 1000 machine guns diverted from the General Deposit of War Material, situated near Loures, which were to be used to arm the BR as well as its supporters. Given the pressure exerted on public opinion, the Revolutionary Council demanded that Antunes and Carmo return the guns. They refused and decided that the BR should split from PRP and go underground to operate clandestinely and keep all weapons including the machine guns. Some BR weapons were later used by Forças Populares 25 de Abril.

Although the use of lethal violence by the BR was not their primary target, some deaths and injuries occurred as a result of confrontations with security forces. Between 1975 and 1979, at least 3 people were killed and several were wounded: a policeman, a Policia Judiciária officer and José Plácido, a former PRP/BR member who was killed because he was collaborating with the authorities. PRP/BR activities involved bank robberies (or similar activities) whose nickname was "fund recoveries" as well as placing and detonating explosives, mostly on governmental buildings. Regarding the policeman, Carmo claimed she was never accused of his death. Regarding José Placido, she stated that she was not aware of it and distanced herself from it.

Arrested in June 1978, and initially held in prison with her young son, Carmo was tried and sentenced twice in 1980 and 1982. The judge found that most of her crimes fell within the amnesty law approved by the parliament in1979. As a consequence, she was released in 1982. Antunes was released in the same year. She has always said that, apart from two of the members of PRP/BR who made a mistake when placing explosive devices and a passer-by who was accidentally killed by an explosion, no one died as a result of her activities. After Carmo`s imprisonment, many of the BR's members, led by Pedro Goulart, ended up joining Forças Populares 25 de Abril, the far-left terrorist group led by Otelo Saraiva de Carvalho who used lethal violence as a part of its intimidation strategy.

In 1978 the bombing of a freight train in Mauritania, which caused the death of eight soldiers, opened a series of internal discussions and disputes inside the Brigadas Revolucionárias. The attack was claimed by the Polisario Front but was organized by the Algerian Secret Services and carried out by BR militants. This was the first BR action intentionally meant to cause deaths. However, at that time most of the BR leaders, including Isabel do Carmo, were already in prison for bank robberies and denied knowledge of this action.

In 1989, she became active in the campaign to give an amnesty to Otelo Saraiva de Carvalho, who was accused of being a founder and co-leader of the Forças Populares 25 de Abril, a terrorist organization responsible for 19 assassinations. Previously he had been a member of the Movement of Armed Forces, which had initiated the Carnation Revolution and later he led the far-left attempted coup on 25 November 1975.

== Later life ==
Later, Carmo returned to work at the Hospital de Santa Maria, where she became director of the Endocrinology Service. She was also a professor at the Faculty of Medicine of the University of Lisbon. She was founder of the Portuguese Society of Endocrinology, of the Portuguese Society of Diabetology and founder of the Portuguese Society for the Study of Obesity. She coordinated a study on the prevalence of Anorexia nervosa. She has also worked at the Foundation for Science and Technology (Fundação para a Ciência e a Tecnologia), an organization that evaluates and funds research activities in the natural sciences. She also has a private medical practice. In December 2020, Carmo contracted COVID-19 at the same time as her late husband, but recovered.

== Awards and honours ==
- On 25 April 2004, on the occasion of the 30th Anniversary of the Carnation Revolution, Carmo was made a Commander of the Order of Liberty by President Jorge Sampaio.

== Publications ==
- Histórias que as Mulheres Contam – Testemunhos Reais (Stories Women Tell – Real Testimonials). 2015.
- A Luta Armada (Armed Struggle). 2018.
- As Vozes Insubmissas- A história das mulheres e dos homens que lutaram pela igualdade dos sexos quando era crime fazê-lo (The story of women and men who struggled for sexual equality when it was a crime to do so). 2004

Carmo's medical publications have largely been related to dietary matters:

- Saúde em Tempo de Risco, 1993
- Vida, Vírus e Vícios, 1994
- A Vida por um Fio – Anorexia Nervosa, 1994
- Magros, Gordinhos e Assim-Assim, 1997
- Doenças do Comportamento Alimentar, 2001
- Saber emagrecer, 2002
- Porque não Consigo Parar de Comer, 2003
- Alimentação saudável, alimentação segura (with Sara Rodi), 2002
- 222 Perguntas e Respostas para Emagrecer e Manter o Peso de uma Forma equilibrada, 2006
- Refeições, Marcas e Calorias, 2007
- Mulher 50 + 10 (co-author), 2007
- Os Alimentos, e Mitos que nos engordam, 2008
- Gorduchos e redondinhas (co-author), 2012
- Pensar perder o peso que pesa, 2013

== Sources ==
- Ângelo, Fernando Cavaleiro (2021). "A Atividade Terrorista e Subversiva das BR e FP25". DINFO : a queda do último serviço secreto militar (in Portuguese). Alfragide: Casa das Letras. ISBN 9789896608163.
- Araújo, António (2004). "A Paz é Possível: Algumas Notas Sobre o Caso da Capela do Rato" (PDF). Lusitania Sacra. 2nd Serie (16): 454–460.
- Castelo-Branco, Manuel (2022). "Brigadas Revolucionárias: Unir, Organizar, Armar, em nome da Revolução Socialista". Observador (in European Portuguese).
- Da Silva, R.; Ferreira, A. S. (2020). "From the armed struggle against the dictatorship to the socialist revolution: the narrative restraints to lethal violence among radical left organisations in Portugal". Perspectives on Terrorism (6). Institute of Security and Global Affairs (ISGA) of Leiden University’s: 139–151. ISSN 2334-3745.
  - Gobern Lopes, Luís (2022). "Iam preparados para disparar e matar? "Claro". As confissões de um ex-FP 25" (Both paper and eformat) (Interview) (in Portuguese). Interviewed by António José Vilela, Maria Henrique Espada. Revista Sábado.
- Schmid, Alex P. (1988). Political terrorism : a new guide to actors and authors, data bases, and literature (Expanded and updated ed.). New Brunswick, N.J.: Transaction Publishers. p. 654. ISBN 9781412815666.
