= Terrorism in Europe =

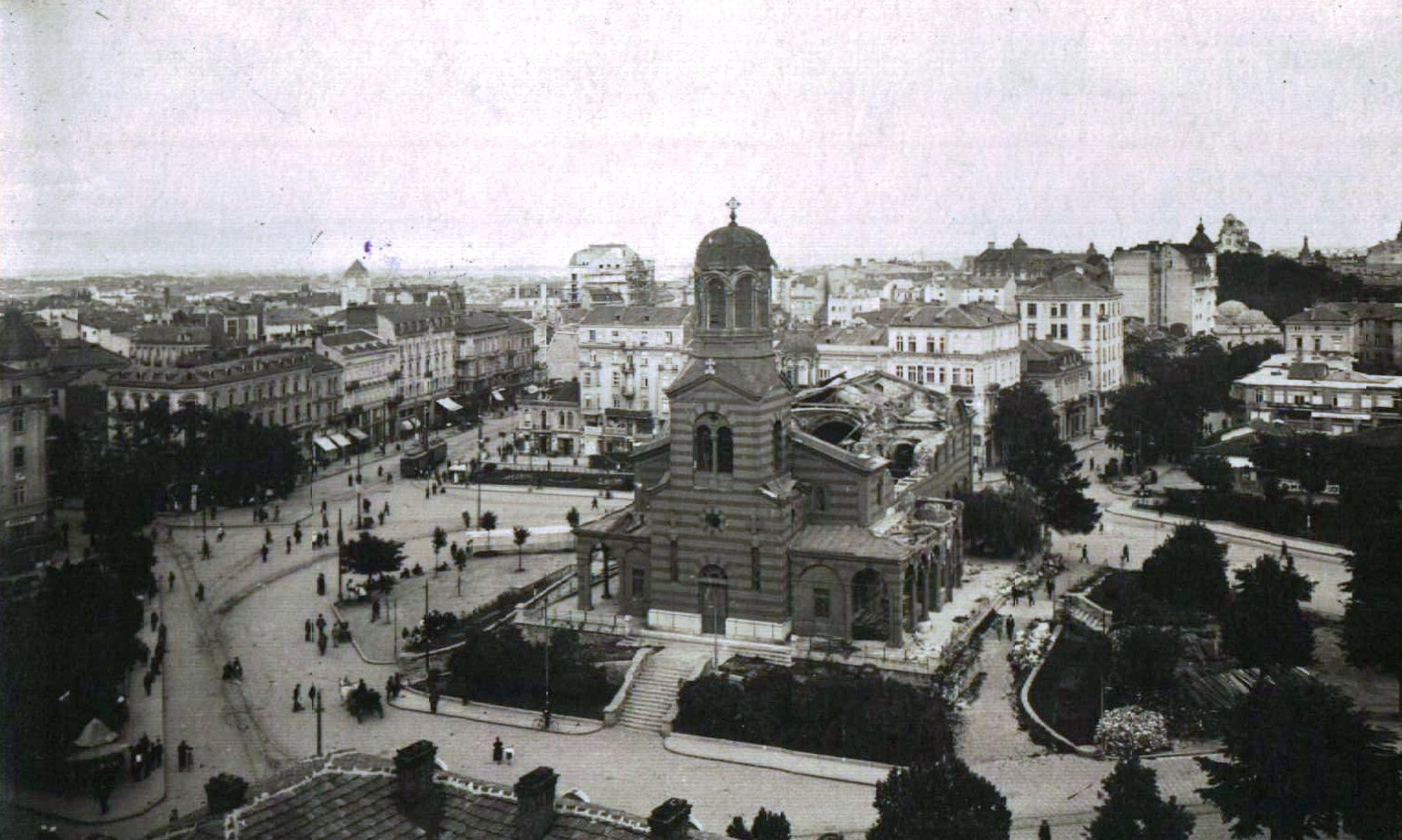
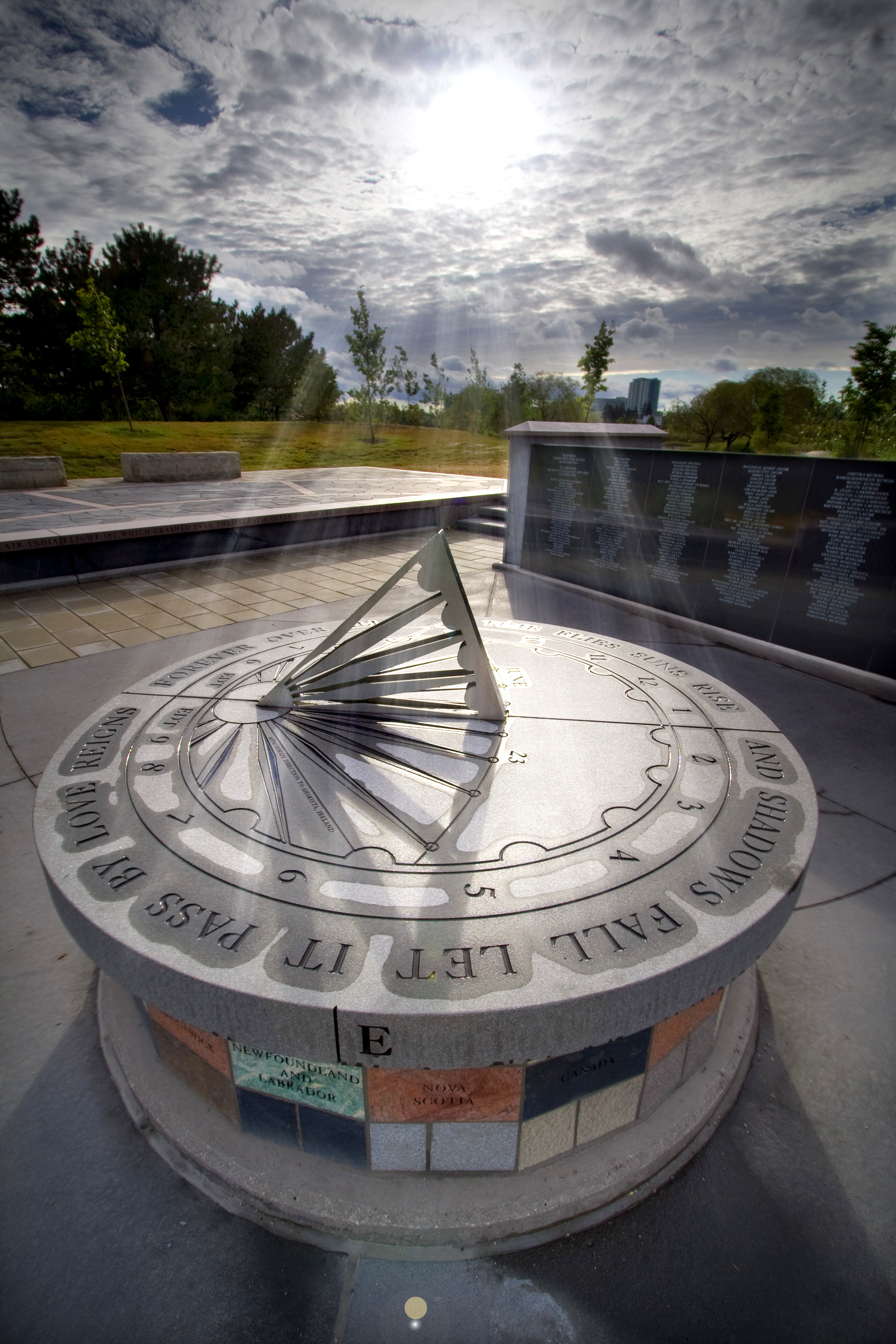
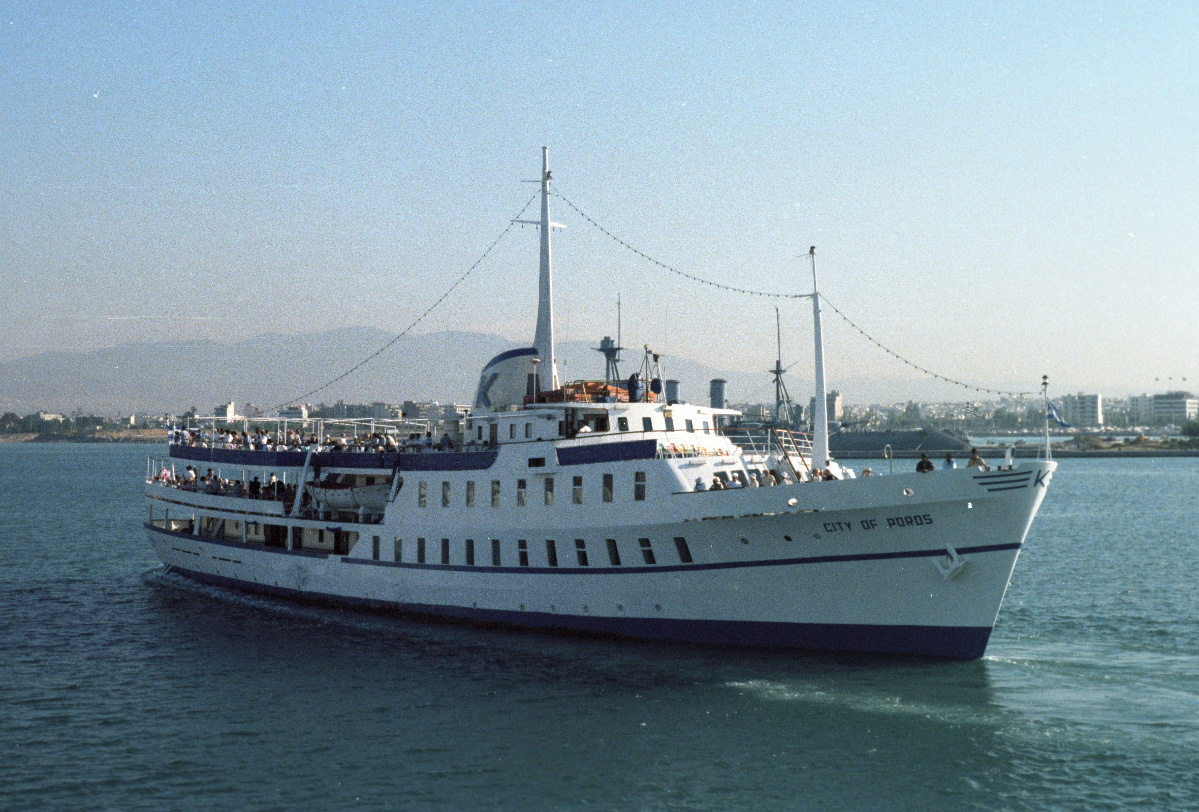
The bombing of St. Nedelya Church in Sofia in 1925 (left, St. Nedelya church after bombing), the bombing of Air India Flight 182 in 1985 (centre, memorial), and the City of Poros ship attack in 1988 (right, City of Poros in 1988) constitute the deadliest attacks carried out in Europe on land, in aviation, and in nautical transport respectively, killing 213, 329, and 11 people.

Terrorism in Europe has a long and bloody history. This has often been linked to nationalist and separatist movements (separating countries), while other acts have been related to politics (including anarchism, far-right and far-left extremism), religious extremism, or organized crime. Terrorism in the European sections of the Eurasian countries of Turkey and Russia is not included in this list.

== History ==
=== Definitions ===
There are more than one hundred definitions of terrorism in scholarly literature. Because the term is used in polemical contexts, the word itself can become part of the campaign. A simple definition would be "use of force against innocent people for political purposes". Some scholars argue that there is no true or correct definition due to terrorism being an abstract concept without a real presence. Legal definitions contain internal contradictions and might be misused. There is an overlap between terrorism and various other forms of conflict and violent action, including civil wars or non-international armed conflicts. This is the case with several significant non-international conflicts in Europe, where there thus can be dispute as to what counts as terrorism: examples include the Irish War of Independence (1919–21), the breakup of Yugoslavia and subsequent conflicts, the First (1994–1996) and Second Chechen Wars (1999–2009), and the War of Dagestan (1999).

=== Early history ===
In the Middle Ages, maritime nations in Europe sponsored pirates and privateering against rivals, which can be compared to terrorism. The term "terror" is used about the Reign of Terror in France, carried out by the Jacobins in 1792–1794.

=== Modern trends ===
Statistics from 2006 to 2013 by affiliation

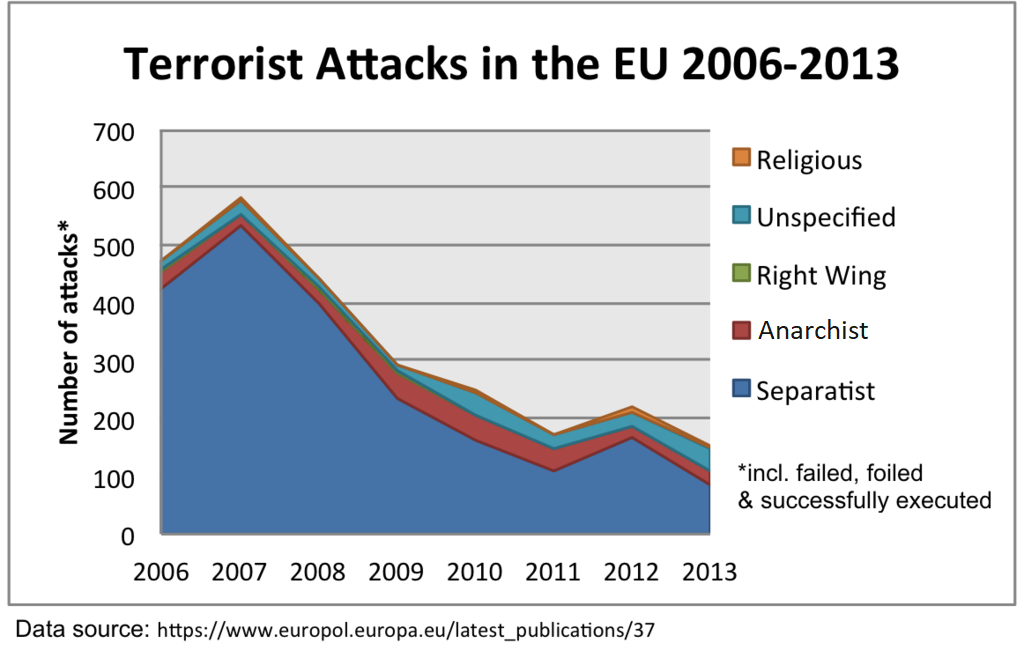
Attacks

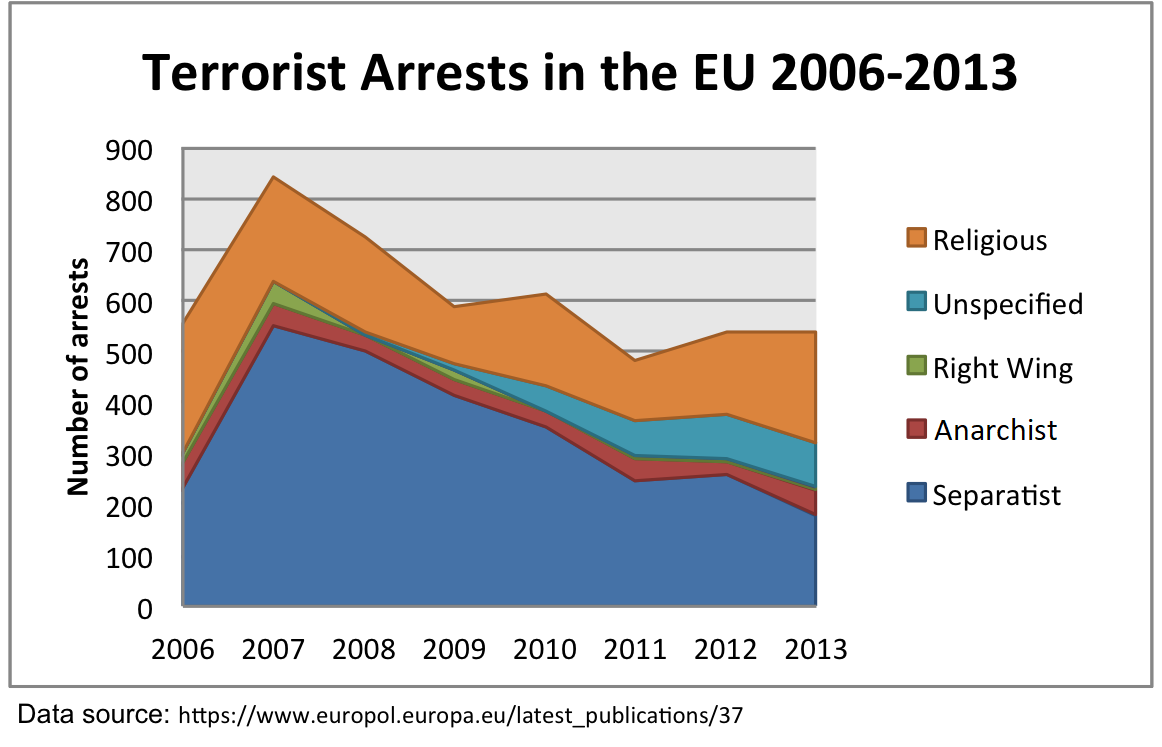
Arrests

Terrorism in Europe around the beginning of the twentieth century was often associated with anarchism.

Terrorism within the European Communities since 1951 has often been linked to separatist movements, including the Irish Republican Army within the United Kingdom, and Euskadi Ta Askatasuna within Spain. Other perpetrators have been linked to far-right and far-left extremism, environmental extremism, and anarchism. Since 2001, there has been an increase in attacks linked to extremist groups, particularly in France. Many separatist terrorist activities also have a religious angle, as, for example, with Chechen separatism in Russia.

There have been recent increases in the number of high-fatality attacks. There had been a decrease in the number of overall fatalities from terrorist attacks between 1990 and 2015, compared to those between 1970 and 1990. Before 1990, on average 150 people died each year from terrorist attacks; this figure would be even higher if the large number of people who died in 1988 from the Pan Am 2013 bombing were included. From 1990, an average of a little under 50 people died each year. There was an increase in fatalities from 2011, with the attacks by far-right extremist Anders Breivik in Norway, and Islamist extremist attacks in France in 2015 and 2016.

Europol has published an annual trend report on terrorist attacks (including failed, foiled, and completed attacks) and terrorist-related arrests in the EU since 2006. The reports identify that perpetrators' known or suspected affiliations have been disparate in nature. Europol breaks these down into five categories: jihadist terrorism (previously termed "religiously-inspired terrorism"); ethno-nationalist and separatist terrorism; left-wing and anarchist terrorism; right-wing terrorism; and single-issue terrorism. Europol's reports do not provide a breakdown of the proportion of attacks that have been completed or the type of damage inflicted. According to these data, the vast majority of terrorist attacks in the EU between 2006 and 2013 were affiliated with ethnonational or separatist motives, followed by left-wing and anarchist attacks, and those that are registered as 'unspecified'. A significant number of terror attacks were motivated by religion or associated with right-wing groups. Among those arrested on terror-related crimes, most were religiously motivated and form the largest group, followed by separatist-related terror suspects.

In 2015, a total of 211 completed, failed, or foiled terrorist attacks were reported by EU states, resulting in 151 fatalities (of which 148 were in France, with 130 of them occurring during the November 2015 Paris attacks) and over 360 people injured. As in previous years, separatist attacks accounted for the largest proportion (65), followed by jihadist attacks (17). Jihadist attacks caused the largest number of fatalities (150) and injuries (250). The United Kingdom reported the largest number of attacks (103) but did not provide statistics on suspected affiliation. Tackling jihadist terrorism threats has become an over-riding priority for security services, although many commentators express concerns that the risk of far-right terrorism is currently being underestimated.

In 2017, British intelligence MI5 said that Northern Ireland is the most concentrated area of terrorist activity "probably anywhere in Europe", with weekly threats from dissident Irish republicans. Europol report all deaths from terrorist activity in 2018 were caused by jihadist terrorism. As of 2019, Europol reported that left-wing terrorist groups in the EU had appeared to have ceased their operational activities. In 2023, Hamas-linked operatives, planning a terrorist attack against Jews and Israelis in Denmark, were arrested by the Mossad and Danish authorities.

== Prevention ==
=== International cooperation ===
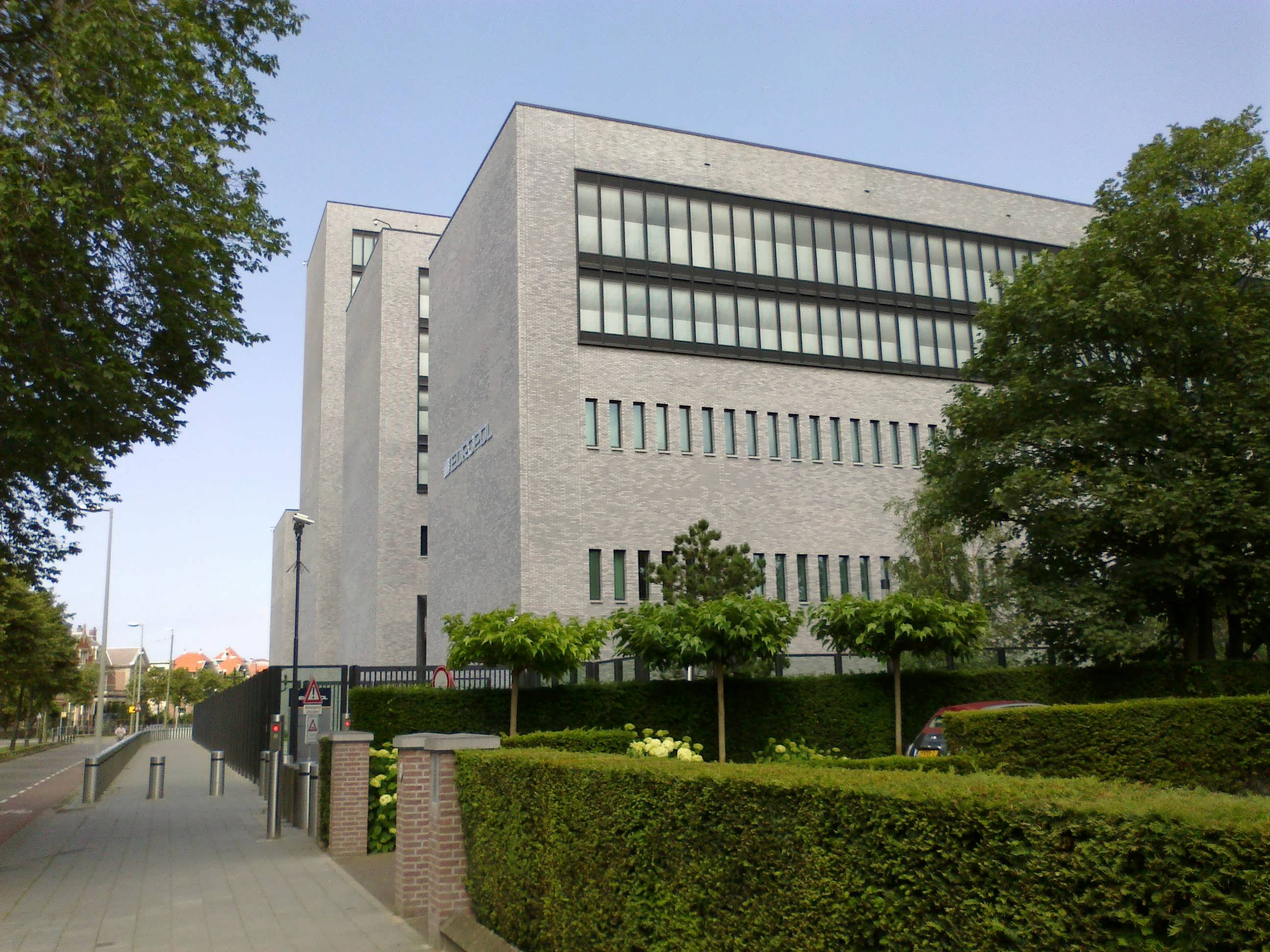
The seat of the European Police Office (Europol) in The Hague.

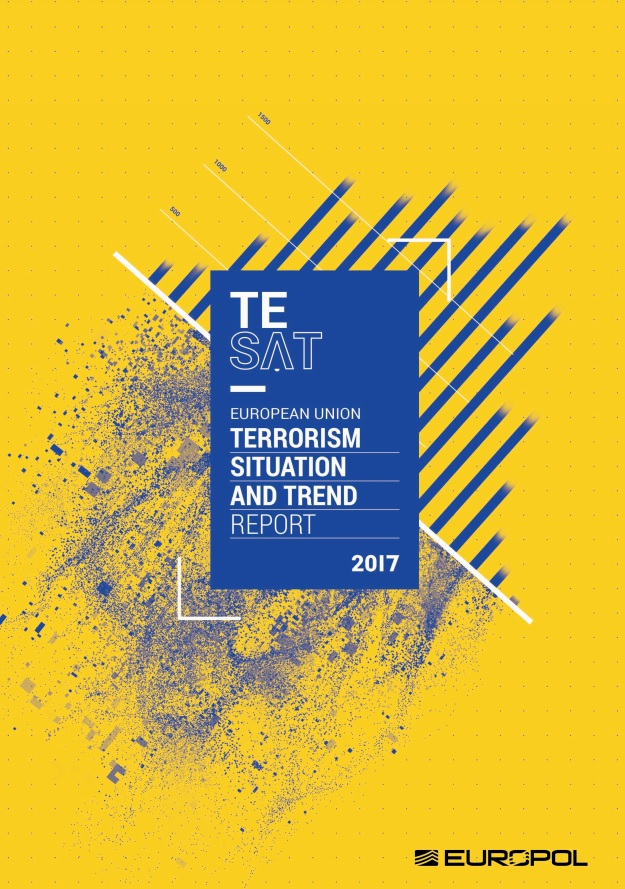
Cover of the Terrorism Situation and Trend Report (TE-SAT) 2017

European states were at the fore of plans for an international criminal court under the League of Nations in the 1930s, working through the Committee for the Repression of Terrorism (CRT). The CRT sought to define terrorism and get the nation's domestic policies to support anti-terrorism activities. Opposition by Britain and tensions over fascism in Germany and Italy limited the final proposals.

Current European cooperation in the field of counterterrorism includes the European Police Office (Europol), an EU agency, and Interpol. TREVI was an early example of EU cooperation in this field. The main transnational activity to combat terrorism in recent years has been through Europol. They have categorised acts of terrorism that have either failed, been foiled, or been successfully executed within the European Union (EU) as either about religious issues, right-wing, left-wing, or separatist movements. The field is subject to considerable cooperation among national authorities.

=== National authorities ===
In July 2014, France introduced legislation to combat terrorism by toughening surveillance, making it lawful to detain individuals linked to radical "Islamist" groups, and to block Internet sites that incite anti-Semitism, terrorism, and hatred. The country's Interior Minister Bernard Cazeneuve revealed 600 French nationals were in Syria at the time or planned to go there. The bill includes a ban on foreign travel for up to six months for those believed to hold terrorist sympathies, provides for the confiscation and invalidation of passports, and prohibits airlines from allowing such individuals to fly.

From 2005, the United Kingdom government introduced the CONTEST strategy, which seeks to improve co-operation between security services and other public and private organisations. This includes four strands, namely Pursue, (seeking to apprehend potential terrorists), Prevent, (seeking to reduce risks of 'radicalisation', deter potential terrorists and share information), Protect, (seeking to ensure the security of potential targets and organisations is optimised), and Prepare, (seeking to ensure an effective response in the immediate aftermath of any attack). Similar strategies have been adopted by other countries across the European Union, and there have been increases in co-operation between nations and security forces.

== Incidents ==
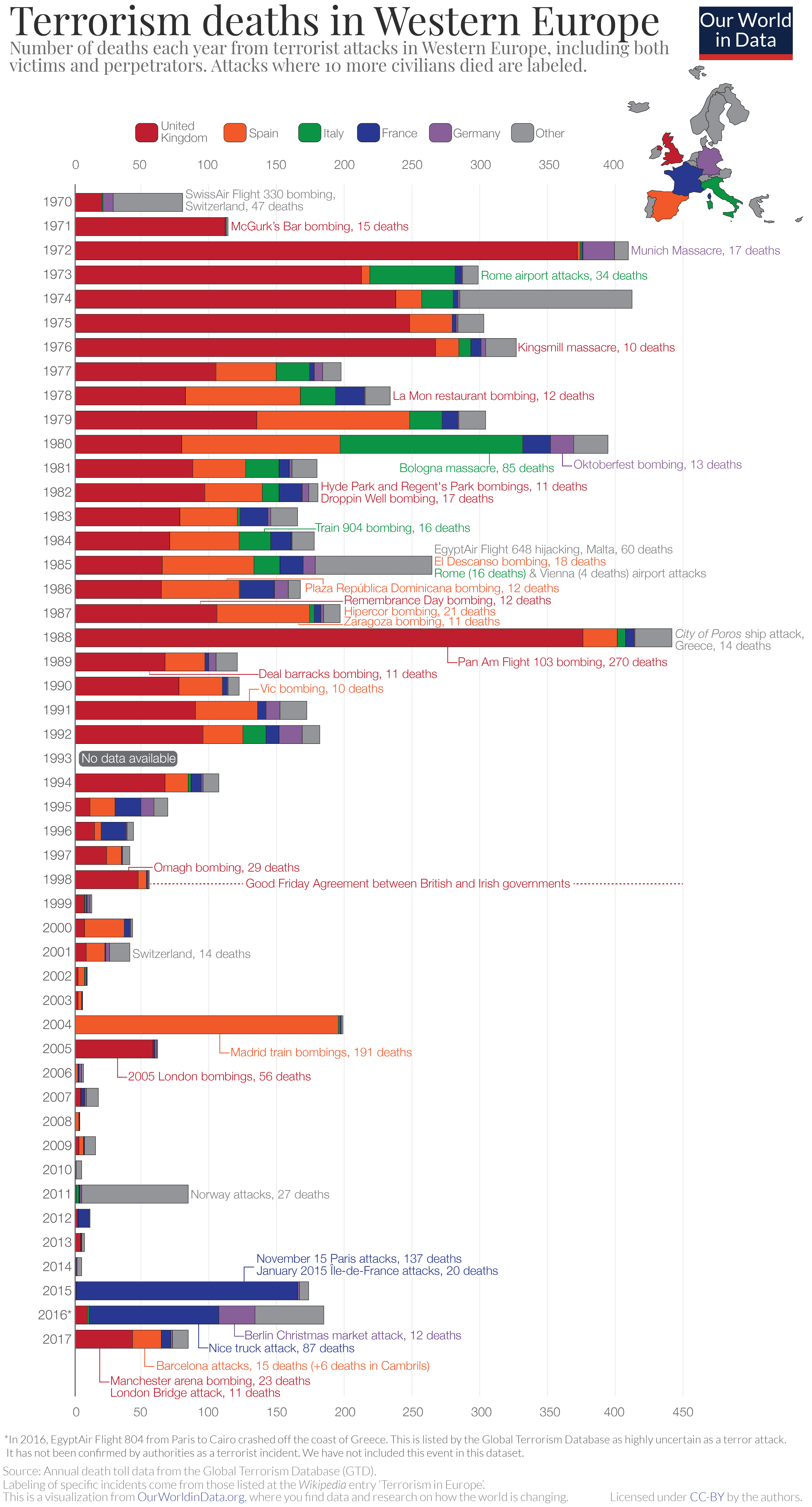
Terrorism deaths in Western Europe 1970–2017, based on the Global Terrorism Database. Red is for deaths in the UK, orange for Spain, green for Italy, blue for France, and purple for Germany. Grey are other countries.

=== Deadliest attacks ===
The following is a list of terrorist incidents in Europe that resulted in at least ten civilian deaths. It lists attacks on civilians by non-state actors that are widely referred to as terrorism. It excludes attacks that took place in transcontinental countries such as Turkey and Russia. For incidents in Russia, see Terrorism in Russia and for incidents in Turkey, see Terrorism in Turkey.

Key: motivation

Nationalism/Separatism Islamist Right-wing Left-wing Other

Date	Country/Region	Incident	Casualties	Perpetrator
28 Jul 1835	France	Assassination attempt on King Louis Philippe I	18 killed, 23 injured (inc. 1 perp.)	Giuseppe Marco Fieschi
13 Dec 1867	UK	Clerkenwell explosion	12 killed, 120 injured	Irish Republican Brotherhood
7 Nov 1893	Spain	Gran Teatre del Liceu bombing	20+ killed, 40+ injured	Santiago Salvador Franch
7 Jun 1896	Spain	Barcelona Corpus Christi procession bombing	12 killed, 44 injured	Anarchists (suspected)
28 Apr 1903	Ottoman Empire	Thessaloniki bombings of 1903	16 killed (inc. 6 perp.), 16 injured	Boatmen of Thessaloniki
31 May 1906	Spain	Botched assassination of Alfonso XIII	30 killed, 100 injured	Mateo Morral Rocca
15 Aug 1906	Congress Poland	Bloody Wednesday	19 to 200 killed, 43 to 100 injured	Combat Organization of the Polish Socialist Party
13 Dec 1921	Romania	Bolgrad palace bombing	100 killed	Bessarabian separatists
23 Mar 1923	Italy	Diana Theatre bombing	21 killed, 172 injured	Anarchists
16 Apr 1925	Bulgaria	St Nedelya Church bombing	213 killed, 500+ injured	Bulgarian Communist Party
18 Jun 1961	France	Vitry-Le-François train bombing	28 killed, 100+ injured	Organisation Armée Secrète
12 Dec 1969	Italy	Piazza Fontana bombing	17 killed, 88 injured	Ordine Nuovo
21 Feb 1970	Switzerland	Swissair Flight 330 bombing	47 killed	PFLP-GC
4 Dec 1971	UK	McGurk's Bar bombing	15 killed, 17 injured	Ulster Volunteer Force
26 Jan 1972	Czechoslovakia	JAT Flight 367 bombing	27 killed	Ustaše (suspected)
5 Sep 1972	West Germany	Munich massacre	17 killed(inc. 5 perpetrators)	Black September
17 Dec 1973	Italy	Rome airport attacks	34 killed, 22 injured(inc. 1 perpetrator)	Black September
17 May 1974	Ireland	Dublin and Monaghan bombings	34 killed, 300 injured	Ulster Volunteer Force
4 Aug 1974	Italy	Italicus Express bombing	12 killed, 48 injured	Ordine Nero
8 Sep 1974	Greece	TWA Flight 841 bombing	88 killed	Abu Nidal Organization
13 Sep 1974	Spain	Cafetería Rolando bombing	13 killed, 71 injured	ETA
21 Nov 1974	UK	Birmingham pub bombings	21 killed, 182 injured	Provisional IRA
5 Jan 1976	UK	Kingsmill massacre	10 killed, 1 injured	South Armagh Republican Action Force
17 Feb 1978	UK	La Mon restaurant bombing	12 killed, 30 injured	Provisional IRA
2 Aug 1980	Italy	Bologna massacre	85 killed, 200+ injured	Nuclei Armati Rivoluzionari
26 Sep 1980	West Germany	Oktoberfest bombing	13 killed (inc. 1 perp.), 211 injured	Gundolf Köhler
23 Dec 1984	Italy	Train 904 bombing	16 killed, 267 injured	Sicilian Mafia
12 Apr 1985	Spain	El Descanso bombing	18 killed, 82 injured	Islamic Jihad Organization
23 Jun 1985	(Republic of Ireland) Atlantic Ocean in Irish airspace	Air India Flight 182 bombing	329 killed	Babbar Khalsa
23 Nov 1985	Malta	EgyptAir Flight 648 hijacking	60 killed (inc. 2 perps.)	Abu Nidal Organization
27 Dec 1985	Italy; Austria	Rome and Vienna airport attacks	23 killed (inc. 4 perps.), 139 injured	Abu Nidal Organization
14 Jul 1986	Spain	Plaza República Dominicana bombing	12 killed, 32 injured	ETA
19 Jun 1987	Spain	Hipercor bombing	21 killed, 45 injured	ETA
8 Nov 1987	UK	Remembrance Day bombing	12 killed, 63 injured	Provisional IRA
11 Dec 1987	Spain	Zaragoza Barracks bombing	11 killed, 88 injured	ETA
21 Dec 1988	UK	Pan Am Flight 103 bombing	270 killed	Abdelbaset al-Megrahi
29 May 1991	Spain	Vic bombing	10 killed, 44 injured	ETA
15 Aug 1998	UK	Omagh bombing	29 killed, 300+ injured	Real IRA
16 Feb 2001	FR Yugoslavia	Podujevo bus bombing	12 killed, 40 injured	Kosovo Albanian Militants (suspected)
11 Mar 2004	Spain	Madrid train bombings	193 killed, 2,050 injured	Al-Qaeda
7 Jul 2005	UK	2005 London bombings	56 killed, (inc. 4 perps.), 784 injured	Al-Qaeda
11 Apr 2011	Belarus	Minsk Metro bombing	15 killed, 204 injured	Dzimitry Kanavalau and Vladislav Kavalyou
22 Jul 2011	Norway	Norway attacks	77 killed, 319 injured	Anders Behring Breivik
7–9 Jan 2015	France	January 2015 Île-de-France attacks	20 killed (inc. 3 perps.), 22 injured	Al-Qaeda
13 Jan 2015	Ukraine	Volnovakha bus attack	12 killed, 18 injured	Donetsk People's Republic (suspected)
13 Nov 2015	France	November 2015 Paris attacks	137 killed (inc. 7 perps.), 413 injured	Islamic State
22 Mar 2016	Belgium	Brussels bombings	35 killed (inc. 3 perps.), 340 injured	Islamic State
14 Jul 2016	France	Nice truck attack	87 killed (inc. 1 perp.), 434 injured	Islamic State
22 July 2016	Germany	2016 Munich shooting	10 killed (inc. 1 perp.), 36 injured	David Sonboly
19 Dec 2016	Germany	Berlin Christmas market attack	13 killed, 55 injured	Islamic State
22 May 2017	UK	Manchester Arena bombing	23 killed (inc. 1 perp.), 250 injured	Salman Ramadan Abedi
17–18 Aug 2017	Spain	2017 Barcelona attacks	24 killed (inc. 8 perps.), 152 injured	Islamic State
17 Oct 2018	Ukraine/Russia	Kerch college bombing and shooting	21 killed (inc. 1 perpetrator), around 70 injured	Vladislav Roslyakov
19 Feb 2020	Germany	Hanau shootings	12 killed (inc. 1 perp.), 4 injured	Tobias Rathjen
27 Jun 2023	Ukraine	Kramatorsk restaurant missile strike	13 killed, 65 injured	Russian separatists
7 Nov 2026	Poland	2026 Kraków shooting	10 killed (inc. 1 perpetrator), 16 injured	Michał Oksiński

=== Costliest attacks ===
These are the incidents that had the most serious financial damage. By far the biggest three are listed below, all having occurred in the United Kingdom, and all by the same organisation.

Date	Country/Region	Incident	Cost (USD)	Perpetrator
24 Apr 1993	(United Kingdom) London, UK	1993 Bishopsgate bombing	$2 billion	Provisional IRA
15 Jun 1996	(United Kingdom) Manchester, UK	1996 Manchester bombing	$996 million	Provisional IRA
10 Apr 1992	(United Kingdom) City of London, UK	Baltic Exchange bombing	$897 million	Provisional IRA

=== Terrorism by country and region ===
- Terrorism in Belgium
- Terrorism in Bosnia and Herzegovina
- Terrorism in Denmark
- Terrorism in France
- Terrorism in Germany
- Terrorism in Greece
- Terrorism in Italy
- Terrorism in the Netherlands
- Terrorism in North Macedonia
- Terrorism in Norway
- Terrorism in Russia
- Terrorism in Serbia
- Terrorism in Spain
- Terrorism in Sweden
- Terrorism in Switzerland
- Terrorism in Turkey
- Terrorism in the United Kingdom

== See also ==
- Islamic terrorism in Europe
- List of terrorist incidents
- Terrorism in the United States
- Terrorism in India
- Left-wing terrorism
- Right-wing terrorism
- Russian sabotage in Europe

== Bibliography ==
- Barry M. Rubin; Judith Colp Rubin (2008). Chronologies of Modern Terrorism. M.E. Sharpe. ISBN 9780765622068.
- Besenyo, Janos (2017). "ATACURI PUŢIN COSTISITOARE, COMPLOTURI IMPERCEPTIBILE? PREZENTARE GENERALĂ PRIVIND CARACTERUL ECONOMIC AL TERORISMULUI ACTUAL" [Low Cost Attacks, Imperceptible Plots? General Presentation on the Economic Character of Current Terrorism]. Impact Strategic (in Romanian). 62 (1): 84–101. ISSN 1582-6511.
- Poland, J.M (1988). Understanding Terrorism. Englewood Cliffs. NJ: Prentice-Hall.
