= Revolutionary Party of the Proletariat (Portugal) =

Revolutionary Party of the Proletariat - Revolutionary Brigades Partido Revolucionário do Proletariado - Brigadas Revolucionárias
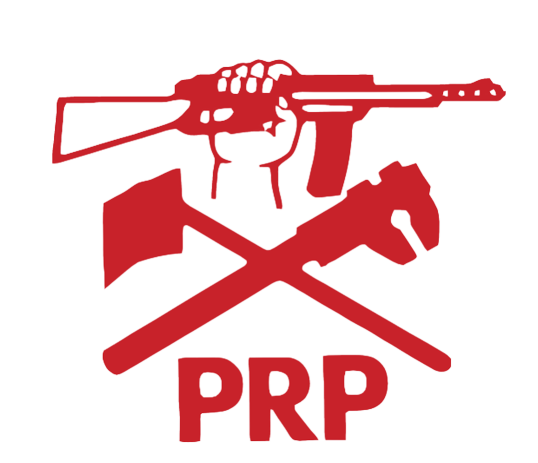
- Leader: Carlos Antunes and Isabel do Carmo
- Founded: 1973
- Dissolved: 1976 (banned)
- Ideology: Marxism; Guevarism; Popular Power
- Political position: Far-Left

Party flag
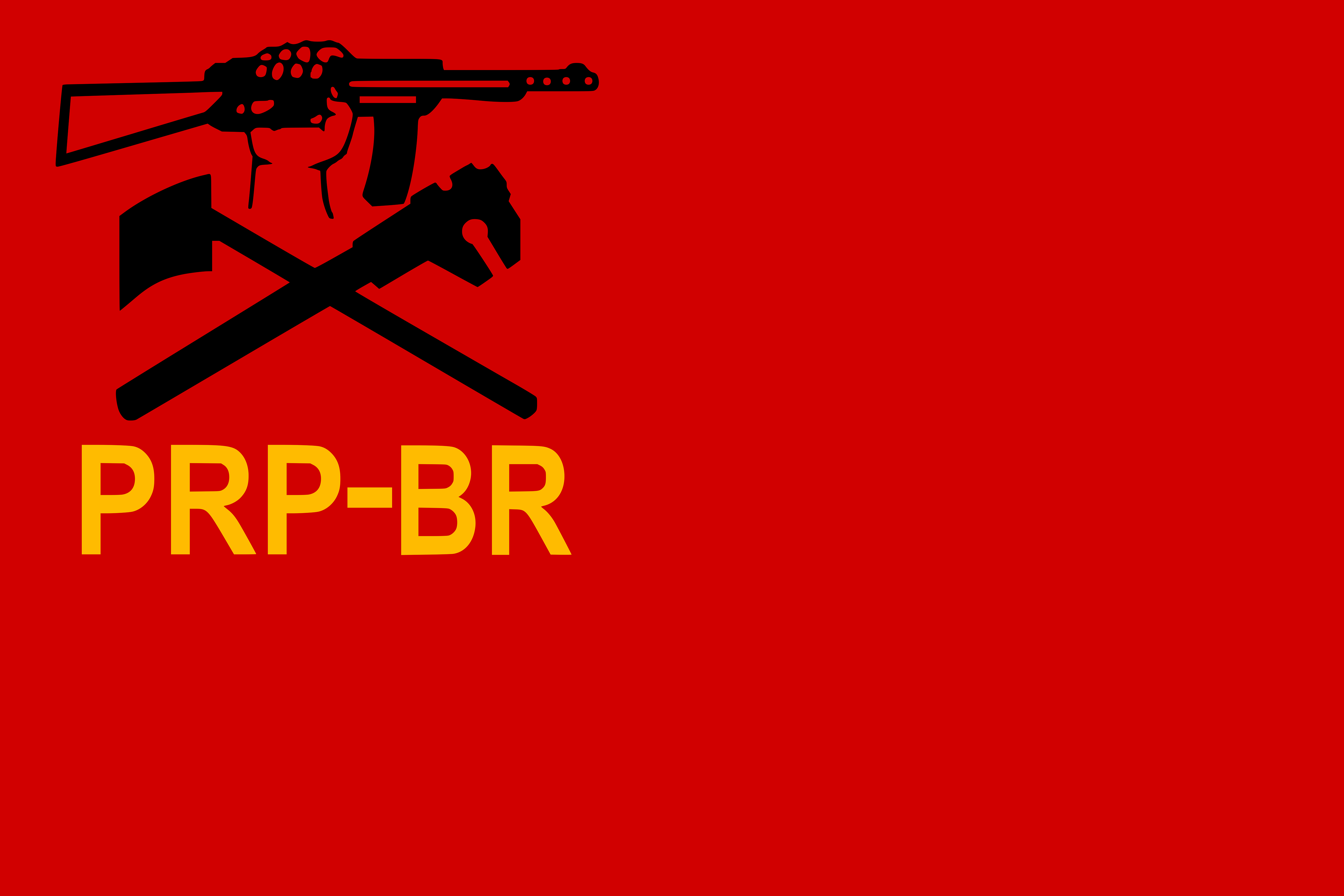

The Revolutionary Party of the Proletariat (Portuguese: Partido Revolucionário do Proletariado, PRP) was a revolutionary socialist political organization in Portugal. The Revolutionary Brigades were founded in 1970 by Isabel do Carmo, Carlos Antunes and Pedro Goulart, and advocated armed struggle against the regime. The first armed action was carried out in 1971. PRP-BR was constructed as a party later. In 1975 the PRP attempted to create a School of Proletarian Culture as an alternative to bourgeois education. The PRP supported the candidacy for the 1976 presidential elections of Otelo Saraiva de Carvalho. After November 25, 1975, PRP and Revolutionary Brigades were formally separated. PRP-BR did not participate in elections after the advent of democracy in Portugal.

== See also ==
- Popular Forces 25 April
