= 2020 Lugano stabbing attack =

Stabbing attack in Switzerland

2020 Lugano stabbing
- Location: Lugano, Ticino, Switzerland
- Date: 24 November 2020
- Attack type: Stabbing
- Weapon: Knife
- Injuries: 2

The 2020 Lugano stabbing attack was a terrorist attack in the afternoon of 24 November 2020, where a 28-year-old Swiss woman attacked two female customers with a knife in the Manor store in Lugano, Ticino Canton, Switzerland. The Office of the Attorney General classified the act as a terrorist-motivated attack carried out in the name of the Islamic State. The Criminal Chamber of the Federal Criminal Court in Bellinzona sentenced her to nine years in prison for attempted murder. The Appeals Chamber classified the act as a terrorist attack.

The perpetrator was stopped by intervening customers. One of the women who were attacked was injured seriously. The Federal Office of Police suspected the attack had an Islamist motive. The attacker was already known to Swiss authorities in connection with jihadism and sympathizing with the Islamic State. According to police she had previously tried to travel to Syria to fight for the group, but was arrested by Turkish security forces at the Syrian-Turkish border and sent back to Switzerland.

In 2022, the woman was formally indicted on charges of attempted murder. The prosecutors accused her of carrying out an Islamic extremist attack on behalf of ISIL.

== See also ==
- 2020 Morges stabbing attack
- Terrorism in Switzerland
