= COPCON =

Operational Command of the Continent
- Comando Operacional do Continente; COPCON
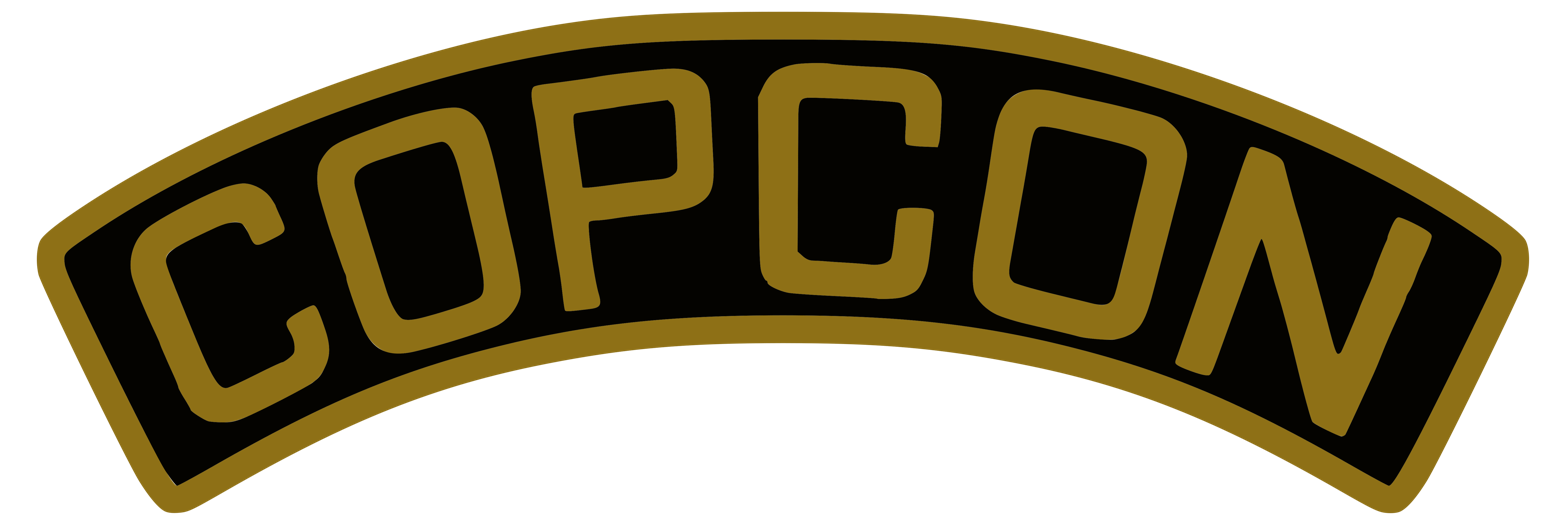
- Active: 1974–1975
- Country: Portugal
- Allegiance: Armed Forces Movement
- Branch: Portuguese Army
- Anniversaries: 8 July
- Engagements: Coup of 25 November 1975

Commanders
- Commander: Major Otelo Saraiva de Carvalho

The Comando Operacional do Continente (COPCON, English: Operational Command of the Continent) was a military command for Portugal created by the Armed Forces Movement in the period following the revolution of 25 April 1974 and was dissolved after the failed far left coup of 25 November 1975.

COPCON was created on 8 July 1974 by President António de Spínola, with the aim of protecting the democratic process initiated by the Carnation Revolution. It consisted of special military forces such as marines, paratroopers, commandos, military police.

Copcon chief Otelo Saraiva de Carvalho, accumulated Copcon with the command of the Military Region of Lisbon, assuming himself as one of the drivers of the Revolutionary Process also known as PREC. He was one considered to be of the most powerful persons during this revolutionary period.

Otelo and Copcon gained prominence after the revolution of March 11, 1975, and during almost the entire revolutionary period known as PREC. Copcon was responsible for issuing several blank arrest warrants and for the indiscriminate arrest of thousands of people, without any formal charges or court order, but with charges such as economic sabotage. He was also backing land occupation in Alentejo and house occupation mostly in Lisbon. Also famous was the arrest of around 400 far left MRPP militants on 28 May 1975.

In August 1975, the “Documento dos Nove” was published in a newspaper. It was also known as Melo Antunes Document and had unpredictable effects both in the military and in the civil field. It constituted a common platform for all those who, dissatisfied with the growing hegemony of the Communist Party within Vasco Gonçalves government as well as the far-left radical groups allied with the Copcon. It advocated a change in the course taken by the government as well as the overall revolutionary process.

In response, COPCON officials published the document “Copcon's Revolutionary Self-Criticism/Work Proposal for a Political Programme”. This proposed a radical political model based on grassroots popular power and would later have the support of the far left parties like PRP/BR, the MES and the UDP.

In September 1975, Otelo was relieved of his duties at Copcon with the creation of the AMI (Military Intervention Group) and on 20 November, he was replaced in command of the Lisbon Military Region by Vasco Lourenço.
