= USS Richard E. Byrd (DDG-23) =

Charles F. Adams-class destroyer

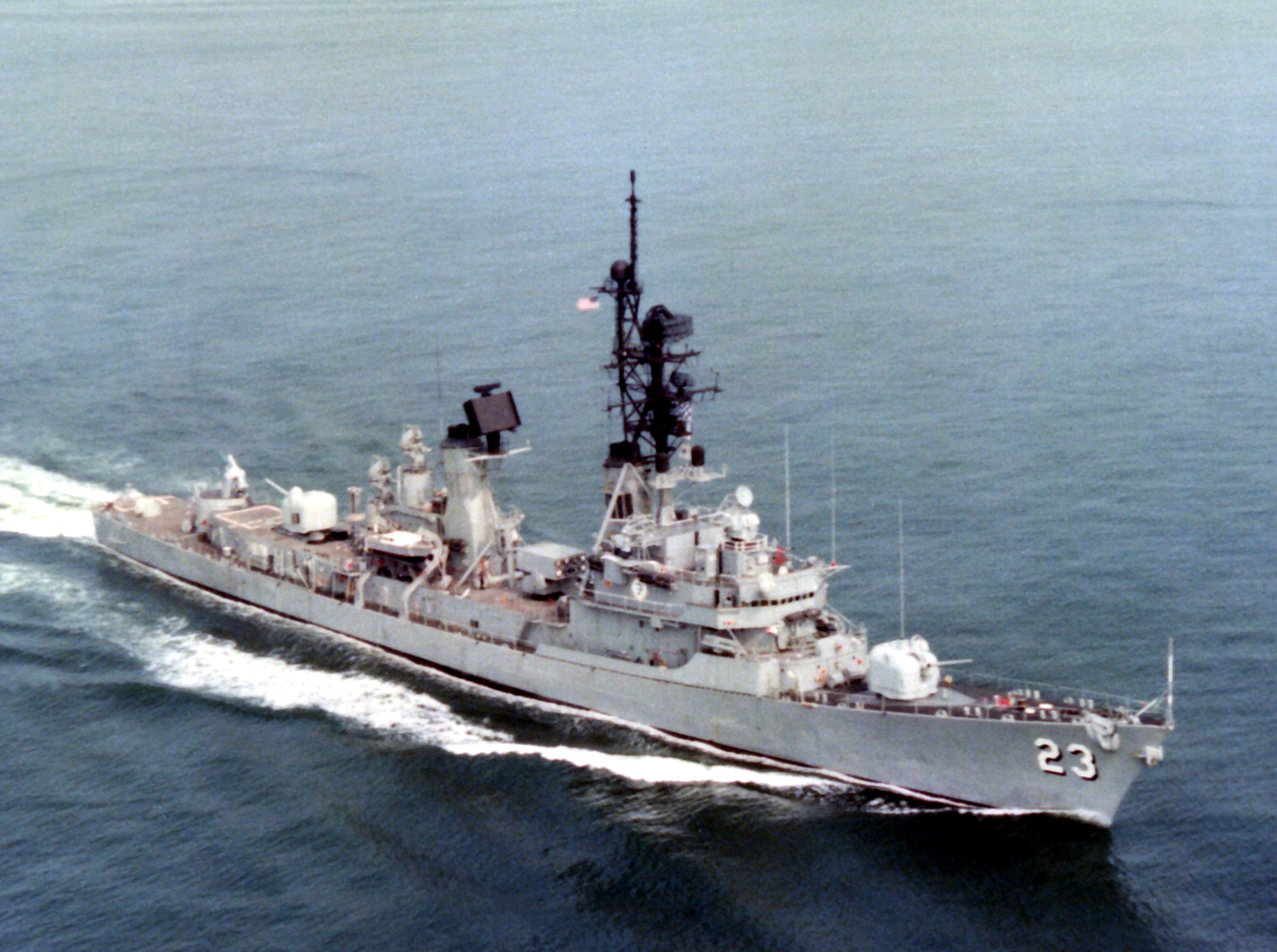
- USS Richard E. Byrd underway in 1983

History

United States
- Name: Richard E. Byrd
- Namesake: Richard E. Byrd
- Ordered: 3 November 1960
- Builder: Todd Shipbuilding Corp.
- Laid down: 12 April 1961
- Launched: 6 February 1962
- Commissioned: 7 March 1964
- Decommissioned: 27 April 1990
- Stricken: 1 October 1992
- Identification: Callsign: NHSN; Hull number: DDG-23
- Motto: Inter Utrosque Polos Tridens; (Sea Power from Pole to Pole)
- Fate: Sold to Greece for parts; Sunk as target, 19 June 2003

General characteristics
- Class & type: Charles F. Adams-class destroyer
- Displacement: 3,277 tons standard, 4,526 full load
- Length: 437 ft (133 m)
- Beam: 47 ft (14 m)
- Draft: 15 ft (4.6 m)
- Propulsion: 2 × Westinghouse steam turbines providing 70,000 shp (52 MW); 2 shafts; 4 × Foster-Wheeler 1,275 psi (8,790 kPa) boilers
- Speed: 33 knots (61 km/h; 38 mph)
- Range: 4,500 nautical miles (8,300 km) at 20 knots (37 km/h)
- Complement: 354 (24 officers, 330 enlisted)
- Sensors & processing systems: AN/SPS-39 3D air search radar; AN/SPS-10 surface search radar; AN/SPG-51 missile fire control radar; AN/SPG-53 gunfire control radar; AN/SQS-23 Sonar and the hull mounted SQQ-23 Pair Sonar for DDG-2 through 19; AN/SPS-40 Air Search Radar
- Armament: 1 Mk 11 missile launcher (DDG2-14) or Mk 13 single arm missile launcher (DDG-15-24) for RIM-24 Tartar SAM system, or later the RIM-66 Standard (SM-1) and Harpoon antiship missile; 2 × 5 in (127 mm)/54 caliber Mark 42 gun; 1 × RUR-5 ASROC launcher; 6 × 12.8 in (325 mm) ASW torpedo tubes (2 x Mark 32 Surface Vessel Torpedo Tubes)

USS Richard E. Byrd (DDG-23), was a Charles F. Adams-class guided missile destroyer of the United States Navy, named after noted polar explorer Admiral Richard E. Byrd.

The keel for Richard E. Byrd was laid on 12 April 1961 by Todd Shipbuilding Corp. Seattle, Washington. She was launched on 6 February 1962; sponsored by Mrs. Richard E. Byrd, whose daughter, Mrs. Robert G. Breyer, acted as proxy sponsor for the admiral's wife. The ship was commissioned on 7 March 1964. Decommissioned on 27 April 1990, the ship sold to Greece and used for spare parts in 1992 and sunk as a target on 19 June 2003.

== Service ==
Following a 45-day fitting out period at Puget Sound Naval Shipyard, Bremerton, Washington, Richard E. Byrd steamed for her homeport of Norfolk, Virginia, via the Panama Canal, arriving 14 June 1964. Richard E. Byrd deployed to the Mediterranean 6 January 1965 as a unit of Destroyer Division 182.

Late January 1967 Richard E. Byrd moved south to the Jacksonville, Florida operations area, and, while serving as rescue destroyer for the aircraft carrier Lexington, she rescued Lt. (jg) John F. Dickinson, whose A-4E aircraft crashed during a landing approach. In May Richard E. Byrd was at sea as part of the screen of the carrier USS America, which force rendezvoused with the damaged USS Liberty on 9 June.

On 6 October 1969 ship and crew participated together with Senator Harry F. Byrd and Virginia Gov. Mills E. Godwin, in the dedication of Richard Evelyn Byrd Hall at the Virginia Institute of Marine Science at Gloucester Point, Virginia.

On 26 January 1975, an advance party landing party of two ship officers were mobbed by an angry demonstration of 4,000 Greeks on the island of Corfu. After being stoned, attempts were made to set their car on fire and lynch the occupants. One Greek was killed in the incident, but police and fire trucks successfully escorted the two back to their ship off shore. Over the next hours the protest demonstration regarding the Cypriot War swelled to 10,000, and Richard E. Byrd ended her port visit.

Early 1985, the start of a six-month North Atlantic cruise involved a port visit to Lisbon, Portugal. At the end of the visit on 28 January about 3 a.m. local GMT, five other NATO ships and Richard E. Byrd at Alcantara dock came under mortar fire from the terrorist group Forças Populares 25 de Abril without damage.

== Decommissioning ==
The guided missile destroyer continued to serve until decommissioned on 27 April 1990. She was struck from the Navy list on 1 October 1992 and officially transferred to the Hellenic Navy on 26 August 1993. The hulk was towed to Salamis, Greece, on 12 October 1993 where she was used for spare parts for the other four Charles F. Adams destroyers in Greek service.

== See also ==
The second United States Navy ship to be named after Admiral Richard E. Byrd was USNS Richard E. Byrd, a Lewis and Clark-class dry cargo ship.
