= Carlos Antunes =

Portuguese revolutionary and politician (1938–2021)

Carlos Carneiro Antunes (June 1938 – 23 January 2021) was a Portuguese terrorist and politician. He was, together with Isabel do Carmo, co-founder of the Brigadas Revolucionárias a Portuguese far-left terrorist organization that acted in Portugal between 1970 and 1980.

== Biography ==
He was born in June 1938 in São Pedro, Braga District. He joined the Portuguese Communist Party in 1955, aged just 16 and was responsible for the clandestine organization of the party in Minho Province. He lived in Romania and Paris, where he was responsible for organizing the PCP abroad and participated in the creation of the Portuguese People's Aid Committees, and where he worked with Álvaro Cunhal, a historic Portuguese communist leader. He left PCP in 1968 after disagreements with Cunhal on matters such as the Warsaw Pact invasion of Czechoslovakia or the Portuguese Colonial War. In 1969 founded with Isabel do Carmo, also a dissident of the PCP, the Revolutionary Brigades, an organization that defended armed struggle as a way to overthrow the fascist regime. He led them until 1974, participating, however, in the creation of the Revolutionary Party of the Proletariat (PRP) in 1973.

Even before April 25, 1974, at a meeting in Milan, Carlos Antunes informed Joaquim Chissano, FRELIMO's leader, and later President of Mozambique, of divergences within the Portuguese Armed Forces regarding the continuity of the colonial war.

Together with Isabel do Carmo he directed the newspaper "Revolução", which was published between 1974 and 1977, and the newspaper "Página Um", a newspaper similarly close to the PRP, published from 1976 to 1978.

Despite the overthrown of the Portuguese dictatorship in 1974 the Brigadas Revolucionárias did not abandon armed violence. The BR became frustrated with the end of the revolutionary period and with the beginning of the consolidation of democracy and the preparation of Portugal's entry into the European Economic Community (EEC) and carried out a series of attacks and bank robberies. At the same time its political arm, the Partido Revolucionário do Proletariado, carried out its political activity supporting Otelo Saraiva de Carvalho in running for the presidency in 1976, and later promoting the creation of the Unitary Organization of Workers in whose first Congress in April 1978 participated other political parties with revolutionary links, such as: Spanish ETA, Autonomia Operaia(Italy), Polisario Front (Sahrawi Arab Democratic Republic); and the Popular Front for the Liberation of Oman.

The Revolutionary Party of the Proletariat (PRP) ended up never participating in elections because Carlos Antunes and Isabel do Carmo were against free elections. One of the motos of the PRP-BR was: "Say No to the Bourgeois Elections".

== Imprisonment ==
After 25 November 1975, lawsuits were opened against Isabel do Carmo and Carlos Antunes as moral perpetrators of armed violence, being accused and placed in pre-trial detention in 1977. At the trial, which began in 1979, Carlos Antunes and Isabel do Carmo were sentenced, respectively, to 14 and 15 years in prison. That year, dissidents of the PRP formed the Forças Populares 25 de Abril. Carlos Antunes remained in prison until 1982, being tried and acquitted five years later.

Within the Brigadas Revolucionárias the issue of the use of lethal violence and killings was something that had always been on the table and over time some BR members rebelled against the narratives of restraint that were defended mainly by Isabel do Carmo and Carlos Antunes. The imprisonment of Isabel do Carmo and Carlos Antunes proved decisive for the more radical faction inside the BR to move to deliberate killings. In November 1979, José Plácido, a member who had decided to abandon the PRP-BR and collaborate with justice, was murdered. Isabel do Carmo and Carlos Antunes not only denied any involvement but publicly criticized the crime.

The BR ended up being extinguished in 1980, due to internal disputes and the imprisonment of Carlos Antunes and Isabel do Carmo. Many of its members led by Pedro Goulart ended up joining the Forças Populares 25 de Abril the far-left terrorist group led by Otelo Saraiva de Carvalho.

After leaving prison, he joined eco-socialism, authoring the book Ecosocialismo, A green alternative for Europe. In April 2014, he participated in the film "Outro Forma de Luta", by director João Pinto Nogueira.

== Death ==
On 29 December 2020, he was admitted to the ICU of Hospital de Santa Maria, in Lisbon, after being infected with COVID-19 during Christmas amid the COVID-19 pandemic in Portugal. His ex-partner, Isabel do Carmo, as well as other family members who met around Christmas contracted COVID-19 and were admitted to the hospital. On the morning of 23 January 2021, Carlos Antunes fell into a coma and died in the afternoon at the age of 82.

== Sources ==
- Albright, David (2019). Communism And Political Systems In Western Europe. Routledge. ISBN 9780367167882.
- Da Silva, R.; Ferreira, A. S. (2020). "From the armed struggle against the dictatorship to the socialist revolution: the narrative restraints to lethal violence among radical left organisations in Portugal". Perspectives on Terrorism (6). Institute of Security and Global Affairs (ISGA) of Leiden University's: 139–151. ISSN 2334-3745.
- Ferreira, Ana (2008). Políticas de combate ao terrorismo: segurança colectiva versus direitos individuais (MSc). Portuguese Military Academy.
- Ferreira, Ana (2015). Luta Armada em Portugal (1970-1974) (PDF) (PhD). Universidade Nova de Lisboa.
- Gobern Lopes, Luís (November 3, 2022). "Iam preparados para disparar e matar? "Claro". As confissões de um ex-FP 25" (Both paper and eformat) (Interview) (in Portuguese). Interviewed by António José Vilela, Maria Henrique Espada. Revista Sábado.
- Harsgor, Michael (1976). Portugal in revolution. Beverly Hills, Calif.: Sage Publications. ISBN 9780803906471.
- Schmid, Alex P. (1988). Political terrorism : a new guide to actors and authors, data bases, and literature (Expanded and updated ed.). New Brunswick, N.J.: Transaction Publishers. p. 654. ISBN 9781412815666.

Terrorism in Portugal
