= 2020 Morges stabbing attack =

2020 stabbing attack in Morges, Switzerland

2020 Morges stabbing
- Location: Morges, Vaud, Switzerland
- Date: 12 September 2020
- Attack type: Stabbing
- Weapon: Knife
- Deaths: 1
- Injuries: 0

The 2020 Morges stabbing attack was a terrorist attack on the evening of 12 September 2020 where a randomly-chosen man was fatally stabbed in a kebab restaurant in Morges, Vaud canton, Switzerland. The accused, a Turkish-Swiss dual national, was known to the Swiss intelligence service as an Islamist and under surveillance for possible links to terrorism. The victim was a 29-year-old Portuguese man. While in custody of the Swiss police, the accused is alleged to have confessed that he acted in the name of jihadism. The Office of the Attorney General accused the defendant in the Morges attack of having planned and carried out a jihadist-motivated attack with the aim of avenging the victims of the war waged by coalition states against the so-called Islamic State. The attacker was sentenced to 20 years in prison.

== See also ==
- 2020 Lugano stabbing attack
