= Brigadas Revolucionárias =

The Brigadas Revolucionarias (BR) were a terrorist organization active in Portugal between 1970 and 1980.

Founded in 1970 by a group of dissidents from the Portuguese Communist Party, the BR were initially led by Isabel do Carmo, Carlos Antunes and Pedro Goulart, who were unhappy with the pacifist narrative of the Communist Party. The first bomb attack took place on November 7, 1971, against the NATO facilities in Fonte da Telha, Portugal. Most of its members were previously in the Communist Party, in particular Carlos Antunes and Isabel do Carmo, who kept Communist Party dominant no-kill narrative and preferred spectacular and media-centric actions instead.

Despite the overthrown of the Portuguese dictatorship in 1974, the BR did not abandon armed violence. The BR become frustrated with the end of the revolutionary period, the beginning of the consolidation of democracy and the preparation of Portugal’s entry into the European Economic Community (EEC). Accordingly, they carried out a series of bomb attacks and bank robberies from 1975 to 1980. At the same time its political arm, the Partido Revolucionário do Proletariado (PRP), supported Otelo Saraiva de Carvalho for the presidency in 1976, and later being the founder and promoter of the Unitary Organization of Workers (OUT) in whose first Congress in April 1978 participated other political parties with close links with terrorist groups, such as: ETA (Spain), Autonomia Operaia (Italy), Polisario Front (Sahrawi Arab Democratic Republic); and the Popular Front for the Liberation of Oman.

In 1978 the bomb attack of a freight train in Mauritania, which caused the death of eight soldiers opened a series of internal discussions and disputes inside the BR. The attack was claimed by the Polisario Front but it, organised by the Algerian Secret Services and carried out with the help of some BR militants. This was the first BR action intentionally meant to cause deaths. However at that time, most of its leaders were already in prison for bank robberies and denied knowledge of this action.

Despite direct lethal violence and planned assassinations were not supported, at least 3 assassinations occurred as a consequence of cross fires with security forces like PSP or Policia Judiciária and the assassination of José Plácido, a former member who had decided to abandon the PRP/BR and cooperate with the law. Isabel do Carmo and Carlos Antunes, both in jail, not only denied any involvement and criticized the crime.

Within the BR the issue of the use of lethal violence and killings was something that had always been on the table and over time some militants rebelled against the narratives of restraint that were defended mainly by Isabel do Carmo and Carlos Antunes. After 1978, with the arrest of the majority of BR leadership, including Isabel do Carmo and Carlos Antunes, proved decisive for the more radical faction inside the BR to move to deliberate killings. Some of its members led by Pedro Goulart ended up engaging into lethal violence joining Forças Populares 25 de Abril (FP-25), a terrorist organization created and led by Otelo Saraiva de Carvalho. that used lethal violence as part of its methods and intimidation strategy.

The BR ended up being extinguished in 1980, due to internal disputes and the imprisonment of several members, including the leaders, Carlos Antunes and Isabel do Carmo, arrested on charges of bank robberies and bombings. Most of its members, including Pedro Goulart ended up joining Forças Populares 25 de Abril the far-left terrorist group.

== See also ==
- Forças Populares 25 de Abril
- Isabel do Carmo
- Carlos Antunes
- Otelo Saraiva de Carvalho

== Sources ==
- Albright, David (2019). Communism And Political Systems In Western Europe. Routledge. ISBN 9780367167882.
- Ângelo, Fernando Cavaleiro (2021). DINFO : A queda do último serviço secreto militar (in Portuguese). Alfragide: Casa das Letras. ISBN 9789896608163.
- Da Silva, R.; Ferreira, A. S. (2020). "From the armed struggle against the dictatorship to the socialist revolution: the narrative restraints to lethal violence among radical left organisations in Portugal". Perspectives on Terrorism (6). Institute of Security and Global Affairs (ISGA) of Leiden University’s: 139–151. ISSN 2334-3745.
- Costa, Fátima (2008). Políticas de combate ao terrorismo: segurança colectiva versus direitos individuais (MSc). Portuguese Military Academy.
- Ferreira, Ana (2015). Luta Armada em Portugal (1970-1974) (PDF) (PhD). Universidade Nova de Lisboa.
- Harsgor, Michael (1976). Portugal in revolution. Beverly Hills, Calif.: Sage Publications. ISBN 9780803906471.
- Schmid, Alex P. (1988). Political terrorism : a new guide to actors and authors, data bases, and literature (Expanded and updated ed.). New Brunswick, N.J.: Transaction Publishers. p. 654. ISBN 9781412815666.
- Gobern Lopes, Luís (November 3, 2022). "Iam preparados para disparar e matar? "Claro". As confissões de um ex-FP 25" (Both paper and eformat) (Interview) (in Portuguese). Interviewed by António José Vilela, Maria Henrique Espada. Revista Sábado.
