= Força de Unidade Popular =

Popular Unity Force Força de Unidade Popular
- Leader: Otelo Saraiva de Carvalho
- Founded: 28 March 1980
- Dissolved: 31 March 2004
- Armed wing: Forças Populares 25 de Abril (1980–1987)
- Ideology: Marxism; Revolutionary socialism Otelismo
- Political position: Far-left

The Popular Unity Force (Portuguese: Força de Unidade Popular, FUP) was a Portuguese political party, founded in 1980 and dissolved in 2004.

The party was founded by Otelo Saraiva de Carvalho "to promote popular unity among the Portuguese people for the construction of Socialism" and "to practice solidarity with all the peoples of the world who struggle for their liberation and by Socialism."

In 1980, Otelo was a candidate in the Portuguese presidential elections. Otelo finished in third in the elections with 85,896 (1.4%) votes.
