= Otelo Saraiva de Carvalho =

Portuguese military officer and politician (1936–2021)

Otelo Saraiva de Carvalho MSMM • GCL • MPCE
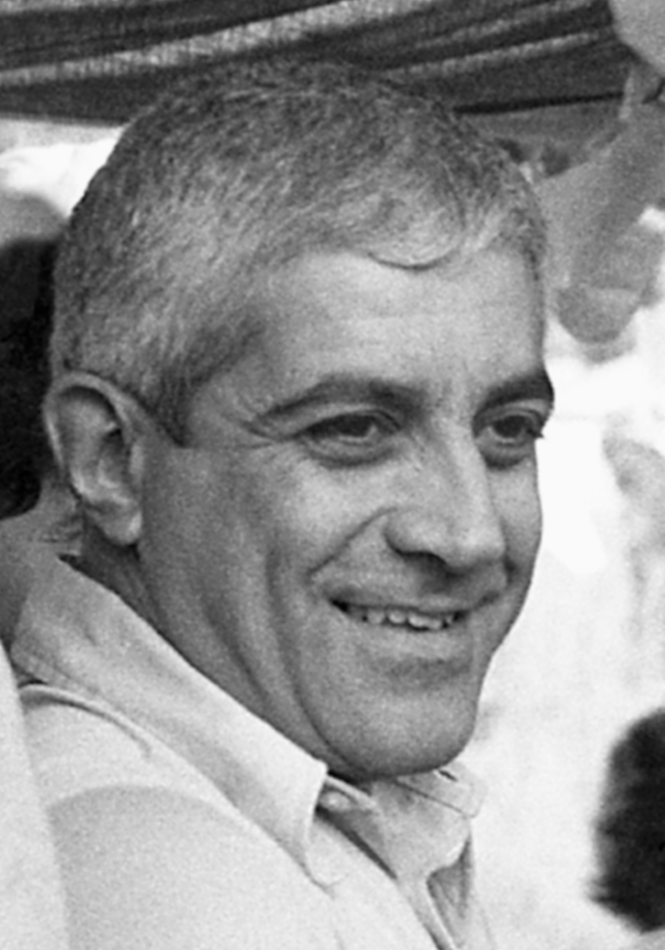
- Otelo in 1976
- Born: 31 August 1936; Lourenço Marques, Mozambique
- Died: 25 July 2021 (aged 84); Lisbon, Portugal
- Military career
- Allegiance: Portugal
- Branch: Portuguese Army: COPCON
- Service years: 1955–1984
- Rank: Colonel
- Nickname: Otelo
- Conflicts: Portuguese Colonial War; Angolan War of Independence; Guinea-Bissau War of Independence; Carnation Revolution
- Awards: Grand Cross of the Order of Liberty
- Other work: Candidate for President of Portugal

Otelo Nuno Romão Saraiva de Carvalho, GCL (Portuguese pronunciation: [ɔˈtɛlu sɐˈɾajvɐ ðɨ kɐɾˈvaʎu]; 31 August 1936 – 25 July 2021) was a Portuguese military officer and revolutionary. He was the chief strategist of the 1974 Carnation Revolution, he was a key figure during the Ongoing Revolutionary Process (PREC) and later became accused of being a militant leader.

The Movement of Armed Forces (MFA) started with the Portuguese military serving in Portuguese Guinea including Otelo to gather hundreds of officials. The military coup against the 48 year old dictatorship was being prepared in Lisbon, but the coordinator was deployed to Azores by Estado Novo. Otelo stepped in as chief strategist. From the evening of 24 April 1974 to 26 April, he and his colleagues coordinated the military coup, which gathered strong popular support.

After the Revolution, Otelo assumed an influential role as the head of military defense force COPCON, alongside Portuguese Provisional Governments Prime-minister Vasco Gonçalves and President Francisco da Costa Gomes. His military force supported workers' claims against rural landowners, urban landlords, and employers, in contrast to the previous protection of Estado Novo to the latter. After 25 November 1975, he would be dismissed from his role.

In 1976, as a politician Otelo ran in the first Portuguese presidential election, in which he placed second with the base of his support coming from the far-left. The third would be José Pinheiro de Azevedo, Admiral and former provisional prime-minister, and Octávio Pato, candidate for the Communist Party. The winning candidate would be António Ramalho Eanes, also a military, that would win over Otelo again in December, 1980.

By then, Otelo had founded a new political party to work as an electoral front joining various political organisations in 1980: Força de Unidade Popular (FUP). The signature was filmed by the National Portuguese Television. However, FUP would be accused of being a political front for Forças Populares 25 de Abril and Otelo the leader of everything. He was tried and sentenced at lower courts, but the Constitutional Court reverted the sentence due to unconstitutionality.

To solve the impasse, the Portuguese Parliament voted an amnesty for political crimes in 1996 as there was no perspective of juridical solution in "useful time". Besides this reasoning, the amnesty was promoted by President Mário Soares as a gesture of democratic reconciliation as it erased the political crimes by far left and far right. He was further trialled for the assassinations, but was acquitted in 2001 and 2003.

Thousands of persons paid respect at his funeral in 2021, including the president Marcelo Rebelo de Sousa, the prime-minister António Costa and the president of the parliament Eduardo Ferro Rodrigues. At the time, the parliament highlighted his role in April 1974 as a "liberator of Portugal" given his major role in the preparation of the Carnation Revolution. (Note: Otelo had already been the subject of contentious debates in parliament, in earlier years. At the time of his death, the mourning statement was given to the "hero of April", with caviats alluding to his following growingly controversial and infamous actions. "Not unknown are the various moments in Otelo's life that made him a contradictory character, divisive and non-consensual, at the time of his disappearance it's the duty, above all, of the ASSEMBLY OF THE REPUBLIC, to pay homage to the hero of April (...)".)

== Early life ==
Otelo Saraiva de Carvalho was born in Lourenço Marques, Portuguese Mozambique (now Maputo, Mozambique) on 31 August 1936, to a Portuguese father, Eduardo Saraiva de Carvalho, and a Goan mother, Fernanda Aurea Pegado Romao, who was born in Goa, Portuguese India. Named by his theatre-minded parents after Shakespeare's Othello, he completed his secondary education at a state school in Lourenço Marques. His father was a civil servant and his mother a railway clerk. He entered the Military Academy in Lisbon in 1955, at the age of nineteen.

On 5 November 1960, he married Maria Dina Afonso Alambre with whom he had two daughters and a son.

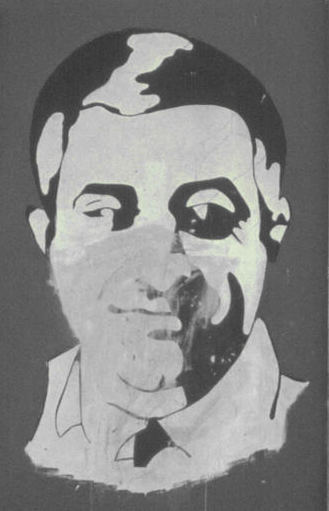
A street mural of Otelo, Lisbon, Portugal 1975

Otelo spent many years in the colonial wars in Africa. He served in Portuguese Angola from 1961 to 1963 as a second lieutenant, and as a captain from 1965 to 1967. He was posted to Portuguese Guinea in 1970 as a captain, under General António de Spínola, in charge of civilian affairs and the propaganda campaign Hearts and Minds.

In 1970, Otelo attended the funeral of António de Oliveira Salazar, the Prime Minister of Portugal from 1932 to 1968. At the funeral, Otelo was seen weeping over the casket of Salazar.

== Carnation Revolution ==
Portuguese overseas territories in Africa during the Estado Novo regime: Angola and Mozambique were by far the two largest of those territories.

Otelo joined the underground Movement of Armed Forces (MFA), which carried out a coup d'état in Lisbon on 25 April 1974, in which he played a directing role.

The movement of captains (MFA) started with the Portuguese military serving in Portuguese Guinea, the hardest war scenario in the Portuguese colonial war. Soon, the movement gathered hundreds of officials. The military coup was being prepared against the 48 year old dictatorship, but Vasco Lourenço, one of the coordinators, was deployed to Azores by Estado Novo, hoping to diffuse the plot.

Otelo, also involved from the beginning, stepped in as chief strategist. From the evening of 24 April 1974 to 26 April, he and his colleagues coordinated the military coup from the outskirts of Lisbon, in Pontinha. The military coup gathered strong popular support.

== Ongoing Revolutionary Process (PREC) ==
In July 1974, Otelo was made a brigadier and placed in command of the special military Command for the Continent COPCON, which was set up to secure order in the country and to promote the revolutionary process. In 1975, infighting in the MFA intensified with Otelo representing the left wing of the movement. After the Carnation Revolution, the tension In between communist and noncommunist forces started to increase as MFA was deeply turning left as a consequence of communist party and the extreme left forces were becoming more intervening.

On his attempt to revert President António de Spínola tried to actively intervene appealing to «silent majority» against the political radicalization that was being lived to. On 28 September, He tried to convene a large popular demonstration in Lisbon that aimed to thwart the movement and show to the loss of influence of moderate forces. After the failure of his movement, Spinola resigned, and Costa Gomes was nominee for the role.

However, MFA soldiers and left-wing parties, led by the PCP, blocked access to Lisbon the previous morning, with barricades at various points. The atmosphere was close to civil war and at the end of the day Otelo, then commander of COPCON, announced: "The Armed Forces Movement is in complete control of the situation."

A right-wing putsch attempt, led by António de Spínola, was thwarted by the timely intervention of COPCON in March 1975. Otelo became part of the Council of the Revolution which was created on 14 March 1975. In May 1975 he was temporarily promoted to General and, together with Francisco da Costa Gomes and Vasco Gonçalves, formed the Directório (Directorate).

The prime Minister Vasco Gonçalves decreed "victory over reaction" and the country would live another troubled reddish year. In a memo to American President Gerald Ford, Henry Kissinger states that "perhaps the most important lesson from the Portuguese weekend's events is the close coordination between MFA and the Communist Party. Between them their control of the situation was so complete that in all practical respects the country was in their hands" Kissinger wrote to the President.

In July 1975, Otelo visited Cuba with a delegation of Portuguese military officers to meet Fidel Castro. Otelo participated in the Cuban 26 of July celebrations with Castro. During this trip, Castro informed Otelo of his intention to send Cuban troops to Angola to support MPLA. In response, Otelo assured Castro that the Portuguese government would have no objection to the involvement of Cuba there.

The period In between 11 March and 25 November was later called the "Hot Summer of 1975" due to the number of clashes and force measurement between communist and non communists.

Costa Gomes, aligned with the communist party Otelo's success led to his being named the commander of the newly created Continente Operational Command (Comando Operacional do Continente - COPCON) for Lisbon Region. Created in July 1974 by President António Spínola to enforce the MFA program, COPCON brought together soldiers from the various branches of the armed forces and was composed of two divisions: one for Information and the other for operations.

This was a troubled period, with major social and political upheavals, clashes between the military and the emergence of various extreme leftist movements. Otelo told in an interview that, at that time, various social problems began to appear at COPCON, with workers seeing their bosses flee and becoming unemployed, for example. Then they began to receive rural workers who were unhappy with the agrarian reform. All sorts of problems came.

At the head of COPCON, Otelo begins to make controversial decisions. Among these controversial measures are the blank arrest warrants, without the intervention of the judiciary, which Otelo signed and which were later executed by his subordinates, often during the night without the victims even knowing why they were being detained.

In an interview he gave and in response to whether COPCON was concerned about the advance of counter-revolutionary forces, which were assaulting, destroying, burning down the headquarters of left-wing parties, the Communist Party, the MDP, and other left-wing parties, Otelo says a phrase that would also become famous for its controversy: "Look, we are, in fact, very worried. This is growing very fast, and I hope we don't have to put the counter-revolutionaries in Campo Pequeno before they put us there".

On 25 November 1975, an extreme left-wing coup was attempted. Those who took part in the attempt were members of the MFA, the Portuguese Army Commandos, and COPCON. The coup, orchestrated by Otelo, failed to take control of the Portuguese government. Because of this failure, Otelo was imprisoned, COPCON was disbanded, and António Ramalho Eanes rose to power. As punishment for participation in the coup, Otelo was imprisoned for three months.

== 1976 presidential campaign and following years ==
In 1976, Otelo ran unsuccessfully for president against Eanes. Throughout his campaign, Otelo advocated for socialism, national independence, and popular power. Otelo's support came from the Portuguese working class, specifically in Setúbal and Alentejo. A notable supporter and organizer of Otelo's campaign was Zeca Afonso, a popular Portuguese revolutionary songwriter. Otelo finished second in the election, with 792,760 votes (16.46%) and António Ramalho Eanes was elected president with 61.59%.

Still in the second half of the 70s, Otelo actively participated in the creation of the GDUP (Grupos Dinamizadores de Unidade Popular) popular action groups, similar to what Otelo had seen in Cuba. GDUP grew throughout the country, fueled by Otelo's run for Presidency of the Republic. The majority of members were in favor of armed struggle as a political weapon.

From the success from the presidential election, the Unitary Organization of Workers (OUT) emerged in April 1978, having Otelo as one of its first supporters and promoter's. Because OUT did not identify itself with the new parliamentary democratic regime, which emerged on 25 November 1975, it didn't constitute itself as a political party. Instead, it was only a political association. Among the approved motions, in the first OUT congress, in Marinha Grande, the defense of violence as a political weapon stands out: «people's power will only be possible (...) through the recourse (...) to armed revolutionary violence» and it can only be a reality. ...if the workers are armed, constituting a (...) people's army", and "Only with violence (...) is it possible for the people to conquer political power."

Most OUT structure and leadership was filled by PRP-BR leaders, a party that shared some of its headquarters, allowing Otelo, who despite his military condition was entitled to be considered a permanent guest, to be present at the meetings, although without any voting rights. Less than two months after the aforementioned OUT congress, PRP-BR main leaders Isabel do Carmo and Carlos Antunes were arrested. During the same police operation, a Judiciary Police agent was killed.

With Isabel do Carmo and Carlos Antunes imprisonment and the consequent power vacuum on PRP-BR leadership, a rupture was generated between them, who advocated this was not the time to develop OUT project and the other militants, led by Pedro Goulart, who defended greater violence, namely assassinations, in an attempt to radicalize the armed struggle. That later was materialized in the Projecto Global/FUP/FP-25 de Abril.

Meanwhile, Otelo was penalized by the Superior Council of Discipline of the Army with the consequent passage to the situation of compulsory reserve, for having an active participation in politics, incompatible with his military status.

== 1980 presidential campaign ==
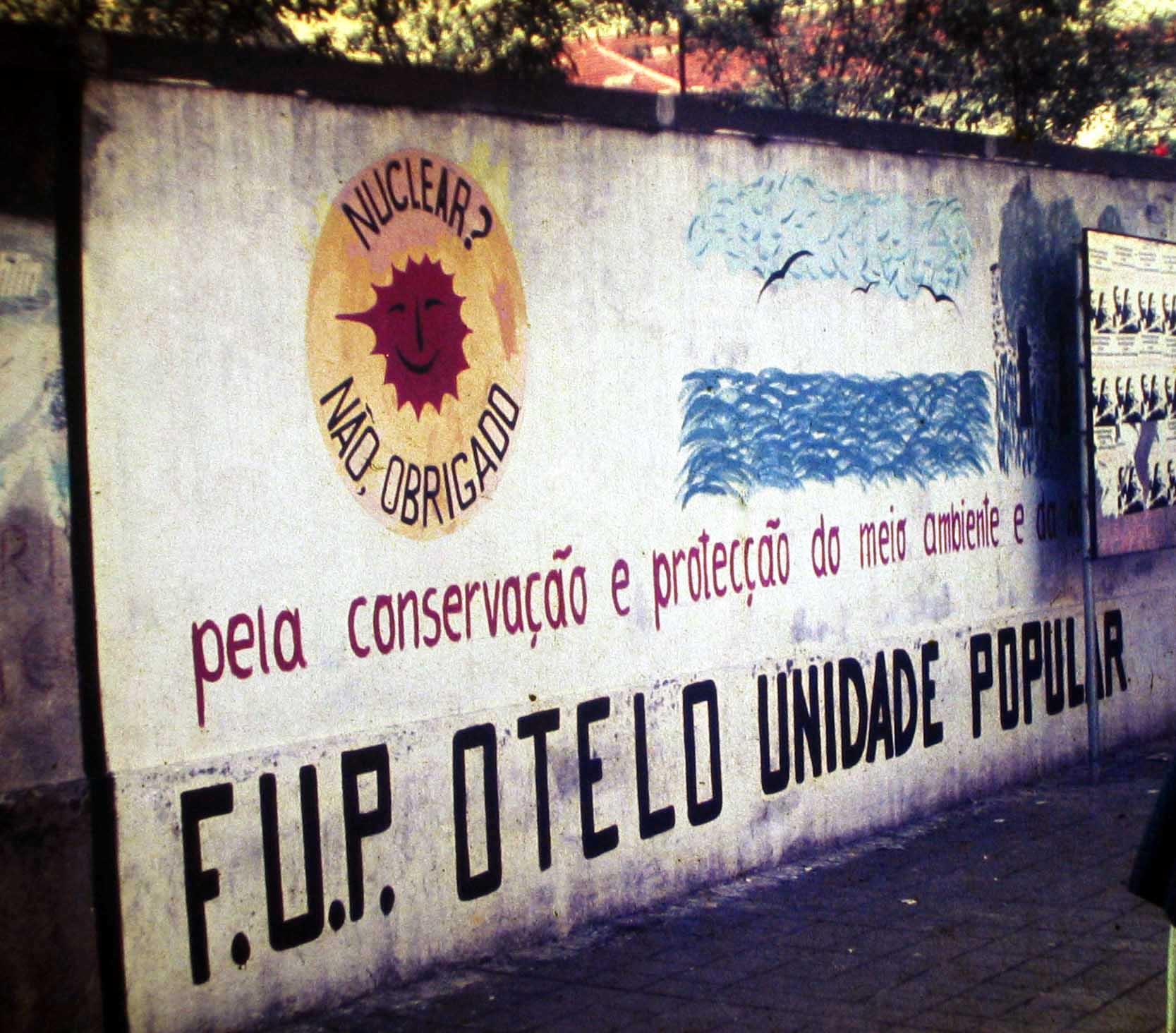
Political graffiti in support of Otelo's 1980 presidential campaign. The text reads "FUP Otelo - Popular Unity - 1980"

In 1980, Otelo was a candidate in the Portuguese presidential elections. He was nominated for the presidential race by the far-left political party which he was one of the founders of, Força de Unidade Popular (FUP). He continued to base his campaign upon building socialism in Portugal. Once again, Otelo received support and advice from Portuguese musician José Afonso throughout the campaign. This time, Otelo did not fare nearly as well as he had done four years beforehand. He finished a poor third, with 85,896 votes (1.4%). After the election, Otelo confessed that he voted for his rival Eanes in the election, "to avoid the victory of the right-wing candidate Soares Carneiro".

== FUP/FP 25 de abril: imprisonment and release ==
=== Accusations of terrorism ===
After the defeat in the presidential elections, Otelo Saraiva de Carvalho, together with Pedro Goulart and Mouta Liz, founded the Global Project (Projeto Global). It, "...aimed, among others, to create conditions that would allow its members, in the long term and through the armed insurrection, to seize the State and install popular power through the institutionalization of what they called direct and grassroots democracy and subvert the functioning of the institutions of the State enshrined in the Constitution, as this is one of the adequate conditions for the aforementioned armed insurrection...". The initiative united the most radical factions of the revolutionary far-left, who opposed the establishment of a party-based parliamentary representative system and the restoration of a capitalist economic and social order. This was a superstructure without legal existence comprised several components:

- Mass Political Organization: legal component constituted by a legal political party, the Popular Unity Force (FUP);
- Armed Civilian Structure (Estrutura Civil Armada/ECA), corresponding to the terrorist group Forças Populares 25 de Abril (FP-25), responsible for the assaults, bombings, and murders.
- Military headquarters, led by Otelo and aimed recruiting military personnel for the project, operated in the background and was intended to provide support for the insurrection when called upon.
- OSCAR, which was none than Otelo himself and which sought to capitalize on his high awareness, seeking to attract elements of civil society to the project.

The Global Project (Projecto Global) coordinated the clandestine and subversive component of the terrorist group FP-25, using armed violence as a political weapon, and the political party FUP, which gave it political and legal coverage. The distinction between the FUP and the FP-25 was similar to the one existing in Northern Ireland between Sinn Féin and the IRA or in Spain between Herri Batasuna and ETA.

Global Project's first step was the creation of a political party – FUP/Força de Unidade Popular (Popular Unity Force) on 28 March 1980, two months after Otelo's defeats in the 1980 presidential elections and less than one month before the first attacks by FP-25. FUP, despite inheriting part of the physical and human structures of the former PRP/BR, the party from which most of the operatives came, never came to run for any legislative or municipal elections.

On 20 April 1980, five days before the Carnation Revolution anniversary, FP-25 de Abril initiated its activity with dozens of firecrakers/low powerful explosive devices across the country. Along with the initial announcement was a document named "Manifesto ao Povo Trabalhador", mentioning serious deviations from the 1976 Constitution, namely the abandonment of socialism, the reversal of the land ownership nationalization ("Reforma Agrária") and the loss of the people's decision-making process.

Forças Populares 25 de Abril allegedly killed 12-14 persons in several attacks. The deaths were either by (1) targeting managers who were considered to harm workers (mass firings, delayed wages) or who was considered to attack the organisation, including the General Director of Prison Service ; (2) accidental deaths mostly related to confrontations with security forces (GNR and PJ), but also including a four-month-old baby. Five militants also died. The violence was partially stopped in June 1984, with a police operation codenamed "Orion", which resulted in the arrest of most of its leaders and operatives. They were later tried in October 1986".

=== Arrest and preventive detention ===
On 20 June 1984, Otelo was arrested on charges of being a Forças Populares 25 de Abril founding member and leader. During "Orion" police operation, various incriminating documents were seized at FUP headquarters, as well as at Otelo 's residence. Among the seized documents were the two notebooks handwritten by Otelo, one green and one red, containing detailed reports of operations and meetings, including the infamous Conclave meeting in Serra da Estrela. Cândida Almeida, prosecutor in the trial recalls one of the most famous meetings, held in Serra da Estrela where everyone was hooded, Otelo had the number seven. Today it would be possible to do the DNA of the hood, but Otelo also never denied that he had been there.

At the Conclave, a discussion was held regarding future strategy, one of its most important documents was nº 16. It's a guideline for violence defining who and how should be carried out the robberies and homicides, Otelo has written with his hand that he was content to know what the profile of the individual to be slaughtered. He and others in the military-political leadership were fully aware of the actions being carried out, making them moral authors of these acts. Those handwritten notebooks by Otelo are part of the case file and were reproduced in several books alluding to the process. Otelo himself acknowledges having been present with a hood at the Conclave meeting, held in Serra da Estrela. According to him, in an interview with Expresso newspaper, it would have been a requirement of the ECA (Armed Civilian Structure), known as Forças Populares 25 de Abril.

Usually, Otelo recorded in his personal notebook everything that was said at the meetings of Political-Military Board Projecto Global (FP-25) identifying all the people present by abbreviations and very enlightening and detailing everything that had been said by each of the authors. Otelo's notebooks were, in fact, responsible for incriminating him as well as many of the detainees, as well as clarifying many of the organization's actions. At the hearings, in addition to confessing almost the entirety of the facts, Otelo was unable to provide the least plausible explanation for the crimes he was accused of and it turned out that they were not only false accusations that supported the accusation, but a source of evidence, in which his manuscript stands out, where everything is reported with acronyms and names, which he was unveiled during the hearings.

=== Judgment and amnesty on political offences ===
In October 1985, Otelo was tried and convicted in court for his role in leading the FP 25 de Abril and sentenced to 15 years in prison. The sentence would be confirmed by the Court of Appeal, which increased the sentence to 18 years and later the Supreme Court of Justice would fix it at 17 years in prison.

He would appeal the sentence to the Constitutional Court, which would rule the sentence unconstitutional twice (1989 and 1996) and leave the process at a legal impasse. The Constitutional Court reverted the sentence due to unconstitutionality, as the newly formed body to comply with EU regulations did not agree with the other courts interpretation of the legal code in face of the new constitution, and wanted a full retrial by the same judges. As the period of preventive detention had expired, since the sentence had not yet become final, following European pressure he was released on 17 May 1989, after five years in prison awaiting trial. He was also demoted to lieutenant-colonel.

To solve the impasse, the President, Mario Soares, tried to pursue a political solution. The Portuguese Parliament approved an amnesty "for politically motivated offenses" justified as there was no perspective of juridical solution in "useful time", in adherence to Portugal's statute of limitations. Besides this reasoning, the amnesty was promoted by President Mário Soares as a gesture of democratic reconciliation as it erased the political crimes by far left and far right. The amnesty covered "politically motivated offenses" committed between 27 July 1976 and 21 June 1991”, including the offenses committed by the FP 25 de Abril, but also the right wing organisations such as Democratic Movement for the Liberation of Portugal (MDLP). This followed an earlier amnesty that covered offences until 1976 and the pardon in 1991 to the right-wing MDLP operationals such as Ramiro Moreira that had been sentenced to 20 years. pt:Movimento Democrático de Libertação de Portugal The parliament being of left wing majority, supported by the socialist PS and the communist party PCP, was relevant to its approval.

For the approval of the amnesty, the parliament justified that "the legal complexity has made extremely difficult its legal solution. (…) with developments that do not presume the possibility of a just solution in reasonable time." Relevant to note that amnesty is not equivalent to pardon, as it applies to whom has not been convicted, forgetting eventual committed crimes. Not covered by the amnesty were the so-called "blood crimes".

=== Judgement and acquittal on blood crimes ===
He was further trialled for the assassinations, but was acquitted in 2001 and 2003.

The various crimes committed and spread across the various districts are unified in a single process. FP-25 alleged members were accused of 10-14 murders. There are more than 150 accusations, two of which 10 completed homicides and 7 attempted, to be judged. It is from here that process 396/91 is created, which will bring together the judgment of blood crimes, which took place later and had the sentence handed down on April 6, 2001, and confirmed by the Lisbon Court of Appeal in June 2003. By the time of the trial, almost 20 years had passed since some crimes, the repentant were in Brazil or Mozambique and the defendants opted for silence.

Even so, evidence was produced in relation to the crime of terrorist association, which was not being tried and which had already been amnestied. The judge in charge claimed that it was certain that the terrorist FP-25 group had committed the attacks, but not enough admissible proofs indicated who were the individual authors of the crimes for individual convictions. (Note: Despite the confessions and accusations made by the "repented" collaborationists of the group. These were, by self-incrimination, the only condemned.)

In the end of the 2001 and 2003 trials, Otelo got a verdict of not guilty. In the words of an emeritus Supreme Court President: "He was aquitted because nothing was proved against him"

Even with the possibility of appealing to the Supreme Court of Justice, the Public Prosecutor's Office allowed the appeal period to pass when it had committed to the repentant ones to fight until the last instance for their exemptions from punishment. This led the Attorney General's Office to launch an inquiry to determine responsibilities. A prosecutor was held responsible for having been responsible for this prescription.

== Later life and death ==
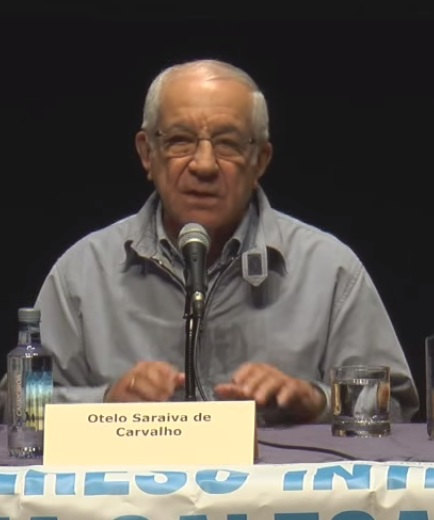
Otelo Saraiva de Carvalho in 2014

While imprisoned for his involvement with FP-25, Otelo met Maria Filomena Morais and began a ménage à trois with her and his wife Maria Dina Afonso Alambre, spending Monday to Thursday with Filomena and from Friday to Sunday with Dina.

Otelo retired from military service and public life in 1989. Following his retirement, Otelo remained a political activist and was featured in multiple documentaries about the Carnation Revolution.

In 2011, during the Portuguese financial crisis when the country was nearing the end of the center-left government of José Socrates and had to request international financial assistance, Otelo stated that he wouldn't have started the revolution if he had known what the country would become after it. He also stated that the country would need a man as honest as Salazar to deal with the crisis, but from a non-fascist perspective.

In March 2020, he was hospitalized in Lisbon for heart failure. On 10 July 2021, Otelo was hospitalized again, at Army Hospital, in Lisbon. Otelo died fifteen days later on 25 July, aged 84.

== Influence ==
Otelo is still an icon for activists of the left in Portugal, but is hated by many right-wingers who consider him a terrorist who tried to seize power in the country in order to become Portugal's Fidel Castro.

In 1983, he was decorated by President Eanes.

In 2006, Otelo was voted the 68th greatest Portuguese in the Os Grandes Portugueses competition.

At his funeral, thousands of people went to show appreciation for Otelo. Also the major institutions in Portugal were represented. This includes the president Marcelo Rebelo de Sousa, the prime-minister António Costa and the then president of the parliament Eduardo Ferro Rodrigues. The parliament approved a motion that highlighted his role as a "liberator of Portugal" referring to his role as operational mastermind of the Carnation revolution.

== Electoral history ==
=== Presidential election, 1976 ===
Ballot: 27 June 1976
Candidate	Votes	%
António Ramalho Eanes	2,967,137	61.6
Otelo Saraiva de Carvalho	792,760	16.5
José Pinheiro de Azevedo	692,147	14.4
Octávio Pato	365,586	7.6
Blank/Invalid ballots	63,495	–
Turnout	4,881,125	75.47
Source: Comissão Nacional de Eleições

=== Presidential election, 1980 ===
Ballot: 7 December 1980
Candidate	Votes	%
António Ramalho Eanes	3,262,520	56.4
António Soares Carneiro	2,325,481	40.2
Otelo Saraiva de Carvalho	85,896	1.5
Carlos Galvão de Melo	48,468	0.8
António Pires Veloso	45,132	0.8
António Aires Rodrigues	12,745	0.2
Blank/Invalid ballots	60,090	–
Turnout	5,840,332	84.39
Source: Comissão Nacional de Eleições

== Publications ==
- Cinco meses mudaram Portugal (1975)
- Contribuiçāo para uma alternativa popular à crise da economia em Portugal: texto de apoio da candidatura à Presidência da República de Otelo Saraiva de Carvalho (1976)
- Otelo: o povo é quem mais ordena (1977)
- Memorias de abril (1978)
- Alvorada em abril (1984)
- Presos por um Fio, Portugal e as FP-25 de Abril, de Nuno Gonçalo Poças, Casa das Letras, 4–2021, ISBN 9789896610333
- Viver e morrer em nome das FP-25, de António José Vilela, Casa das Letras, 6–2004, ISBN 972-46-1594-4
- "Caso FP-25 de Abril": Alegações do Ministério Público, Ministério da Justiça, 1987
