= Diana Theatre bombing =

1921 anarchist bomb attack in Milan, Italy

Coordinates: 45.4739°N 9.2067°E

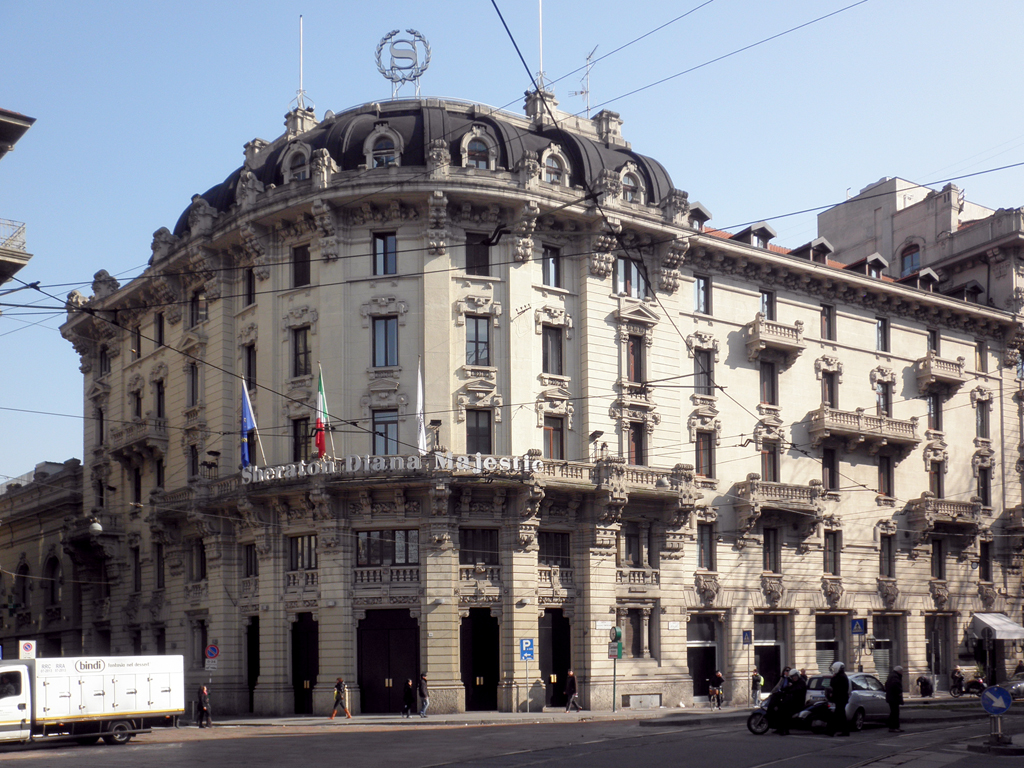
Diana Theatre (now the Hotel Sheraton Diana Majestic), in 2011

The Diana Theatre bombing was an anarchist bomb attack on the Diana Theatre in Milan, Italy, on 23 March 1921, that caused 21 deaths and 172 injuries.

== Background ==
Following World War I, a group of anarcho-individualists formed in Milan. They carried out a series of attacks targeting public officials, industrialists, and establishments in the city centre frequented by Milan's high society and upper-middle class. There was an attempted bomb attack on a reastaurant on 7 September 7 1919 by the anarchist Bruno Filippi, who was killed in the explosion. On 25 June 1920, a hand grenade was thrown through the windows of the Pasticceria Cova, killing an army captain. A second bomb was thrown at the same establishment on 7 August, injuring three.

In October 1920, Errico Malatesta, the leader of the Italian anarchist movement, was arrested and imprisoned in San Vittore. With no trial date being set, on 18 March 18 1921, Malatesta and two other imprisoned anarchists announced a hunger strike. A small group of anarcho-individualists decided to carry out a series of attacks to protest Malatesta's detention, even though he had never supported the concept of propaganda of the deed or dynamite attacks.

== Bombing ==
The group decided to attack the Diana Theatre, a prestigious venue frequented by Milan's bourgeoisie. They hoped to kill the police chief. On the evening of 23 March, 160 nitroglycerin sticks, covered with straw and empty bottles, were placed in a basket. This was then placed near the artists' entrance.

At 10:40 PM, the large audience took their seats. The bomb exploded, shattering the masonry and hitting the front rows of spectators and the orchestra pit. 172 people were injured, with 21 deaths, including 9 musicians.

== Consequences ==
The attack caused outrage. Errico Malatesta denounced the bombing and suspended his hunger strike.

Fascist Squadrismo ransacked the offices of anarchist newspapers Avanti! and Umanità Nova.

The anarchist Antonio Pietropaolo was soon arrested. Further arrests followed. However, some suspects, like Pietro Bruzzi, managed to escape and flee abroad.

The trial against the anarchist attackers, who were defended by the lawyer Francesco Rèpaci, began on 9 May 1922. The main culprits were identified as Ettore Aguggini, aged 19, from Bergamo, and Giuseppe Mariani, aged 23, and Giuseppe Boldrini, aged 28, from Mantua. They received life imprisonment. Sixteen other defendants were also sent to prison.

== Bibliography ==
- John Foot, Gli anni neri: ascesa e caduta del fascismo, Bari; Roma, Laterza, 2022.
- Giuseppe Mariani, Memorie di un ex-terrorista, Torino, 1953
- Vincenzo Mantovani, Mazurka blu. La strage del Diana, Rusconi, Milano, 1978
- Vincenzo Mantovani, Anarchici alla sbarra, Il Saggiatore, Milano, 2007
- Franco Tettamanti, "1921, bomba anarchica al «Diana» Strage in platea, morti 21 spettatori", Corriere della Sera, 21 June 2006, p. 9
