= Forças Populares 25 de Abril =

Portuguese far-left terrorist group

Popular Forces 25 April
- Forças Populares 25 de Abril
- Leader: Otelo Saraiva de Carvalho
- Dates active: 1980–1987
- Allegiance: Força de Unidade Popular
- Active regions: Portugal
- Ideology: Communism; Revolutionary socialism
- Political position: Far-left
- Status: Defunct

The Forças Populares 25 de Abril (English: Popular Forces 25 April; FP 25 de Abril or FP-25) was a far-left militant political organization operating in Portugal between 1980 and 1987, having been allegedly led by Otelo Saraiva de Carvalho. At the end of the judicial process known as "FUP/FP-25", Otelo and other accused members were amnestied of moral authorship and were found innocent of material authorship.

Between 1980 and 1987, the organisation FP-25 was directly responsible for 12 to 14 deaths. Half were planned targets, mostly businessmen or managers involved in labour conflicts or retaliation of the organisation against who harmed members of the organisation. The other half were non-intended targets, mostly members of the police forces, and a few civilians, including that of a child. There are also 6 deaths of its members. These followed dozens of shootings, attacks with explosives, and bank robberies.

The Orion operation (1984) led to the temporary arrest of more than 70 people, in what became known as the FUP/FP-25 process. The most famous members included Otelo Saraiva de Carvalho, José Mouta Liz and Pedro Goulart, among others. These three in specific stressed to belong exclusively to the political party Força de Unidade Popular (FUP). The defendants were later accused and charged in court for being a part of a terrorist organization, but the initial sentence would be partially annulled for unconstitutionality twice in 1989 and 1996.

After 12 years, in 1996, the left-centre parliamentary majority, made up by the Socialist Party and the Portuguese Communist Party, approved an amnesty for everyone involved in the eventual crime of terrorist association (moral authorship), due to the "juridic complexity (...) that doesn't herald the possibility of a solution of justice in reasonable time." The amnesty also ends up involving right-wing and left-wing organizations, approved in 1996 with the support of the President Mário Soares. It follows the previous experience of amnesty in 1979 or the pardon signed by the PM Aníbal Cavaco Silva for the fugitive Ramiro Moreira in 1991, right-wing member of the MDLP (Democratic Movement of Liberation of Portugal), sentenced to 20 years in prison for blood crimes or the non-accusation of António de Spínola, self-assumed leader of MDLP.

For the blood crimes (material authorship), after two not guilty sentences in 2001 and 2003, the Public Ministry did not appeal leading to the prescription of the sentences. The Emeritus Supreme Court President Noronha do Nascimento stated "Otelo was acquitted because nothing was proven against him".

== Context ==
=== Portugal ===
Cold war, colonial war and dictatorship mark the initial period. The opposition in Portugal radicalize in face of an oppressive regime that lasts for long 48 years, aligned with the western/capitalist block and in view of multiple international ideological influences. Oppositionists of left-leaning influence multiply and armed struggle organisations appear before the end of the dictatorship (LUAR; ARA; Brigadas Revolucionárias; PRP-BR).

After the fall of the dictatorship, on 25 April 1974, different views for the new regime enter in confrontation. After the 11 March 1975 and the failed extreme-right coup by António de Spínola, there is a left leaning trend. The revolutionary aspirations of part of the population with a strong presence in the streets is confronted with the 25 November 1975 and the attacks of the extreme right. Four organisations (Movimento Democrático de Libertação de Portugal - MDLP; Movimento Maria da Fonte; Exército de Libertação de Portugal - ELP; Comandos Operacionais de Defesa da Civilização Ocidental - CODECO) promote 566 violent actions from May 1975 onwards. These include 310 bombs, 136 assaults, 58 fires, 36 beatings, 16 shot attacks, 10 stonings, leading to several deaths. In the meantime, the 1976 legislative elections turn to the centre.

The attacks and assassinations of union leaders, left wing activists by these four extreme-right organisations continue until 1979. These included attacks on political parties: Communist Party attacked 160 times, MDP/CDE attacked 53 times and other left parties 48 times. Other 40 attacks targeted information culture like cooperatives, bookshops and tipographies. They bombed the Cuban embassy and the new African countries. In the meantime, there are reports of rural workers killed or demonstrators injured or killed by the police to "restore the order". Worker collective layoffs, oil shocks (1973 and 1978) and the austerity associated with the entrance of IMF (1979 and 1983) are unwelcomed. "The armed struggle would be necessary for a socialist revolution".

=== World ===
During the 1960s and 1970s, the armed struggle movements multiply with variations in the motivations and modus operandi.

In the west, the extreme left is present in many countries: Belgium (Communist Combatant Cells); France (Action Directe - 1970s and 1980s), Germany (Red Army Fraction - RAF), Italy (Red Brigades), Northern Ireland (Irish Republican Army - IRA), Spain (Euskadi Ta Askatasuna - ETA), USA (Weather Underground), among others.

In the other opposing political specturm, the extreme right had also competing movements such as: France (Charles Martel Group - 1970s-1990s), Northern Ireland (Ulster Volunteer Force - UVF; Ulster Defence Association - UDA), Spain (Warriors of Christ the King - 1970s; GAL - 1980s). For the US, a study by CATO Institute states the majority of the politically motivated killings since 1975 are from the right (391 vs. 65).

In Latin America, the response to dictatorship or very imperfect democracies have led to several armed struggle movements such as in Brazil (Ação Libertadora Nacional - ALN led by Carlos Marighella; Movimento Revolucionário 8 de Outubro - MR-8 led by Carlos Lamarca; VAR-Palmares allegedly with Dilma Roussef), Colombia (FARC led by Manuel Marulanda Vélez; Movimiento 19 de Abril - M-19 with Gustavo Petro); Uruguai (Tupamaros, led by Raul Sendic with José Mujica).

=== The emergence of the political party Força de Unidade Popular (FUP) ===
FUP was an electoral platform gathering several parties of the Portuguese far left such as: MES - Movimento de Esquerda Socialista, OUT - Organização Unitária de Trabalhadores, PC(m-l)P - Partido Comunista (marxista-leninista) de Portugal, PC(R) - Partido Comunista (Reconstruído), PRP - Partido Revolucionário do Proletariado, UC - Unidade Comunista, UDP - União Democrática Popular and four independents. The Portuguese Public Broadcasting TV channel (RTP) broadcast the signing of the agreement on 28 March, 1980, where Otelo, Goulart and Mouta Liz are some of the representatives signing the agreement. Key personality at the presentation was Otelo Saraiva de Carvalho, that is public record. Four months later FUP became formalised at the Supreme court.

Otelo had been the chief strategist of the Portuguese carnation revolution in 1974 and, in 1976 Portugueses Presidential election, was voted second, convincing 792,760 votes (16.46%), ahead of the candidates from the right and from the Communist party. Otelo gathered many supporters, including Zeca Afonso, a folk song writer, among many others. Situated in the far left, these supported views of bottom-up popular democracy ("power to the people"), in contrast to the Communist Party, and non-alignment with Cold War blocs.

With the announcement of FP-25 appearance in April 1980 there was an internal discussion within the electoral platform on whether or not to demarcate FUP from FP-25. Given its revolutionary ideology, sharing the same enemies ("who represses workers") but being different organizations, part of the members did not see the need to demarcate and the others left the coalition. In July 1980, the maoist party MRPP (which will reach 0,66% of votes) files a lawsuit that impedes FUP of going for the 1976 Portuguese legislative elections.

Later, the district attorney acused FP-25 of being the armed arm, with FUP being the political arm of what was called projecto global. In contrast, Ramsey Clark, stated Projeto Global was a concept of organisations and actions that could protect or amplify democratic institutions. The Portuguese far left was fearful of a counterrevolution similar to Chile's Pinochet coup in 1973, and already attempted by General Spínola on 11 March 1975. Otelo got inspired in the ideas of Cornelius Castoriadis for Projeto Global. The issue of dispute was whether FP-25 corresponded to the armed arm (ECA), which Otelo always denied.

== The FP-25 organisation ==
=== Ideology ===
The FP-25 brought together the most radical sectors of the Portuguese radical left, who were growing discontent with the development of bourgeois democracy and capitalism in post-Carnation Revolution Portugal. In the organization's "Manifesto ao Povo Trabalhador" or "Manifesto to the Workers" released in April 1980, the organization outlined its opposition to amendments to the Portuguese Constitution of 1976, specifically the abandonment of socialism, the abandonment of agrarian land reforms or the perceived lack of expression of the will of the people.

Opposing the political realities of the time, the FP-25 proposed a model of popular democracy, based on popular assemblies: the so-called basismo ("basism") or conselhismo ("councelism"), similar to the Libyan or Cuban revolutions. It also defended the non-alignment with either side of the Cold War as a necessary condition to the implementation of socialism in Portugal.

The nature of the armed actions and terrorist attacks showed a preoccupation with different causes: political, economic, solidarity with other terrorist groups and support of FP-25 militants that had been arrested. Their selected violence was more targeted than the previous generalised violence from the extreme right.

=== Funding and external ties ===
In the financial sphere, the main source of financing were bank robberies, as well as companies and vehicles for transporting valuables, which they called "expropriation" or "recoveries of funds". Gradually there was political and media isolation, the FP-25 quickly created, among public opinion, the image of an organization committed to the practice of common delinquency trying to intimidate the population and conditioning political decisions, seeking to provoke an insurrection with the support of a militia or a people's army. The theft, in 1984, of 108,000,000 escudos (approximately €500,000, a clearly large amount at the time) of a van transporting valuable from the Bank of Portugal, right in the center of Lisbon. Nevertheless, several assaults happen, usually at the end of the month, in order to allow to collect money from salaries.

The FP-25 also tried to collaborate with other militant groups, namely the IRA and the ETA, the latter confirming that there was an exchange of weapons and technical know-how. In 1981, FP-25 received from ETA, Gama 2 explosives and two dozen FireBird pistols in exchange for G3 machine guns. Additionally, ETA came to harbor in the Basque Country, two FP-25 terrorists who needed to retreat. Some governments (especially Mozambique) also did grant some support, for instance giving sanctuary to militants escaping the Portuguese authorities.

=== Activities ===
Lethal violence use was discussed within FP-25 members, with long debates, namely whether if it was morally acceptable or politically effective in face of the unfair conditions of the daily life. There was 6-7 planned deaths, 6-7 accidental deaths, and 6 deaths of their own militants.

==== Planned targets ====
Until the organization's dissolution, the victims of the FP-25's "executions" are mostly small businessmen and administrators — typically associated with companies in difficult economic situation, with serious labor disputes, collective dismissal processes or delayment in paying wages. The idea was to punish these and dissuade others of doing the same, as the State was absent of action or even promoted those practices. It was only in late 1982 that the first execution took place — businessman Diamantino Monteiro Pereira. In his factory, the delayed wages led to several suicides by workers. Another manager, from Gelmar, had a track-record of bankruptcy manager and the State had often used him to close down enterprises.

The organisation also targeted perceived attacks or threats to their members. A businessman, Alexandre Souto, was attacked inside of the Lisbon International Fair as retaliation for the death of the militant arrested in a robbery at Souto own's commercial establishment. The reaction of the manager led to the militant's death and the organisation retaliated one year after. Former militants who had switched sides also became legitimate targets. José Manuel Barradas was an organization's dissident killed for his collaboration with the authorities, including joining police searches for militants.

Later, in February 1986, the most well-known assassination was of the Prison Services ‘General Manager, Gaspar Castelo-Branco — the only high-ranking official in the State hierarchy to be killed. Two diverging narratives emerge.

This was an action that was directly related to the conditions of detention of the defendants. They claimed the right to be considered political prisoners, with free movement in the prison, the possibility of meeting with external elements and direct access to the media. This condition was not granted to them, being treated as prisoners of common crime. However, some months later, following an escape by a group of ten defendants from the Lisbon Penitentiary, in September 1985, conditions were worsened, with limited circulation, an obligation to stay in cells and restrictions on communication abroad. The responsibility for this directive was attributed to Gaspar Castelo Branco and because of it he was murdered.

The prison conditions In Portugal are still referred today as "unimaginable", leading to complaints of Amnesty International and to the European court of Human Rights. Adding to those, the defendants complained of being subjected to 23 hours lock-down or were sent to far places from lawyers and families. In protest, they started a hunger strike in September 1984 that would go on for 38 days. It was called off, with an agreement with the Justice Department to comply with a specific regulation, but one week after that was ignored. Gaspar Castelo Branco had been nominated by the authoritarian Estado Novo as diretor of Limoeiro and Mónicas, both famous penitenciaries in Lisbon, in October 1966. His refusal of medical assistance to the defendants led to the doctors' resignation. This was a hot topic back then as 10 detainees of Irish Republican Army (IRA) had died under police custody during the famous Margaret Thatcher vs. Bobby Sands case. Further initiatives of the families and supporters of the detainees led to meetings with several official actors as the President, MPs, Justice Minister and religious leaders to ease the detainment conditions, but all initiatives shocked with the intransigent position of the General Director of Prisons. In the polarised society of the time, the next President Mário Soares will decline to decorate him, suggesting divergences regarding his actions.

==== Accidental killings and the own militants of the organisation ====
The first deaths officially claimed by the organization took place in May 1980 and mainly resulted from confrontations with elements of the security forces, during bank robberies or during police rides. Deaths included members from Guarda Nacional Republicana (GNR - countryside police) and Polícia Judiciária (PJ - research police). Others were also wounded.

In October of the same year, following a failed robbery of two bank branches, near Lisbon with gunfire where two militants and an innocent civilian were killed.

Nevertheless, the most shocking murder was the death of a 4 months baby, in a bomb attack that targeted his grandfather. The militants wrongly had classified him as a large landowner, but he was only a modest tenant.

==== Other targets ====
Although the focus on local targets, the group also attack both foreign companies, embassies or consulates. The most known, attacks are those carried out in 1980 against Chilean consulate, in 1981 against Banco do Brasil, British Airways and Royal British Club, also in 1981 against Air France and Lufthansa.

Notable attacks included the 1984 firing of four mortar rounds at the U.S. Embassy in Lisbon and the 1985 bombing of six NATO ships, including the USS Richard E. Byrd, also in Lisbon. The group carried out another attack in February 1985 which involved detonating eight incendiary bombs under cars belonging to West Germany Air Force personnel assigned to a Portuguese airbase outside Beja. The explosions injured one person and caused considerable damage.

Despite the fact that evidence of planning kidnapping actions has been found, the FP-25 never carried out kidnappings or extortion actions against businessmen or other economic agents, due to the anticipation of Operation Orion.

== Judgement and acquittal ==
=== Dismantling and Orion Operation ===
On 19 June, as part of the largest police operation ever to occur in Portugal, with the code name Orion, more than 64 terrorists were arrested and, a day later, their main leaders, including Otelo Saraiva de Carvalho. The operation, which involved more than 300 police officers, lead to the arrest of both members form the terrorist organization – FP-25, as well as the leaders and militants of the political party – Força de Unidade Popular (FUP) – that was allegedly giving legal cover to the organization. In addition to an ideological convergence, it was noticed a coincidence of some militants and coordination between legal and clandestine entities. This joint structure was called the Global Project (see above in the context the emergence of FUP).

In the following years, most of the FP-25 militants who were still on the run, were either arrested or sought refuge abroad — namely in Mozambique — a fact that would dictate the progressive dissolution of the organization until its complete disappearance around 1991.

=== Incoherent treatment compared to the right-wing organisations ===
Here is important to stress the same could be argued in terms of overlapping between the extreme right bombing organisations (Movimento Democrático de Libertação de Portugal - MDLP; Movimento Maria da Fonte; Exército de Libertação de Portugal - ELP; Comandos Operacionais de Defesa da Civilização Ocidental - CODECO) and right-wing parties (Partido Social Democrata - PPD/PSD; and particularly CDS – Partido Popular) or the support of parts of the Catholic church. Allegedly, Sá Carneiro called Ramiro Moreira (PPD militant number 7 and their security guard) to demand his resignation, or the driver of Freitas do Amaral and members of support of CDS MPs promoted bombings.

Regarding the political arm of MDLP, known members of their political cabinet have risen high in the political spheres and the confessed leaders such as General António de Spínola and Comandante Alpoim Calvão were never charged.

=== Terrorist association trial ===
The trial began a little more than one year after Operation Orion, in July 1985. The defendants were on trial for crimes of terrorist association and attacks against democracy. The district attorney alleged the following: "That the Global Project/FP25, founded and directed by Otelo Saraiva de Carvalho, Pedro Goulart, Mouta Liz and others, is an armed terrorist organization…"; "That this terrorist organization aimed at the destruction, by weapons, of the Portuguese democratic regime, constituting in Portugal an urban terrorism organization, typical of demo-liberal democracies, corresponding, in its scale, to the Italian Red Brigades and partially to the German RAF… "; "The governing body of the Global Project/FP25 is the DPM – Political-Military Directorate – which includes the defendants Otelo Saraiva de Carvalho, Pedro Goulart, Humberto Dinis Machado, José Mouta Liz…….. ".

In May 1987, Otelo Saraiva de Carvalho was sentenced to 15 years in prison. After passing through the Court of Appeal and the Supreme Court of Justice, Otelo Saraiva de Carvalho's sentence was set at 17 years.

However, Portugal was adapting its institutions to European and democratic standards and the newly set Constitutional Court partially annulled the initial sentence for unconstitutionality twice, in 1989 and 1996.

=== Defendants arguments and solidarity ===
The defendants contested the arguments made by the accusation and pointed to several juridical irregularities. Several books compiled the defendants arguments. The first trial, the only where the proves were made, was still under the sign of the civil code of the dictatorship, conceding less rights to the defendants. The chief judge of the trial in Monsanto, 1987, was both the accusation and jury, which was illegal. Multiple witness testimonies defied the accusations made: presidents, militaries, politicians.

The perception of injustice led to a vast movement of national and international solidarity for the defendants in the FUP/FP-25 process. European and Portuguese Members of Parliament and lawyers, Ramsey Clark, former US general-attorney, academics, artists, writers, militaries and politicians showed their solidarity. Denunciations include harsh prison conditions as the closure in prison cells, moving defendants to prisons faraway of the families or lawyers, or the denial of healthcare.

=== Amnesty and acquittal ===
During Otelo's arrest, trial and specially after his conviction, the involvement of President Mário Soares was increasing. Several socialists’, members of parliament, were visiting the convicts in jail, meeting with their families or with Otelo supporters activists groups.

Abroad, François Mitterrand questioned Mário Soares about Otelo, naming him as "Portuguese Sakharov". President Mário Soares wanted to preserve Otelo as a symbol of Carnation Revolution and felt legitimated to politically resolve an issue that was related to justice.

Meanwhile, on 10 May 1991, some terrorist made a symbolic handover of some weapons, together with a document in which they renounced armed violence and assumed the end of the terrorist group.

In October 1995 legislative elections, the right lost its majority: PSD and CDS together amounted to no more than 103 deputies and the left, PS (socialists) and PCP (communists), now had a majority capable of getting the law passed. At 3 March 1996, the parliament, after a long and very heated discussion, approved a global amnesty to FP25 convicts for crimes of terrorist and attack to democracy. It was approved by 123 votes in favor from PS and PCP and some PSD deputies, 94 votes from the PSD and CDS and 3 abstentions from independent deputies.

The blood crimes and murders were later judged separately. The assassinations later went on trial and the sentences in April 2001 and June 2003 exonerated Otelo and the dozens of other defendants. The Emeritus Supreme Court President Noronha do Nascimento stated "Otelo was acquitted because nothing was proven against him".

== See also ==
- Otelo Saraiva de Carvalho
- Brigadas Revolucionárias
- Revolutionary Party of the Proletariat
