= Processo Revolucionário Em Curso governing bodies =

The Processo Revolucionário Em Curso (English: Ongoing Revolutionary Process) is the period of the history of Portugal from the Carnation Revolution on 25 April 1974 to the establishment of a new constitution and the legislative elections on 25 April 1976. The turbulent period saw a number of governing bodies.

== Council of State ==
Portuguese Council of State, from 31 May 1974

- Citizens: Diogo de Freitas do Amaral, Henrique de Barros, Almeida Bruno, Isabel Magalhães Colcaco, Rafael Durão, Ruy Luis Gomes, Azeredo Perdigão
- National Salvation Junta (JSN): José Pinheiro de Azevedo, António Rosa Coutinho, Francisco da Costa Gomes, Jaime Silvério Marques, Carlos Galvão de Melo, Diogo Neto, António de Spínola
- Movimento das Forças Armadas (MFA): Vítor Alves^, Ernesto Melo Antunes, Almada Contreiras, Victor Crespo, Vasco Gonçalves^, Costa Martins^, Pereira Pinto

^ replaced in the second government by Vasco Lourenço, Franco Charais, Canto e Castro

== Committee of Twenty ==
Committee of Twenty, from 28 September 1974

- Air Force: Canto e Castro, Pereira Pinto, Mendes Dias, Pinho Freire, Costa Martins
- Army: Franco Charais, Vasco Lourenço, P. Soares, Carlos Fabião, Francisco da Costa Gomes, F.L. Pires, Vítor Alves, Ernesto Melo Antunes, Vasco Gonçalves, Otelo S. Carvalho
- Navy: Almada Contreiras, Miguel Judas, José Pinheiro de Azevedo, António Rosa Coutinho, Victor Crespo

== First Council of the Revolution ==
First Council of the Revolution, from 11 March 1975
.

- Air Force: Canto e Castro, Graça Cunha, Mendes Dias, Pinho Freire, Costa Martins, Costa Neves, Pereira Pinto, Morais e Silva
- Army: Victor Alves, Melo Antunes, Otelo, Sousa e Castro, Franco Charais, Pezarat Correia, Corvacho, Carlos Fabião, Francisco Costa Gomes, Vasco Gonçalves, Marques Júnior, Vasco Lourenço, Macedo, Fisher L. Pires, Pinto Soares, Ferreira Sousa
- Navy: Pinheiro de Azevedo, Almada Contreiras, Ramiro Correia, Rosa Coutinho, Victor Crespo, Martins Guerreiro, Miguel Judas

== Second Council of the Revolution ==
Second Council of the Revolution, from 5 September 1975

- Air Force: Canto e Castro, Graça Cunha, Pinho Freire, Costa Martins, Costa Neves, Pereira Pinto, Morais e Silva
- Army: Victor Alves, Melo Antunes, Otelo, Sousa e Castro, Franco Charais, Corvacho, Carlos Fabião, Francisco Costa Gomes, Vasco Gonçalves, Marques Júnior, Vasco Lourenço, Macedo, Ferreira Sousa, Pires Veloso
- Navy: Pinheiro de Azevedo, Almada Contreiras, Ramiro Correia, Rosa Coutinho, Victor Crespo, Martins Guerreiro, Felgueiras Soares

== Third Council of the Revolution ==
Third Council of the Revolution, from 28 November 1975, following the Coup of 25 November 1975

- Air Force: Canto e Castro, Graça Cunha, Pinho Freire, Costa Neves, Morais da Silva, Ribeiro Cardoso
- Army: Melo Antunes, Otelo, Sousa e Castro, Franco Charais, Pezarat Correia, Ramalho Eanes, Carlos Fabião, Francisco Costa Gomes, Marques Júnior, Vasco Lourenço, Loureiro dos Santos, Pires Veloso, Rocha Vieira
- Navy: Pinheiro de Azevedo, Almada Contreiras, Ramiro Correia, Almeida e Costa, Rosa Coutinho, Victor Crespo, Souto Cruz, Martins Guerreiro, Miguel Judas, Felgueiras Soares
