= Palacete de São Bento =

Official residence of the Prime Minister of Portugal

São Bento Mansion
- Palacete de São Bente (Portuguese)
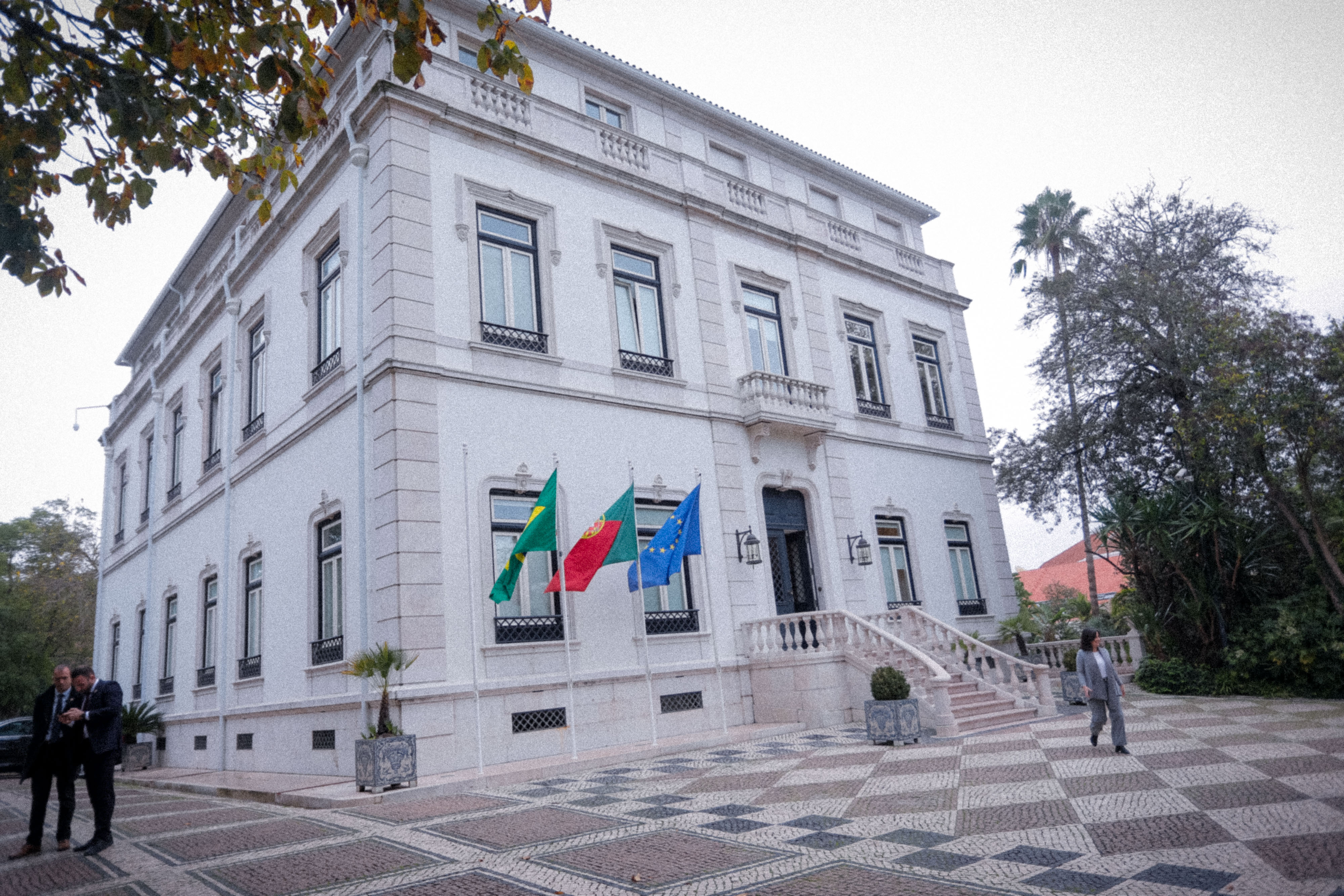
- São Bento Mansion
- Interactive map of the São Bento Mansion area
- Alternative names: Official residence of the prime minister

General information
- Architectural style: Neoclassical
- Location: 4 Rua da Imprensa à Estrela, 1200-888 Lisboa, Lisbon, Portugal
- Coordinates: 38°42′46.4″N 9°9′19″W
- Completed: 1877; 149 years ago

Technical details
- Floor count: 3
- Grounds: 2 hectares

The São Bento Mansion (Note: Portuguese: Palacete de São Bento, lit. 'Small Palace of Saint Benedict') is the official residence of the Prime Minister of Portugal. It is a 19th-century mansion house located within the grounds of São Bento Palace in Lisbon, the meeting place of the Portuguese parliament. Formally, the building is referred to as the Residência Oficial do Primeiro-Ministro, 'Official Residence of the Prime Minister'.

== History ==
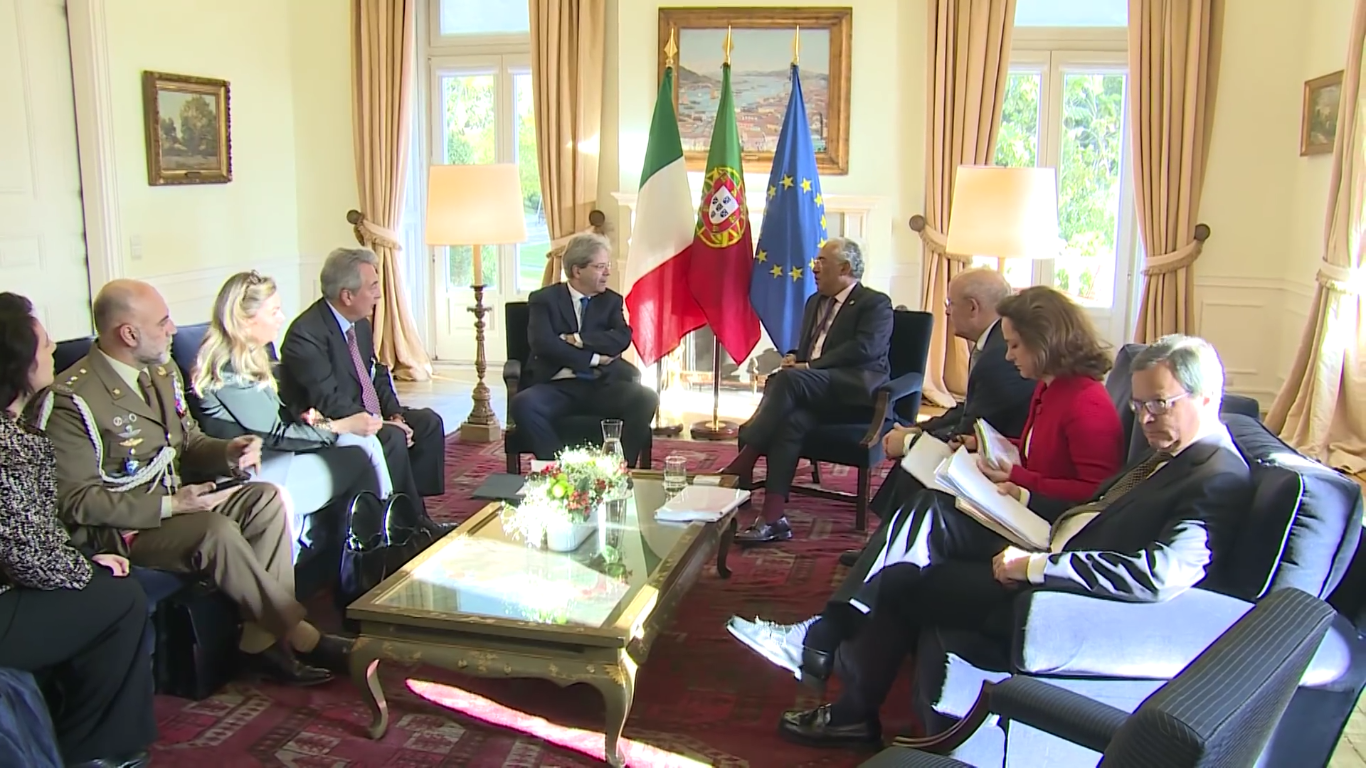
António Costa receives Paolo Gentiloni, prime minister of Italy, in January 2017

=== Construction ===
The house was first built by capitalist Joaquim Machado Cayres in 1877, to serve as his private residence. The plot of land he bought for it had belonged to the adjoining Benedictine Monastery since 1598.

=== State acquisition ===
In 1928, the newly established authoritarian regime expropriated the mansion so that it would become the official residence of the president of the Council of Ministers (then the official title of the prime minister). After the necessary fitting-out works, António de Oliveira Salazar moved into the mansion in May 1938, even though the formal unveiling only took place eleven months later, in April 1939. During the works, a monumental staircase connecting the grounds of the mansion to the parliament gardens was commissioned to architect Cristino da Silva.

When Marcelo Caetano became prime minister in 1968, the mansion saw major renovations: little more than the façades were kept. These works also added a new upper floor to the building, where before there was only an old attic.

=== Post-1974 ===
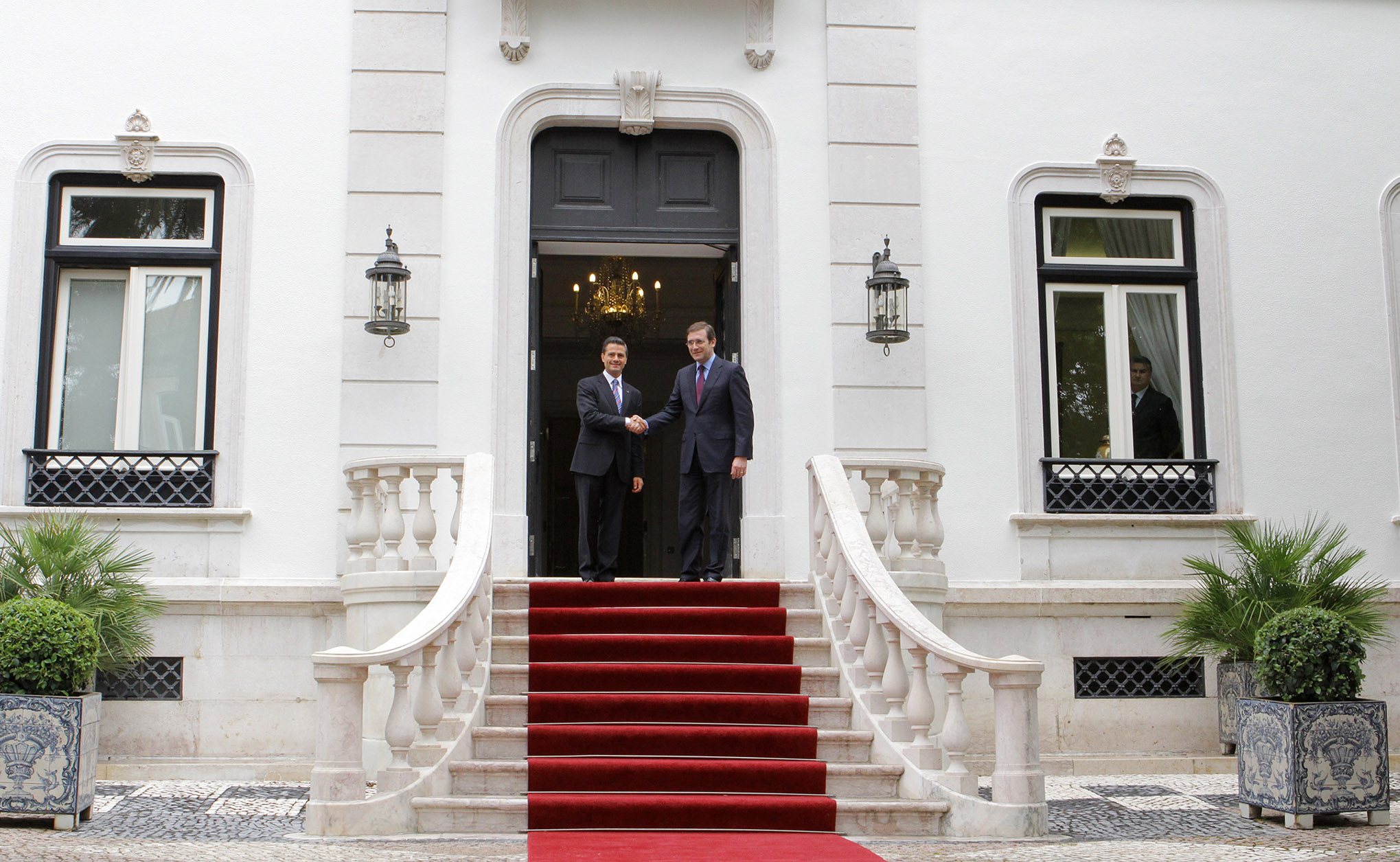
Pedro Passos Coelho shakes hands with Enrique Peña Nieto, president of Mexico, in June 2014

After the Carnation Revolution on 25 April 1974, the mansion and the gardens were slightly modified, but it was only in 1986, when they saw new renovation works, that the official residence gained greater operability and a modern image. The garage was converted into a building to receive foreign visitors. The old tarmac was replaced with intricately patterned Portuguese pavement.

In 2007, in order to increase the residence's energy efficiency, it was equipped with a wind turbine, with a production capacity of 3.5 MWh/year, and photovoltaic panels, capable of producing up to 6.7 MWh/year.

Starting 5 June 2016, the gardens of São Bento Mansion are open to the public on Sundays, bar those in which visits would collide with the prime minister's official schedule. These visits were a result of a protocol between the presidency of the Council of Ministers and the Lisbon City Council. Starting on 5 October 2017, the year-long exhibition "Arte em São Bento" (Art in São Bento), also visitable on Sundays, saw the mostly academic art collection in the residence (on loan from several museums in the country) be replaced with works from the Serralves Contemporary Art Museum. The intention is to change the art collections there every year, on 5 October (the anniversary of the proclamation of the Portuguese Republic).

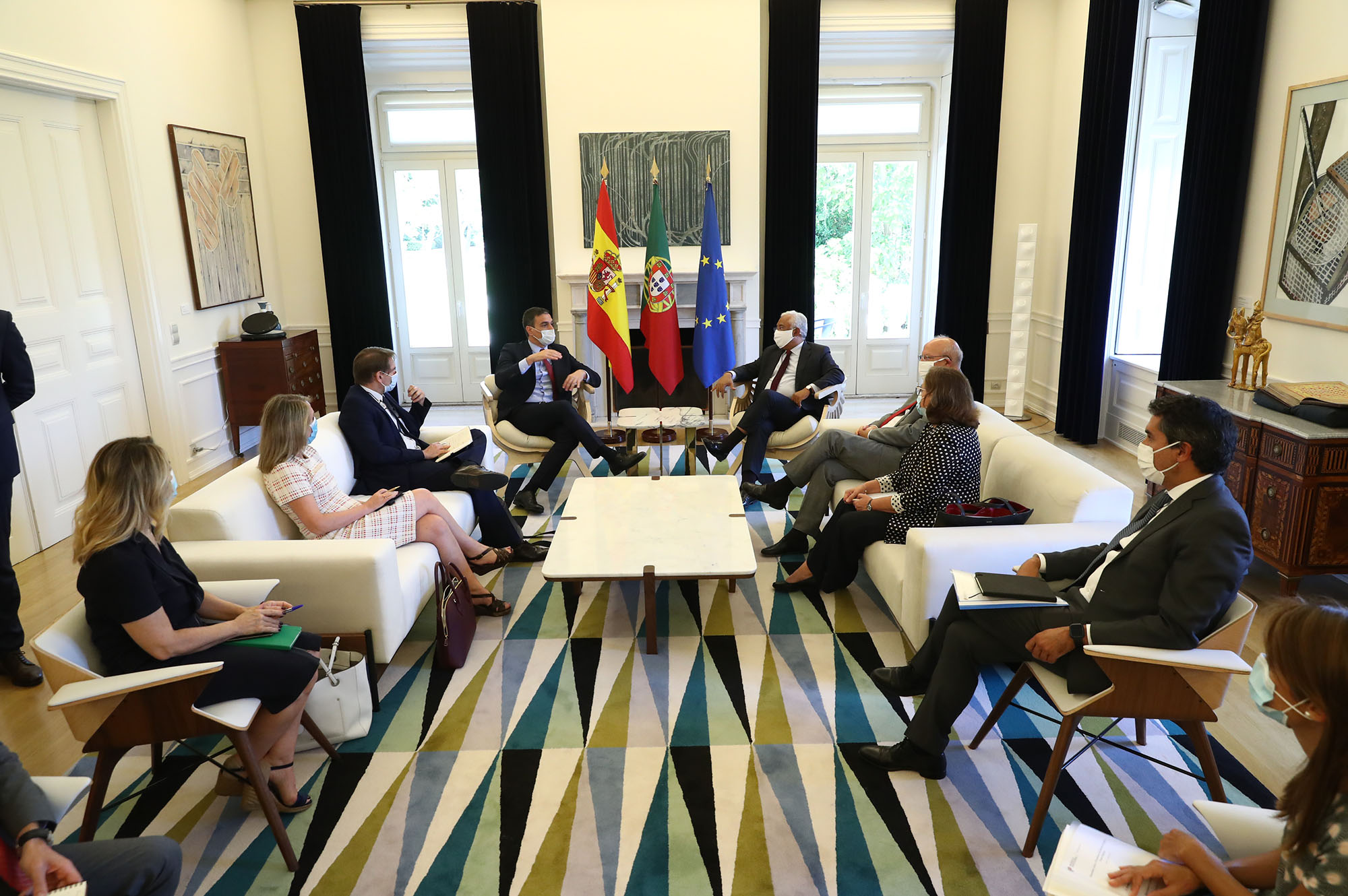
The contemporary art collections on display during a meeting between António Costa and Pedro Sánchez, Prime Minister of Spain, in July 2020

Even though it has been the official residence of the Portuguese prime minister since 1938, very few prime ministers have since opted to actually live there during their respective terms in office. Those who have were António de Oliveira Salazar (prime minister from 1933 to 1968; resided from 1938 to 1970), Vasco Gonçalves (prime minister from 1974 to 1975), José Pinheiro de Azevedo (prime minister from 1975 to 1976), Carlos Mota Pinto (prime minister from 1978 to 1979), Aníbal Cavaco Silva (prime minister from 1985 to 1995), and Pedro Santana Lopes (prime minister from 2004 to 2005).

In 2018, it was announced that several reports (including one from the National Laboratory for Civil Engineering) identified safety issues on São Bento Mansion; from April to October of that year, the gardens were closed and the residence was renovated with new heating, ventilation and air conditioning, electrical wiring and fire protection systems. In the meantime, the Office of the Prime Minister was temporarily moved to the old premises of the Ministry of the Sea, in Commerce Square.

== See also ==
- Belém Palace
- São Bento Palace
