= António de Spínola =

Portuguese president and politician

His Excellency Field Marshall António de Spínola GCTE GCL ComA
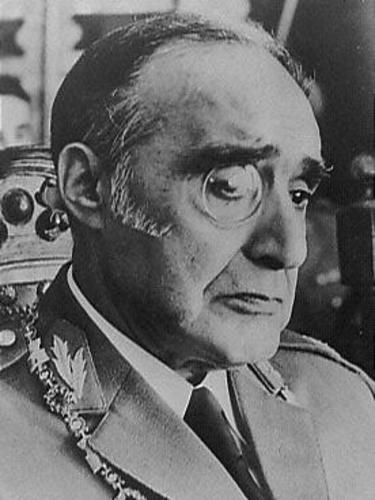
- Spínola during his resignation, 1974

President of Portugal
- In office 15 May 1974 – 30 September 1974
- Prime Minister: Adelino da Palma Carlos; Vasco Gonçalves
- Preceded by: Américo Tomás
- Succeeded by: Francisco da Costa Gomes

President of the National Salvation Junta
- In office 25 April 1974 – 30 September 1974
- Preceded by: Office established
- Succeeded by: Francisco da Costa Gomes

Governor of Portuguese Guinea
- In office 20 May 1968 – 6 August 1973
- President: Américo Tomás
- Prime Minister: António de Oliveira Salazar; Marcello Caetano
- Minister of the Colonies: Joaquim da Silva Cunha
- Preceded by: Arnaldo Schulz
- Succeeded by: Bettencourt Rodrigues

Personal details
- Born: 11 April 1910 Estremoz, Kingdom of Portugal
- Died: 13 August 1996 (aged 86) Lisbon, Portuguese Republic
- Party: MDLP (Note: Movimento Democrático de Libertação de Portugal (Democratic Movement for the Liberation of Portugal).)
- Spouse: Maria Helena Martin Monteiro de Barros
- Parent(s): António Sebastião Spínola (father); Maria Gabriela Alves Ribeiro (mother)
- Education: Military Academy
- Occupation: Politician; Writer
- Profession: Military officer
- Portfolio: Overseas Colonial Territories
- Awards: Order of the Tower and Sword; Order of Aviz

Military service
- Allegiance: Portugal
- Branch/service: Portuguese Army
- Years of service: 1920–1974, 1981
- Rank: General (effective); Field Marshal (honorific)
- Commands: 345th Cavalry Battalion; Military Governor of Guinea-Bissau; Movimento das Forças Armadas
- Battles/wars: Portuguese Colonial War; Guinea-Bissau War of Independence

António Sebastião Ribeiro de Spínola (Portuguese: [ɐ̃ ˈtɔniu ðɨ ˈspinulɐ]; 11 April 1910 – 13 August 1996) was a Portuguese military officer, author and conservative politician. During the Estado Novo regime he became one of Portugal's most senior military commanders, leading military operations against independence movements. After the Carnation Revolution, partially organised by under-ranked military captains, he was invited to be the president of Portugal. His role in Portugal's transition to democracy remains highly controversial, particularly regarding his role in leading the 11 March 1975 attempted coup as well as the anticommunist terrorist organisation Movimento Democrático de Libertação de Portugal (Democratic Movement for the Liberation of Portugal). He was noted for wearing a monocle on his right eye.

== Early life ==
Spínola was born in Santo André, Estremoz in 1910 to António Sebastião Spínola and his first wife Maria Gabriela Alves Ribeiro, both natives of Madeira.

== Career ==
Spínola entered the Colégio Militar in 1920, beginning what would be a very successful military career. By 1928, Spínola was at Portugal's Military Academy, where he stood out as a young and promising cavalry officer.

In Anjos, Lisbon, by August 1932, he married Maria Helena Martin Monteiro de Barros (14 January 1913 – 23 May 2002), daughter of João de Azevedo Monteiro de Barros and his German wife Gertrud Elisabete Martin.

In 1939, he became adjunct-de-camp of the Guarda Nacional Republicana (Republican National Guard). In 1941 he travelled to the German-Russian Front, as an observer, to monitor Wehrmacht movements during the encirclement of Leningrad (the Portuguese volunteers had been incorporated into the Blue Division).

In 1961, guided by António de Oliveira Salazar, he offered himself for voluntary service in the Portuguese colonies of West Africa. Between 1961 and 1963, he held the command of the 345th Cavalry Battalion in Portuguese Angola, distinguishing himself and his unit. At the end of his tenure, he was appointed for, and served as, the Governor and Commander-in-Chief of the Armed Forces of the Portuguese Guinea from 1968, and again in 1972, during the period of the Overseas War, where his administration favoured a policy of respect for ethnic Guineans and the traditional authorities.

At the same time, he continued to practice a range of initiatives in the War. These included armed incursions to neighbouring states, most notably Operation Green Sea, which saw the assault by Portuguese Army Commandos into Conakry, Guinea. This operation was a failed attempt to carry out a coup against Ahmed Sékou Touré because of the latter's support for the independence movement PAIGC. Spínola also arranged clandestine meetings: in 1972 he met secretly with the president of Senegal, Léopold Sédar Senghor, to negotiate with the PAIGC, but he was rebuffed for this by Salazar's successor Marcelo Caetano.

In November 1973, he returned to Lisbon, on the invitation of Caetano, to head the Overseas portfolio. However, he refused this due to the government's intransigence on the Portuguese colonies. A month later, on 17 January 1974, he was asked to be the Vice-Chief of the Defence Council of the Armed Forces, on the advice of Francisco da Costa Gomes. Shortly later, he would publish Portugal e o Futuro (Portugal and the Future), which had at first been blocked from publication by the Portuguese censors. In this work, Spínola expressed the idea that the only solution to the Colonial Wars was the discontinuation of the conflict. He also defended a form of African "self-determination", yet without suggesting that the Portuguese colonies should gain independence, and suggested that Caetano should be replaced. The publication of the book swiftly led to Spínola's removal from the Defence Council.

== Carnation Revolution ==
On 25 April 1974, as a general in the MFA (Movimento das Forças Armadas or Armed Forces Movement), he received from the President of the Council of Ministers, Marcelo Caetano, the rendition of the Government, which was in refuge in the Carmo Barracks. Although General Spínola did not play an important role, Caetano insisted he would only surrender power to Spínola. This allowed Spínola to assume an important public place as a leader of the revolution, although that was not what the MFA originally intended. The formation of the National Salvation Junta, formed in the days following the Carnation Revolution, allowed Spínola to take on the role of President of the Republic.

Spínola met with Mobutu Sese Seko, the President of Zaire, Hilgard Muller, South African Foreign Minister, and Hugo Biermann, South African Defence Chief, on 15 September 1974, on Sal Island in the Portuguese Cape Verde, crafting a plan to empower Holden Roberto of the National Liberation Front of Angola, Jonas Savimbi of UNITA, and Daniel Chipenda leader of the MPLA's eastern faction (a rival of MPLA leader Agostinho Neto) while retaining the façade of national unity; Mobutu, the South Africans, and Spínola wanted to diminish Neto's importance and present Chipenda as the MPLA leader (Mobutu particularly preferring Chipenda to Neto because Chipenda supported autonomy for the province of Cabinda, an Angolan exclave surrounded by Zaire and the Republic of the Congo, and Neto did not). The group also relied on the immense petroleum reserves of the province, estimated at around 300 million tons, which the Mobutu government required for economic survival. At the same time, Spínola and other right-wing forces among the Portuguese elites resisted the full decolonization of Angola and Mozambique. To make his case for slowing down this process, he made reference to the large numbers of Portuguese emigrants who resided in these territories.

== Exile and death ==
Spínola lasted as the first post-Revolution President from 15 May 1974 until 30 September of the same year, to be substituted by General Francisco da Costa Gomes. His resignation was partly due to what he saw as the profound move to the political left, their effects on the military and the independence of the Portuguese colonies. Discontent over these changes, he tried to intervene politically to mitigate the agenda of the MFA. He resigned fifteen days later on 30 September 1974, after just four months in power, when he realized he would not be able to block the application of the MFA program.

His appeals to the maioria silenciosa (silent majority), to resist the political radicalization of the left after the failed coup of 28 September 1974, and his tentative involvement in the rightist counter-revolution on 11 March 1975 (wherein he fled to Brazil) were examples that Spínola had changed his allegiances. As the author Günter Wallraff wrote in his book Aufdeckung einer Verschwörung – die Spínola-Aktion ("Revealing a conspiracy – the Spínola operation"), Spínola was always interested in returning to power and eliminating his political adversaries.

During Spínola's exile to Brazil, he was approached by Wallraff who had infiltrated Spínola's group, pretending to be an arms dealer working for Franz-Josef Strauss, a conservative and leader of the Christian Social Union in Bavaria. Spínola's group was the Democratic Movement for the Liberation of Portugal (Movimento Democrático de Libertação de Portugal or MDLP), an anti-communist network of terrorist bombers, responsible for the death of a priest, whose operatives included Carlos Paixão, Alfredo Vitorino, Valter dos Santos and Alcides Pereira. As their leader, Spínola had met with Wallraff to negotiate the purchase of arms and had supporters in the Alentejo who awaited the word to regain power (which Wallraff submitted as proof in order to detain Spínola by Swiss authorities). But there was never enough proof to charge him or his conspirators in court.

But even his extreme swing would not affect his importance in the Carnation Revolution. In 1981 Spínola was promoted to the highest rank in the Army, Field Marshal. His prestige was rehabilitated officially on 5 February 1987 by President Mário Soares, who bestowed on him the Grã-Cruz da Ordem Militar da Torre e Espada (Grand Cross of the Order of the Tower and Sword), for:

... his heroic military and civic service and for being a symbol of the April Revolution and first President of the Republic after the dictatorship ...

On 13 August 1996, aged 86, Spínola died in Lisbon from a pulmonary embolism.

In the 2000 film Capitães de Abril, Spínola is played by the actor Ruy de Carvalho.

In 2010, the mayor of Lisbon, António Costa, marked the centennial of Spínola's birth in a ceremony attended by President Aníbal Cavaco Silva, which included the presentation of a plaque and naming of a new avenue in the capital.

Arms of António de Spínola as knight of the Order of Isabella the Catholic

== Honours ==
=== National ===
- Grand Cross of the Order of Liberty (GCL, 5 July 2023)(posthumously)
- Grand Master and Grand Cross of the Sash of the Three Orders (BTO, 15 May 1974 – 30 September 1974)
- Grand Cross of the Military Order of the Tower and Sword (GCTE, 13 February 1987)
- Grand Officer of the Military Order of the Tower and Sword (GOTE, 6 July 1973)
- Commander of the Order of Aviz (ComA, 16 May 1959)
- Officer of the Order of Aviz (OA, 23 January 1948)

=== Foreign ===
- Spain:
  - Knight Grand Cross of the Order of Isabella the Catholic (14 December 1987)
  - Grand Cross (White Decoration) of the Cross of Military Merit (16 May 1947)

== Published works ==
- Por Uma Guiné Melhor (1970)
- Linha de Acção (1971)
- No Caminho do Futuro (1972)
- Por Uma Portugalidade Renovada (1973)
- Portugal e o Futuro (1974)
- Ao Serviço de Portugal (1976)
- País sem Rumo (1978)

== Sources ==
- Fotobiografias do Século XX, Photobiography of António de Spínola, Círculo de Leitores.

Political offices
Preceded by None, office created	President of the National Salvation Junta; 1974	Succeeded by Francisco da Costa Gomes
Preceded by Américo Tomás	President of Portugal; 1974	Succeeded by Francisco da Costa Gomes
