= Ernesto Melo Antunes =

Portuguese military officer

Ernesto Melo Antunes GCL OA
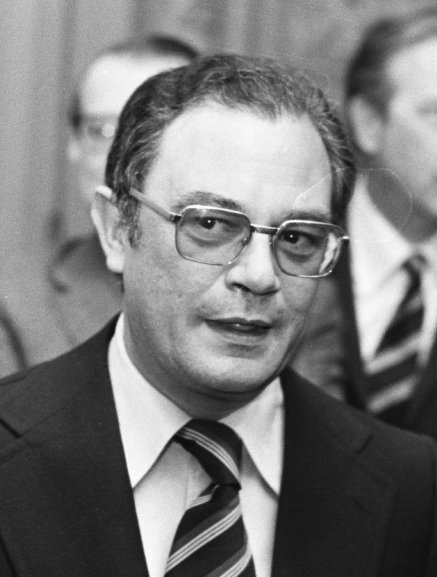
- Ernesto de Melo Antunes in 1975

Minister of Foreign Affairs
- In office 19 September 1975 – 23 July 1976
- Prime Minister: José Pinheiro de Azevedo; Vasco de Almeida e Costa
- Preceded by: Mário Ruivo
- Succeeded by: José Medeiros Ferreira
- In office 26 March 1975 – 8 August 1975
- Prime Minister: Vasco Gonçalves
- Preceded by: Mário Soares
- Succeeded by: Mário Ruivo

Minister without portfolio
- In office 30 September 1974 – 26 March 1975
- Prime Minister: Vasco Gonçalves

Personal details
- Born: Ernesto Augusto de Melo Antunes; 2 October 1933 Lisbon, Portugal
- Died: 10 August 1999 (aged 65) Sintra, Portugal
- Party: Independent
- Education: Military Academy; University of Lisbon
- Profession: Military officer

Military service
- Allegiance: Portugal
- Branch/service: Portuguese Army
- Years of service: 1957–1978
- Rank: Lieutenant colonel
- Battles/wars: Portuguese Colonial War; Carnation Revolution

Ernesto Augusto de Melo Antunes GCL OA (Lisbon, 2 October 1933 – 10 August 1999) was a Portuguese military officer who had a major role in the Carnation Revolution of 25 April 1974.

== Background ==
Melo Antunes was the son of Ernesto Augusto Antunes (1907–1986) and Maria José Forjaz de Melo (1911–1987). Born in Lisbon on 2 October 1933, he moved to Angola at the age of 6, as a result of his father's military posting. He returned to Portugal at the age of 10 and lived in Aveiro and Tavira. Under pressure from his family, he entered military college in 1953. An avid reader since youth, he attended classes at the University of Lisbon in Philosophy (his main interest) and Law. His intellectual curiosity led him to read Marx and other authors prohibited by the Portuguese Dictatorship, and led to his exile to the Azores in 1957.

Deeply involved in cultural and political activities he formed in 1962, with Manuel Alegre, the Patriotic Action of the Azores. The group which supported activities to counter political propaganda. His most daring project was instigating a military and popular revolt in the Azores, with the promised support of General Humberto Delgado. This attempt was unsuccessful, as General Delgado withdrew support.

In 1971–1973, he completed his third and last combat posting in Angola, an experience that was instrumental in forming his anti-colonialist political thinking. It was a traumatic experience, which led him to declare that he had fought on the "wrong side."

His initial participation in the Movement of Captains, a military group plotting to overthrow the dictatorship, occurred in 1974. He was recognised immediately for his solid knowledge, and he was asked to draft the political program of the Movement of the Armed Forces (MFA). Thus began his role as the "intellectual in uniform" and his role as the author of some of the most important political documents of the Carnation Revolution.

== Career highlights ==
Melo Antunes was the principal author of the political program of the military movement that overthrew the regime, the Movement of the Armed Forces. Known as the 3 D's, the Programme of the MFA proposed decolonization, democratization, and development. After the revolution, Melo Antunes was in the forefront of political power and highly respected. He was a member of the Coordinating Commission of the Movement (MFA), and after the revolutionary period was member of the Portuguese Council of State.

He was Minister without Portfolio of the II and II Provisional Governments. One of his first roles was to manage the complex decolonization process, following the promulgation of Law 7/74 on July 27, 1974, that "acknowledged the independence of overseas territories." Melo Antunes was the main negotiator of the independence of Guinea-Bissau.

He was responsible for a Working Group tasked to establish a Socio-Economic Program, under the III Provisional Government. Although the Working Group comprised key socio-economic figures of the period (Rui Vilar, Silva Lopes, Maria de Lurdes Pintasilgo and Vitor Constancio), the document became known as the Plan Melo Antunes. It was a controversial plan, which caused tensions within the Movement of the Armed Forces (MFA), and this was finally overturned on March 11, 1975.

Appointed member of the Revolutionary Council on March 14, 1975, he retained this position until dissolution of the Council as a result of the Constitutional Revision of 1982. He was Minister of Foreign Affairs in the IV (March 26 to August 8, 1975) and VI (September 19, 1975 to July 22, 1976) Provisional Governments.

During the summer (Verao Quente) of intense political-ideological struggle, Melo Antunes produced on August 7, 1975, the Document of Nine (Documento dos Nove), a document released by the Movement of Nine (Movimento dos Nove). This document proposed a third way in the form of an original political platform that rejected the extreme left-wing and the Communist Bloc-inspired action of the Portuguese Communist Party, as well as the social-democratic model of many countries of Western Europe, while maintaining the importance of a pluralistic democracy. This document was welcomed with relief by both the military and civilian population, disenchanted with the increasing hegemony of Vasco Goncalves and the Portuguese Communist Party, and ended up adopted by all as a common program.

Another of his major political intervention occurred on November 25, 1975, when in the face of pressure to ban the Communist Party, he appeared on television to defend its right to continued existence as an integral part of Portuguese democracy. This act caused him enemies lasting throughout his life, but also led to great admiration for his courage and to his being perceived by many as the "guiding light" for members of the Revolutionary Military who did not wish to see a new dictatorship imposed.

Between 1977 and 1983, he served as President of the Constitutional Commission, the precursor to the Constitutional Tribunal. During the second presidency of António Ramalho Eanes, he served as member of the Council of State, and again during the presidency of Jorge Sampaio.

He was Advisor (1984) and Assistant Director General (1986–1988) of UNESCO. Despite calls for his candidacy for the presidency of UNESCO in 1992, the Portuguese Government declined support. In 1991, he joined the Socialist Party, his first formal adherence to any political party. In 2004, he was promoted posthumously to Colonel.

== Decorations ==
He received the Grand Cross of the Order of Liberty for his services to the country and to democracy.

== Marriage and issue ==
He married Gabriela Maria da Câmara de Ataide Mota (b. 9 July 1941), daughter of Luís de Ataíde Mota (1912–1969) and Maria Eduarda de Medeiros da Câmara de Melo Cabral (b. Ponta Delgada, São Pedro, 19 December 1919) (great-great-niece in female line of the 1st Viscount de Faria e Maia), both from the Nobility of Azores, and had issue:

- Catarina de Ataíde Mota de Melo Antunes (b. Ponta Delgada, 6 October 1962), married on 5 September 1988 to Jorge Miguel Lupi Alves Caetano (b. 23 April 1959), paternal grandson of Marcelo Caetano and Teresa Teixeira de Queirós de Barros, and had issue
- Ernesto Luís de Ataíde Mota de Melo Antunes (b. Ponta Delgada, 14 December 1963), married in Cascais, at the Casa de Santa Marta, on 13 February 1999 to María del Pilar de Amat Tasso de Vasconcelos (b. Lisbon, 11 November 1970), daughter of Luís Ricardo Vaz Monteiro de Vasconcelos Franco (b. Ponta Delgada, 27 October 1941 and divorced), also of the Nobility of Azores, and first wife María del Pilar de Amat y Aboim Inglez (Lisbon, 17 March 1946), of Spanish paternal descent and of maternal noble descent from Alentejo, and had issue:
  - Ernesto Luís de Amat de Vasconcelos de Melo Antunes (b. Lisbon, 11 April 2000)
  - Maria Luísa de Amat de Vasconcelos de Melo Antunes (b. Lisbon, 16 April 2002)
- Joana de Ataíde Mota de Melo Antunes (b. Lisbon, São Sebastião da Pedreira, 8 March 1975), unmarried and without issue

On 21 June 1997 in Sintra, he married a second time Maria Jose de Souza Pereira (b. 19 March 1952), daughter of Antonio Joaquim de Barros Pereira (1906–1969) and Elvie Irene de Souza Pereira (1917–2002) of Macau. She gave up her international career as banker and investment advisor upon marriage.

== Death ==
Melo Antunes died of cancer on 10 August 1999, in Sintra.
