= National Salvation Junta =

1974–1975 Portuguese military government

Portuguese Republic República Portuguesa (Portuguese)
- 1974–1975
- Flag Coat of arms
- Anthem: A Portuguesa "The Portuguese"
- Emblem of the Armed Forces Movement

- Capital: Lisbon
- Common languages: Portuguese
- Demonym: Portuguese
- Government: Military junta
- President
  - 1974–1974: António de Spínola
  - 1974–1976: Francisco da Costa Gomes
- History
  - Proclamation: 26 April 1974
  - Disestablished: 14 March 1975
- Currency: Escudo
- ISO 3166 code: PT
Preceded by
Estado Novo
Succeeded by
Third Portuguese Republic
People's Republic of Angola
People's Republic of Mozambique
Guinea-Bissau

The National Salvation Junta (Portuguese: Junta de Salvação Nacional [ˈʒũtɐ ðɨ salvɐˈsɐ̃w nɐsiuˈnal]) was a group of military officers designated to maintain the government of Portugal in April 1974 after the Carnation Revolution had overthrown the Estado Novo dictatorial regime. This junta assumed power on the same day of the revolution. The National Salvation Junta was the de jure governing body of Portugal following the Carnation Revolution. It was replaced by the Revolutionary Council on March 14, 1975, following the coup attempt by president Spínola on March 11.

== Purpose ==
The Junta was a pre-planned part of the national reform program envisioned by the Movimento das Forças Armadas (Movement of the Armed Forces; MFA), which aimed to exercise political power after the revolution and prior to the formation of a civilian government in order to prevent the collapse of the Presidency of the Republic (then held by Rear-Admiral Américo Tomás) and of the government. It entailed the dissolution of the National Assembly and of the Council of State. The Constitutional Law 1/74 of 25 April 1974 was promulgated in order to set this process in motion. The Junta assumed upon itself the power to choose the president and vice president.

On an interim basis, the Junta also exercised the functions of the Presidency of the Republic (from 26 April to 15 May, when it designated as Head of State the president of the Junta, António de Spínola) and of President of the Council (from 26 April to 16 May, when the MFA-chosen First Provisional Government of Portugal took power, headed by Adelino da Palma Carlos).

== Members ==
The Junta was composed of:

- General António Ribeiro de Spínola (President),
- General Francisco da Costa Gomes (Army),
- Brigadier Jaime Silvério Marques (Army),
- General Diogo Neto (Air Force – absent in Portuguese Mozambique),
- Colonel Carlos Galvão de Melo (Air Force),
- Naval Captain José Baptista Pinheiro de Azevedo (Navy),
- Naval Commander António Alva Rosa Coutinho (Navy).

On 30 September 1974 the staff was reorganized:

- General Francisco da Costa Gomes (president, Army),
- Lieutenant Colonel Carlos Alberto Idães Soares Fabião (former governor of Portuguese Guinea, Army).
- Lieutenant-Colonel Nuno Fisher Lopes Pires (Army).
- Vice-Admiral José Pinheiro de Azevedo (Navy).
- Naval Captain Silvano Alves Ribeiro (Navy), during the absence of Naval Commander António Rosa Coutinho, who was appointed the governor of Portuguese Angola.
- Lieutenant-Colonel Narciso Mendes Dias (Air Force),
- Lieutenant-Colonel Aníbal Pinho Freire (Air Force).

== Abolition ==
Constitutional Law 5/75 of 14 March 1975 abolished the National Salvation Junta and established the Revolutionary Council of Portugal (Conselho da Revolução de Portugal), which included former members of the Junta.

Preceded by Américo Tomás	President of Portugal (interim); 26 April 1974 – 15 May 1974	Succeeded by António de Spínola
Preceded by Marcello Caetano	Prime Minister of Portugal (interim); 26 April 1974 –16 May 1974	Succeeded by Adelino da Palma Carlos
