= Adelino da Palma Carlos =

Portuguese politician

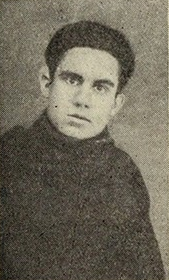

Prime Minister of Portugal
- In office 16 May 1974 – 18 July 1974
- President: António de Spínola
- Preceded by: National Salvation Junta
- Succeeded by: Vasco Gonçalves

President of the Portuguese Bar Association
- In office 1 January 1951 – 31 December 1956
- Preceded by: Artur de Morais de Carvalho
- Succeeded by: Pedro Goes Pitta

Personal details
- Born: 3 March 1905 Faro, Portugal
- Died: 25 October 1992 (aged 87) Lisbon, Portugal
- Party: Independent

Adelino da Palma Carlos, GCC, GCIH, GOL (Portuguese pronunciation: [ɐðɨˈlinu ðɐ ˈpalmɐ ˈkaɾluʃ]; Faro, 3 March 1905 – Lisbon, 25 October 1992), was a Portuguese lawyer, scholar, politician and a freemason who was the first Prime Minister of Portugal after the 25 April 1974 revolution.

== Career ==
Palma Carlos was one of at least five sons of Manuel Carlos and his wife, Auta Vaz Velho da Palma. He was an opponent of the fascist regime of the Estado Novo (New State) of António de Oliveira Salazar (and later Marcello Caetano) since his youth, and, being a liberal, rather than a socialist, was chosen by President António de Spínola, as prime minister after the 25 April 1974 revolution. He was also the 11th Head ("Bastonário") of the Portuguese Bar Association from 1951 to 1956.

His 1st Provisional Government was in power from 16 May to 18 July 1974. As an independent, he chose cabinet members from widely divergent political parties and positions, including members of the then center-left Popular Democratic Party, the Socialist Party and even the Portuguese Communist Party and the Armed Forces Movement (MFA) officers. The ideological diversity of the government seems to be one of the main reasons why the government didn't last, being the other the calling for anticipated presidential elections before Constituent Assembly election, 1975. He was replaced by Colonel Vasco Gonçalves, a choice that Spínola would later regret. After leaving office, Palma Carlos was the national representative (mandatário) of general António Ramalho Eanes for the 1980 Presidential Elections.

He was married to Elina Júlia Chaves Pereira Guimarães (Lisbon, 1904 – 1991).

Legal offices
Preceded by Artur de Morais de Carvalho	Bastonário of the Portuguese Bar Association; 1951–1956	Succeeded by Pedro Goes Pitta
Political offices
Preceded by National Salvation Junta	Prime Minister of Portugal; 1974	Succeeded by Vasco Gonçalves
