= Prime Minister of Portugal =

Head of government

Prime Minister of the Portuguese Republic
- Primeiro-Ministro da República Portuguesa
- Government logo

- Standard of the Prime Minister

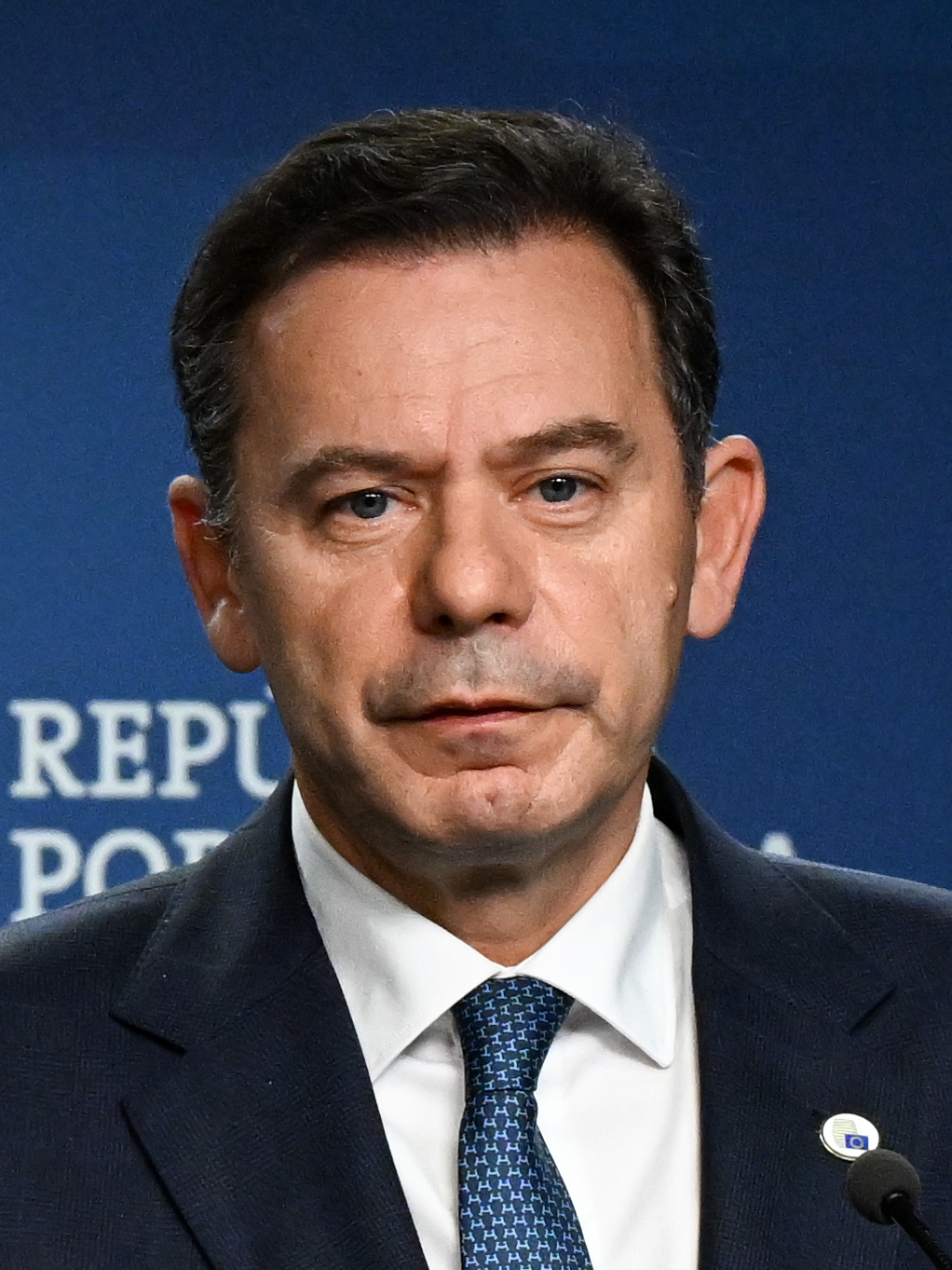
- Incumbent; Luís Montenegro since 2 April 2024
- Government of Portugal; Council of Ministers of Portugal
- Style: Mr. Prime Minister (informal - male); Madam Prime Minister (informal - female); His/Her Excellency (diplomatic)
- Type: Head of government
- Member of: Council of State; Council of Ministers; European Council
- Reports to: Parliament; President
- Residence: São Bento Mansion
- Seat: Lisbon, Portugal
- Appointer: President
- Term length: Four years no term limits
- Constituting instrument: Constitution of Portugal (1976)
- Precursor: Secretary of State
- Inaugural holder: Dom Pedro de Sousa Holstein
- Formation: 24 September 1834 (191 years ago)
- Succession: Minister appointed by the President
- Salary: €116,144 annually
- Website: portugal.gov.pt

The prime minister of Portugal (Note: Portuguese: primeiro-ministro; pronounced [pɾiˈmɐjɾu miˈniʃtɾu]) is the head of government of Portugal. As head of government, the prime minister coordinates the actions of ministers, represents the Government of Portugal to the other bodies of state, is accountable to parliament and keeps the president informed. The prime minister can hold the role of head of government with the portfolio of one or more ministries. As Portugal is a semi-presidential parliamentary republic, the prime minister is the country's leading political figure and de facto chief executive.

There is no limit to the number of terms a person can serve as prime minister. The prime minister is appointed by the president following legislative elections, after having heard the parties represented in the parliament. Usually, the person named is the leader of the largest party in the previous election, but there have been exceptions over the years.

== History ==
Since the Middle Ages, some officers of the Portuguese Crown gained precedence over the others, serving as a kind of prime ministers. Over time, the role of principal officer of the Crown fell upon the chancellor, (Note: Chanceler-mor) the mayor of the palace, (Note: Mordomo-mor) and the king's private secretary. (Note: Escrivão da puridade)

The first modern prime minister of Portugal was the 1st Duke of Palmela, who was sworn in on 24 September 1834, as president of the Council of Ministers. (Note: Presidente do Conselho de Ministros) In 1911, with the Republic, the official title of the prime minister became president of the Ministry. (Note: Presidente do Ministério) In 1933, with the Estado Novo regime, it became again president of the Council of Ministers.

The present title prime minister, (Note: Prime Minister) attributed to the head of the Government of Portugal, was officially established by the Constitution of 1976 after the revolution of 25 April 1974.

== Powers ==
Nominated by the President, the Prime Minister leads the Government, the entity that conducts all general policy of the country, with its composition being its responsibility, as well as the competencies that each ministry will have. As head of the Government, it coordinates policy action with all ministries, as well as all relations with every state body. In theory, the Prime Minister isn't hierarchically superior to the other members of the Government, however, in political terms, he is, since he is appointed by the President and any government member is proposed, and only responds, to the Prime Minister.

As the main political figure of the country, the Prime Minister is the sole executive leader, proposing policies to the Assembly of the Republic via cabinet approval, signing executive decrees (proposed by cabinet that can bypass an Assembly vote), with his acts as head of the government being scrutinized by the Assembly of the Republic on several occasions, from presenting the Government's program before MPs, through fortnightly debates where the Prime Minister is confronted on several issues, possible motions of no confidence and annual budget votes. The Prime Minister, as the conductor of the country's foreign policy, represents the country abroad (in coordination with the President) and also leads diplomatic efforts on behalf of the country.

== Officeholders ==
The incumbent prime minister of Portugal is Luís Montenegro, who took office on 2 April 2024 as the 14th prime minister of the Third Portuguese Republic.

=== Prime minister's residence ===
The official residence of the prime minister is the São Bento Mansion, a mansion next to São Bento Palace, which, in confusion, is sometimes also called "São Bento Palace".

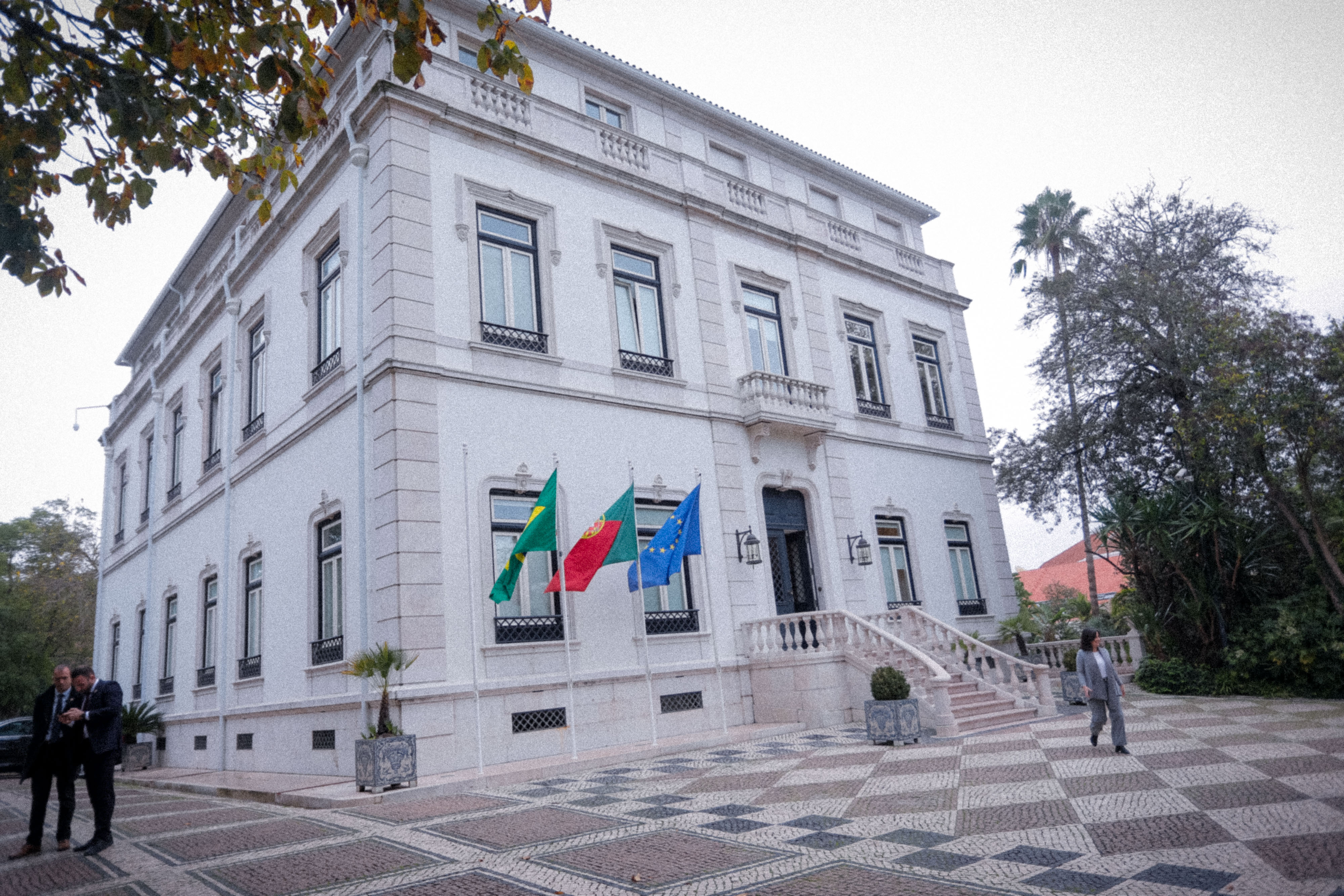
Facade of the São Bento Mansion.

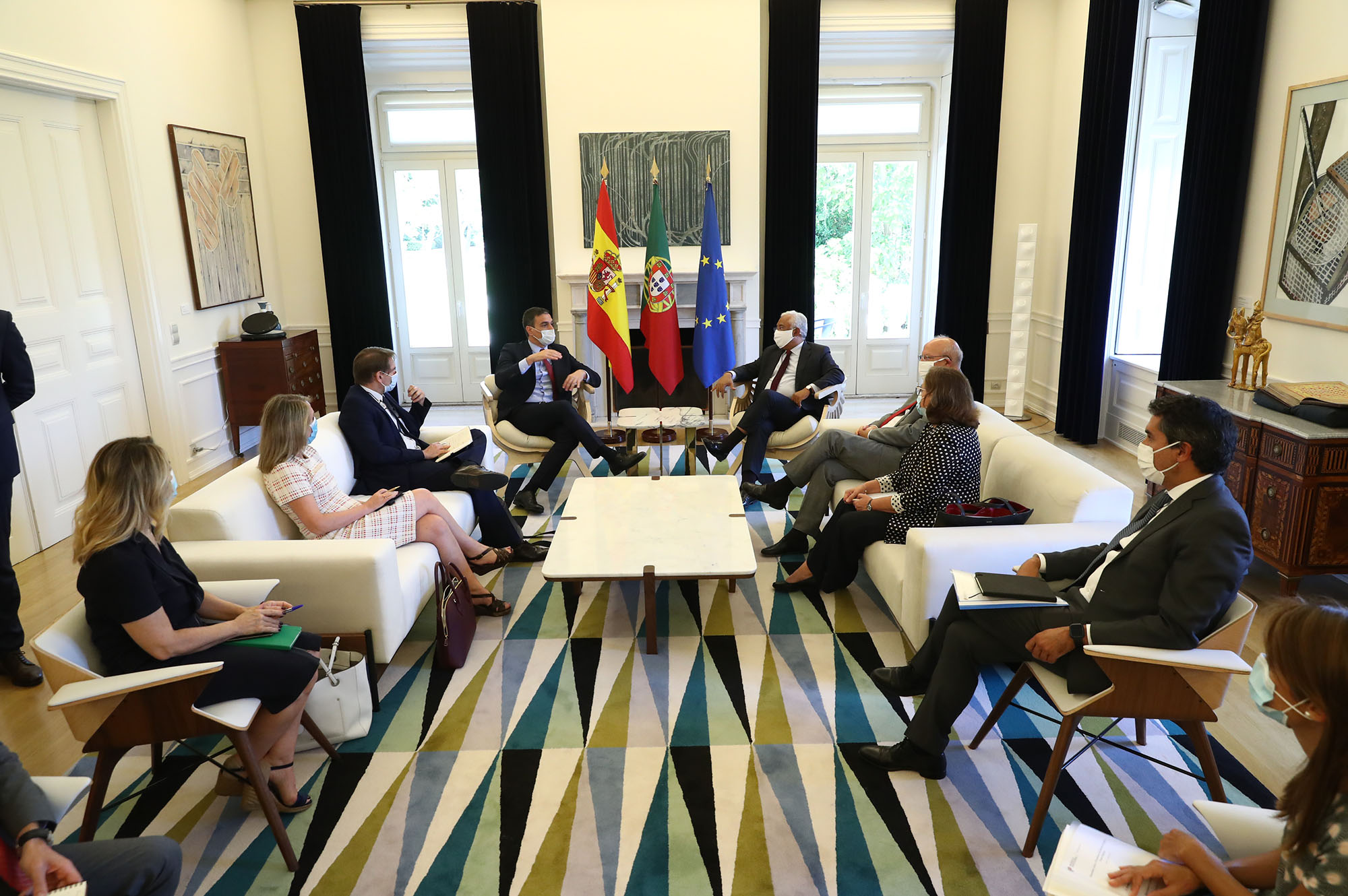
Interior of the Mansion.

Located behind the main building of the Assembly of the Republic, in the parish of Estrela, Lisbon, the mansion serves as residence and office for the prime minister of Portugal, and its family if that's the case. The mansion, dated from 1877, was built within the garden of the old monastery that held the Portuguese parliament. It has been the prime minister's official residence since 1938, when Salazar moved in. Although it is the official residence of the prime minister, not all incumbents have lived in the mansion during their term in office. Of the 17 Prime Ministers since 1974, only six used the mansion as its residence. The incumbent Prime Minister, Luís Montenegro, currently resides in the mansion.

== List of prime ministers of Portugal ==
=== Living former prime ministers of Portugal ===
Living former prime minister showing periods in office with dates of birth and age. Currently there are 7 former Prime Ministers alive:

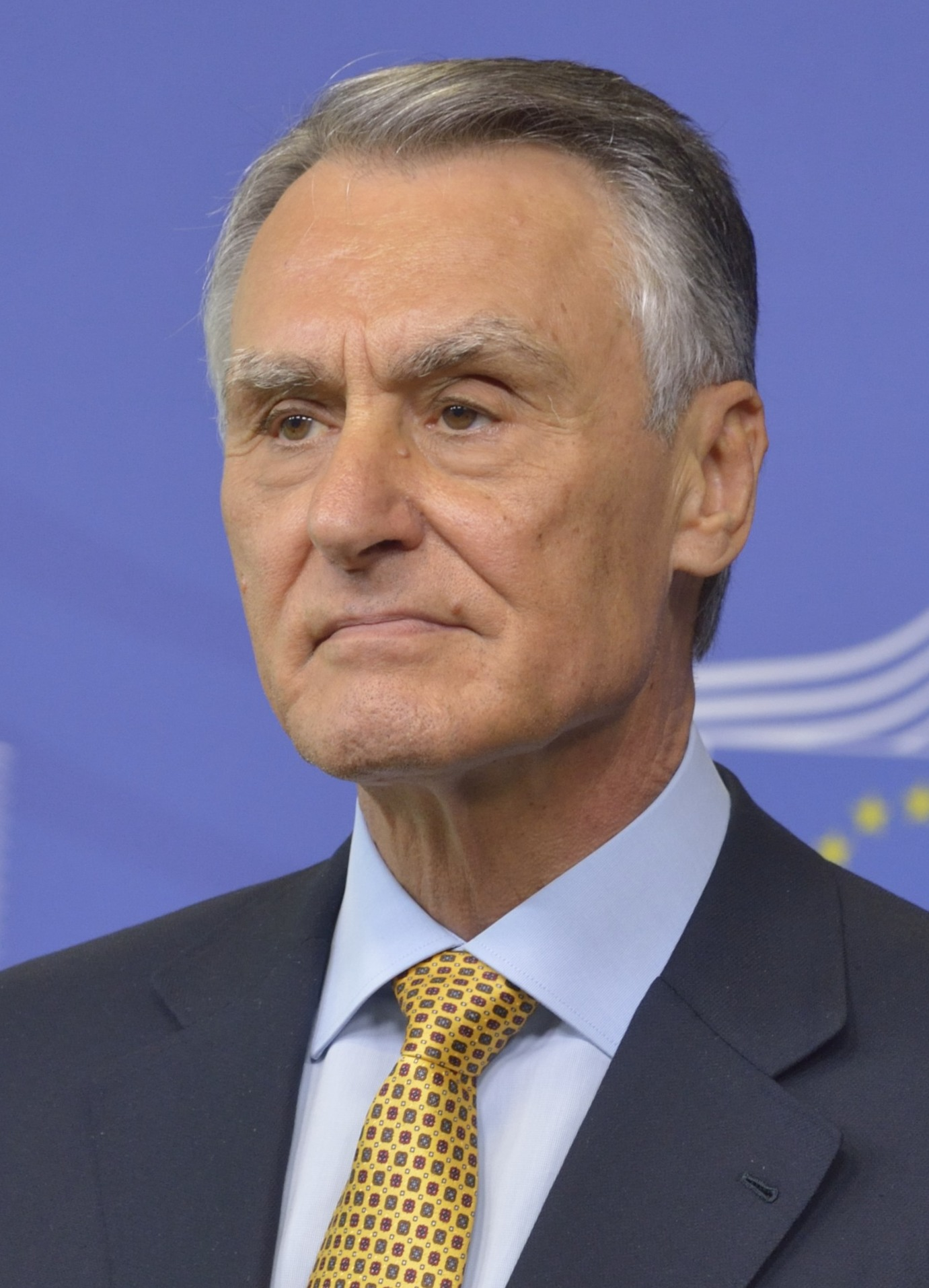
Aníbal Cavaco Silva
(1985–1995)
15 July 1939 (age 87)

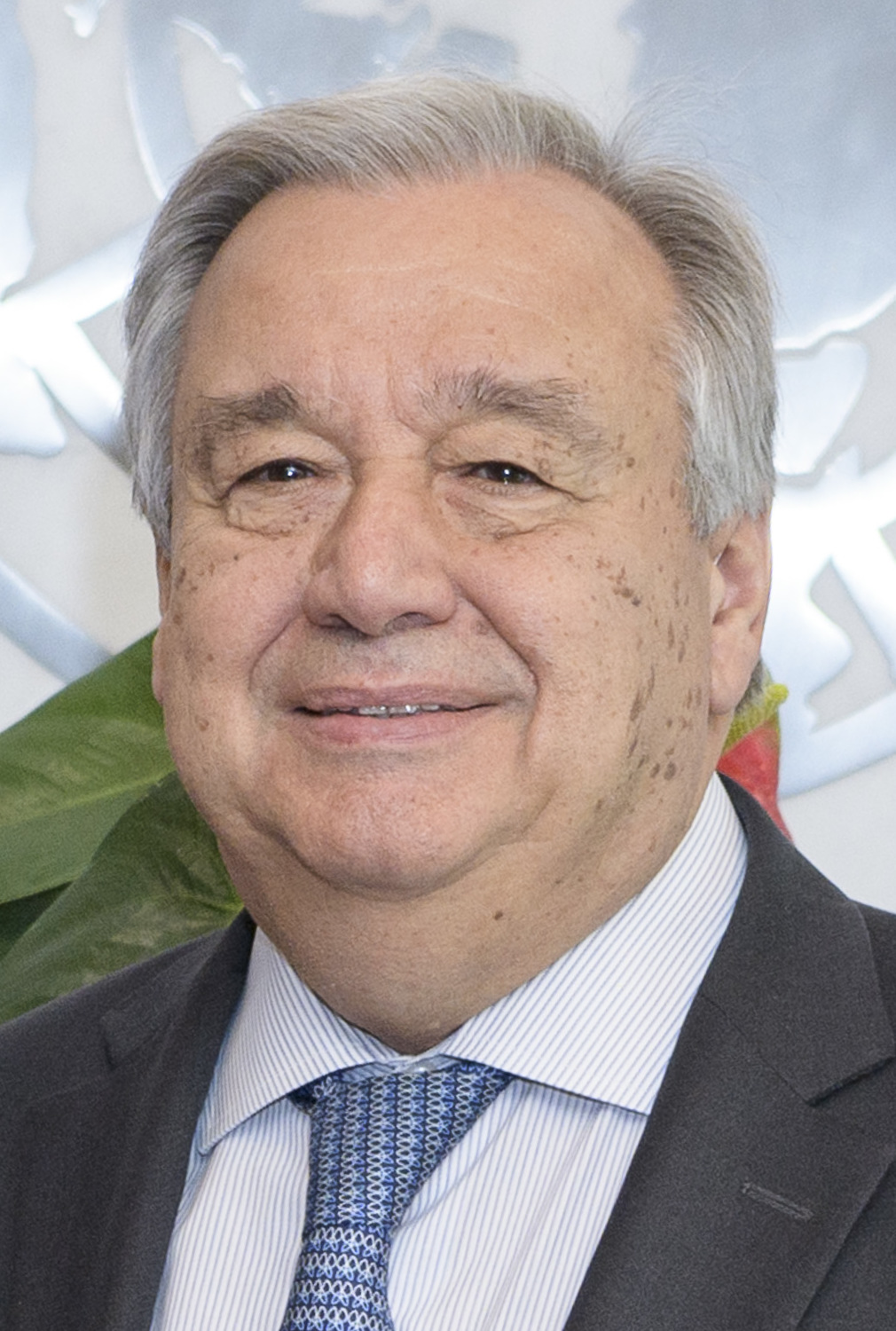
António Guterres
(1995–2002)
30 April 1949 (age 77)

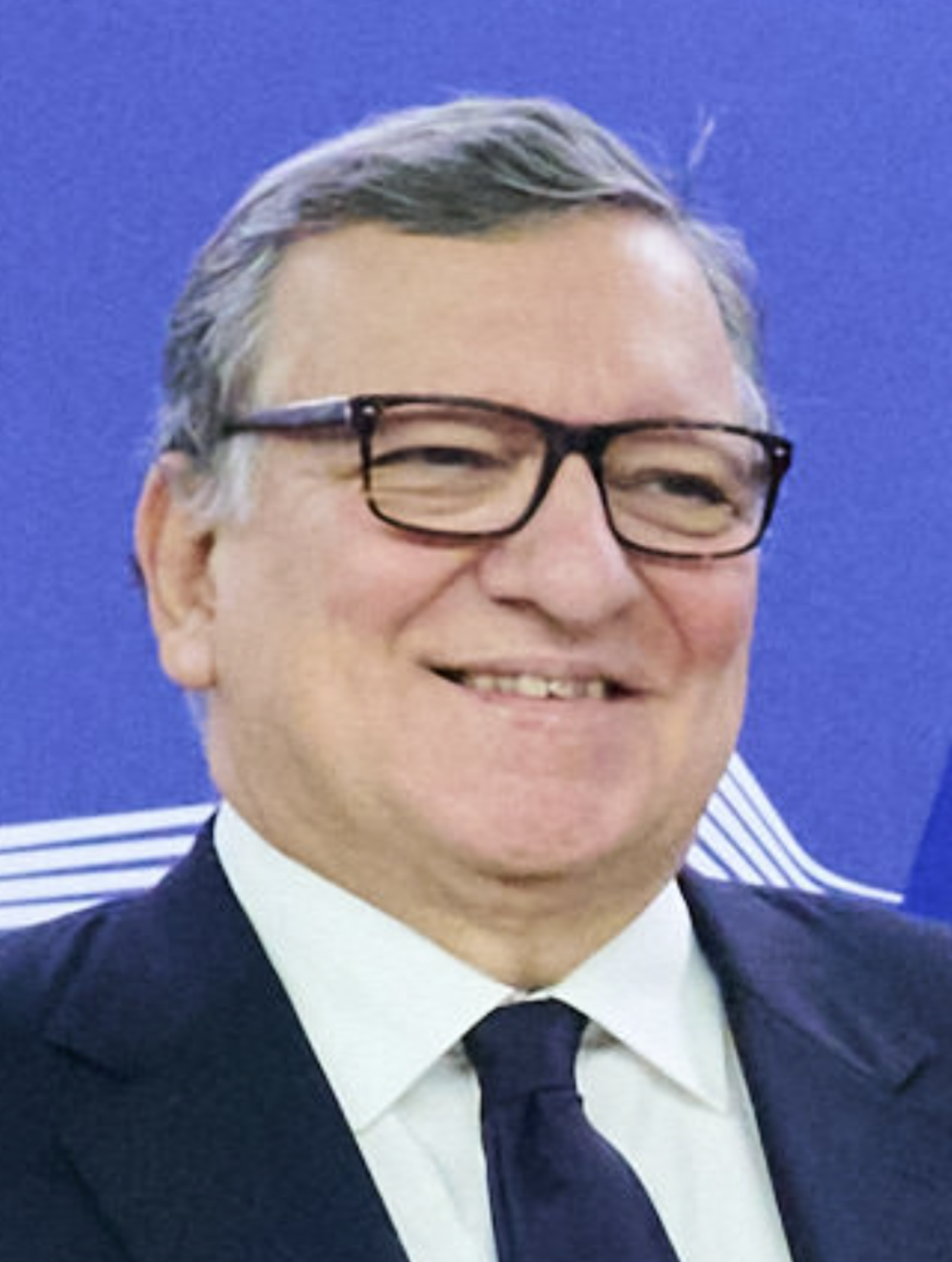
José Manuel Durão Barroso
(2002–2004)
23 March 1956 (age 70)

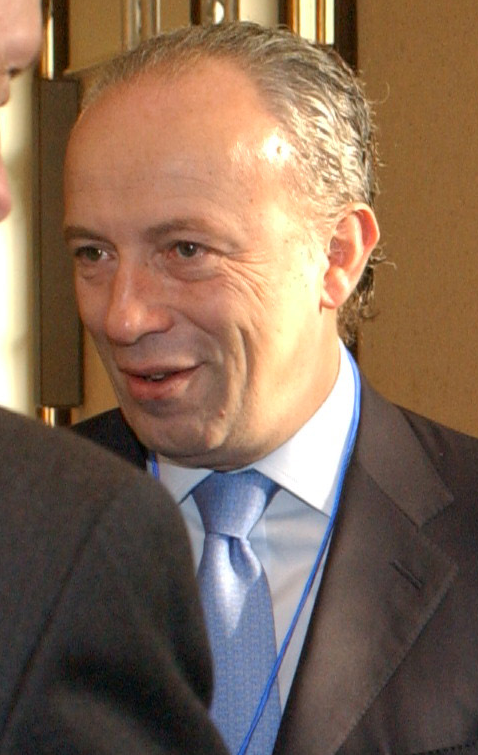
Pedro Santana Lopes
(2004–2005)
20 June 1956 (age 70)

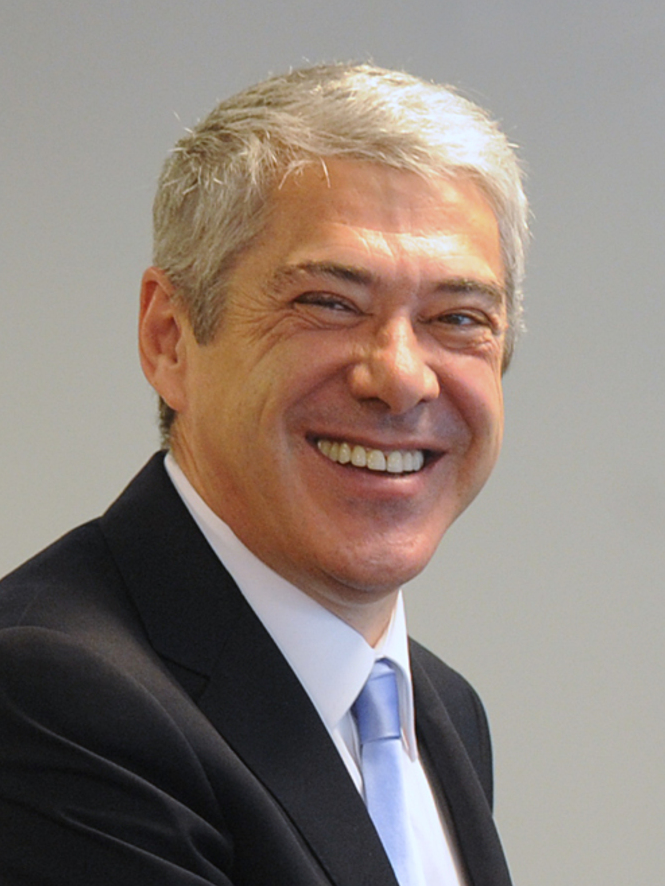
José Sócrates
(2005–2011)
6 September 1957 (age 69)

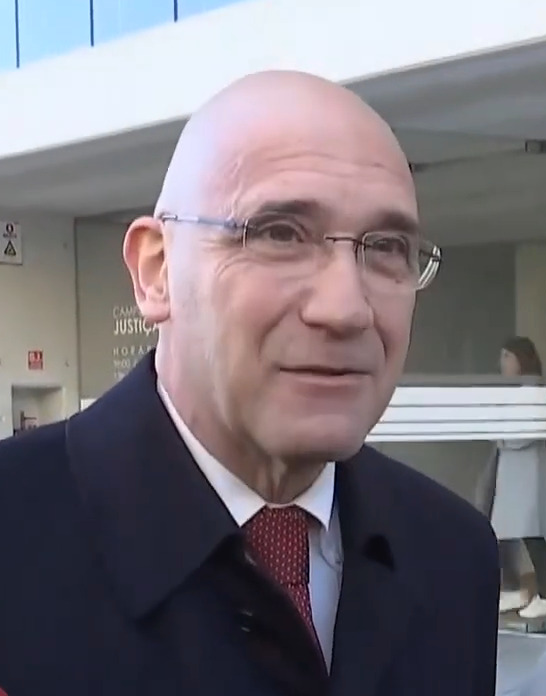
Pedro Passos Coelho
(2011–2015)
24 July 1964 (age 62)

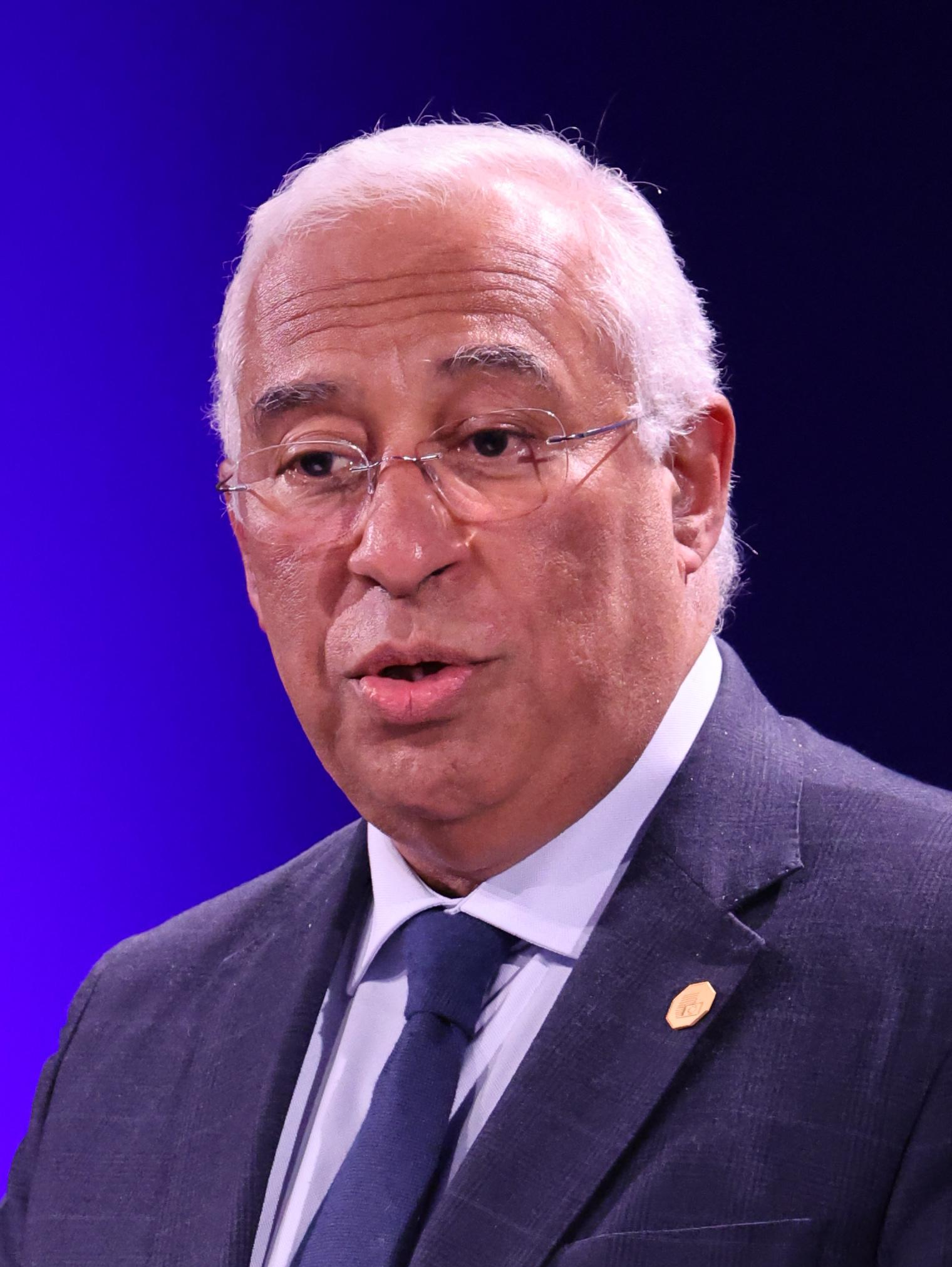
António Costa
(2015–2024)
17 July 1961 (age 65)

== Historical rankings of prime ministers ==
In 2012 and 2014 newspaper i and the polling agency Pitagórica conducted polls asking for the best Portuguese prime minister among the seven most recent ones (i.e. in the previous 30 years). The results revealed that the public clearly separated the seven evaluated prime ministers between the three best ones (each receiving more than 20% of the votes) and the four worst (each receiving from 4 to 8% of the votes). In both polls, António Guterres (1995–2002) ranked as the best prime minister. Mário Soares (1976–78 and 1983–85) and Aníbal Cavaco Silva (1985–95) were also among the best prime ministers. On the other hand, José Manuel Durão Barroso (2002–04), Pedro Santana Lopes (2004–05), José Sócrates (2005–11) and Pedro Passos Coelho (2011–15, incumbent at the time of the polls) ranked as the worst prime ministers. Pedro Santana Lopes was ranked the worst in the 2012 poll while Barroso ranked as the worst in the 2014 one. Together, the three best prime ministers ruled Portugal uninterruptedly from 1983 to 2002, while the four worst ruled from 2002 to 2015.

Rankings of prime ministers
Prime Minister	Party	Tenure	1981 Antropos	2009 GEMEO	2010 CESOP–UCP	2012 Pitagórica	2014 Pitagórica
Adelino da Palma Carlos	Ind.	1974	0.4	—N/a	—N/a	—N/a	—N/a
Vasco Gonçalves	Ind.	1975–1976	8.0	—N/a	—N/a	—N/a	—N/a
Pinheiro de Azevedo	Ind.	1976	0.8	—N/a	—N/a	—N/a	—N/a
Mário Soares	PS	1976–1978; 1983–1985	15.2	—N/a	19.8	22.7	23.9
Alfredo Nobre da Costa	Ind.	1978	1.0	—N/a	—N/a	—N/a	—N/a
Carlos Mota Pinto	Ind.	1978–1979	1.0	—N/a	0.6	—N/a	—N/a
Maria de Lourdes Pintasilgo	Ind.	1979–1980	13.4	—N/a	2.3	—N/a	—N/a
Francisco Sá Carneiro	PSD	1980	37.4	—N/a	13.7	—N/a	—N/a
Francisco Pinto Balsemão	PSD	1981–1983	1.8	—N/a	1.1	—N/a	—N/a
Aníbal Cavaco Silva	PSD	1985–1995	—N/a	30	32.6	23.7	23.6
António Guterres	PS	1995–2002	—N/a	6	10.4	26.8	24.2
José Manuel Durão Barroso	PSD	2002–2004	—N/a	8	9.4	8.1	6.7
Pedro Santana Lopes	PSD	2004–2005	—N/a	1	0.6	4.0	6.9
José Sócrates	PS	2005–2011	—N/a	16	8.2	6.2	7.7
Pedro Passos Coelho	PSD	2011–2015	—N/a	—N/a	—N/a	8.4	6.8
António Costa	PS	2015–2024	—N/a	—N/a	—N/a	—N/a	—N/a
Luís Montenegro	PSD	2024–present	—N/a	—N/a	—N/a	—N/a	—N/a

== See also ==
- Leader of the Opposition (Portugal)
- Deputy Prime Minister of Portugal
- President of Portugal
