= Diogo Neto =

Portuguese footballer

Personal information
- Full name: Diogo Henrique Gomes Neto
- Date of birth: 11 November 1999 (age 27)
- Place of birth: Cascais, Portugal
- Height: 1.66 m (5 ft 5 1/2 in)
- Position: Attacking midfielder

Team information
- Current team: ASIL Lysi
- Number: 8

Youth career
- 2007–2008: Talaíde
- 2008–2010: Atlético Cacém
- 2010–2011: Belenenses
- 2011–2014: Estoril Praia
- 2014–2015: 1º Dezembro
- 2015–2018: Aves

Senior career*
Years	Team	Apps	(Gls)
2018–2019	Sporting Covilhã	2	(0)
2019–2020	Gondomar B	14	(0)
2020–2021	Olympias Lympion	16	(1)
2021–2022	Omonia Aradippou	19	(0)
2022	Ermionida		
2023	Merelinense	11	(1)
2023–2024	Portosantense	20	(0)
2024–	ASIL Lysi	43	(3)
- * Club domestic league appearances and goals as of 3 May 2026

Diogo Henrique Gomes Neto (born 11 November 1999) is a Portuguese professional footballer who plays for Cypriot club ASIL Lysi as a midfielder.

== Football career ==
On 4 november 2018, Neto made his professional debut with Sporting Covilhã in a 2018–19 LigaPro match against Oliveirense.
