= Francisco da Costa Gomes =

President of Portugal From 1974 to 1976

His Excellency Francisco da Costa Gomes ComTE • GOA
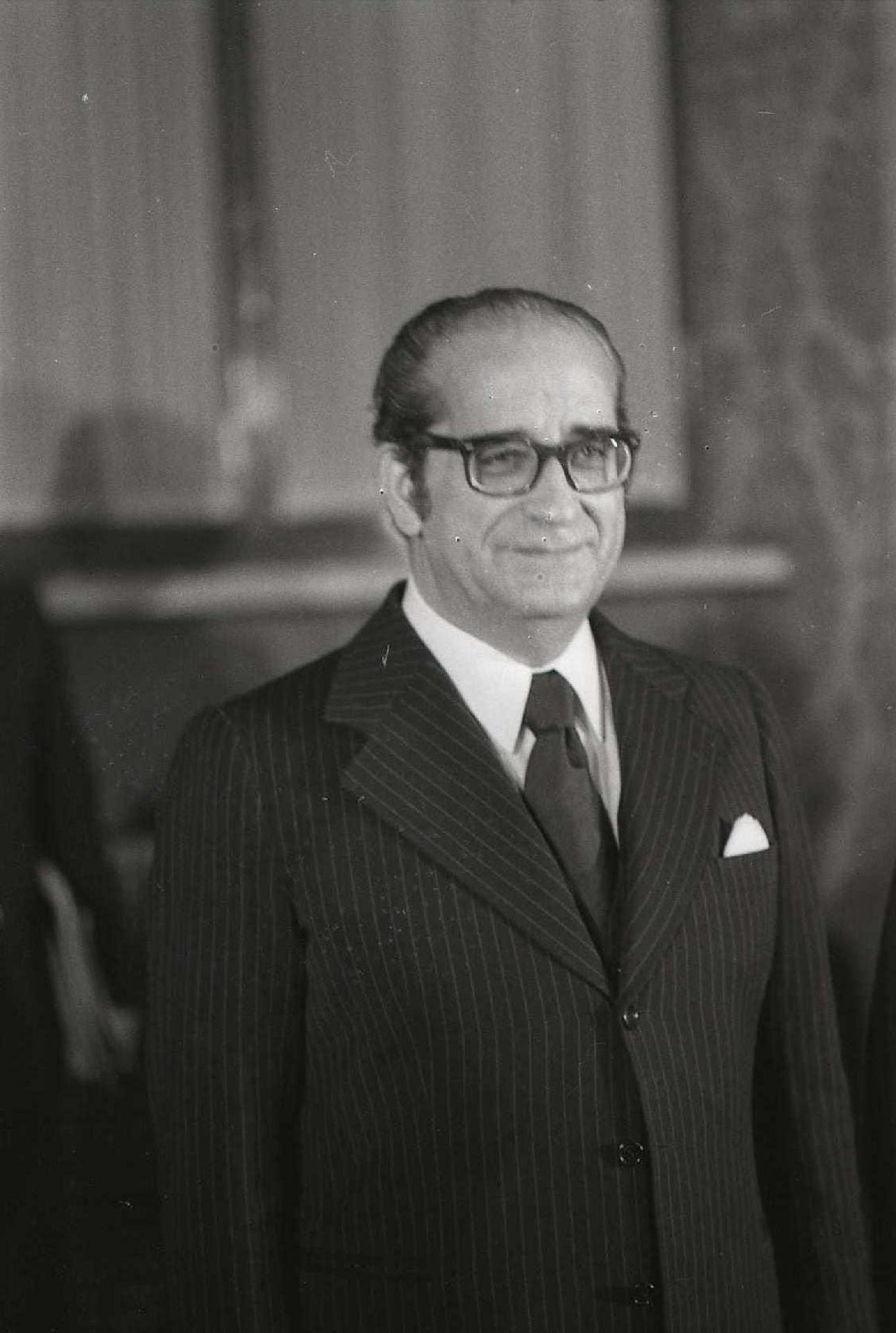
- Gomes in 1975

President of Portugal
- In office 30 September 1974 – 13 July 1976
- Prime Minister: Vasco Gonçalves; José Pinheiro de Azevedo
- Preceded by: António de Spínola
- Succeeded by: António Ramalho Eanes

President of the Revolutionary Council
- In office 14 March 1975 – 13 July 1976
- Preceded by: Office established
- Succeeded by: António Ramalho Eanes

President of the National Salvation Junta
- In office 30 September 1974 – 14 March 1975
- Preceded by: António de Spínola
- Succeeded by: Office abolished

Chief of the Armed Forces General Staff
- In office 29 April 1974 – 30 July 1976
- Preceded by: Joaquim da Luz Cunha
- Succeeded by: António Ramalho Eanes
- In office 15 September 1972 – 19 March 1974
- Preceded by: Venâncio Augusto Deslandes
- Succeeded by: Joaquim da Luz Cunha

Personal details
- Born: 30 June 1914 Chaves, Portugal
- Died: 31 July 2001 (aged 87) Lisbon, Portugal
- Resting place: Alto de São João Cemetery
- Party: Independent
- Spouse: Maria Estela Veloso de Antas Varajão (m. 1952)
- Children: 1
- Education: University of Porto
- Portfolio: Military Region of Angola

Military service
- Allegiance: Portugal
- Branch/service: Portuguese Army
- Years of service: 1931–1976
- Rank: General (effective); Field Marshal (honorific)
- Battles/wars: Portuguese Colonial War

Francisco da Costa Gomes, ComTE GOA (Portuguese pronunciation: [fɾɐ̃ˈsiʃku ðɐ ˈkɔʃtɐ ˈɣomɨʃ]; 30 June 1914 – 31 July 2001) was a Portuguese military officer and politician who was the president of Portugal from 1974 to 1976. Earlier on, he had been deployed to Angola as part of the Portuguese Colonial War.

== Biography ==
Gomes was born in Chaves, Portugal, on 30 June 1914. He was one of the eleven children of António José Gomes and Idalina Júlia Monteiro da Costa.

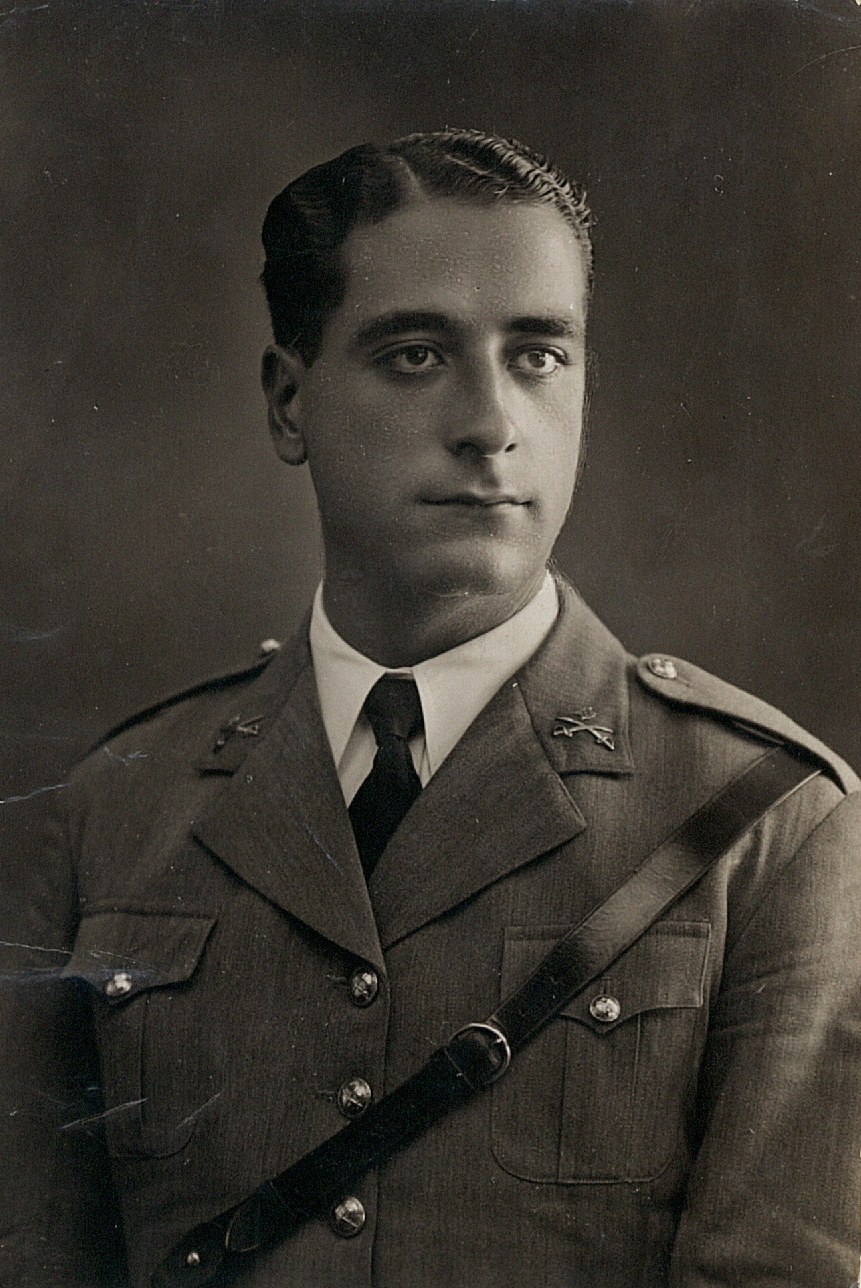
Gomes in the 1940s

On 8 December 1952, Gomes married Maria Estela Veloso de Antas Varajão, daughter of João de Campos Varajão and his wife Angélica Martins Veloso, at the Cathedral of Viana do Castelo. The couple had only one son, Francisco da Costa Gomes.

In 1961, Gomes, acting as under-secretary of state for the Army, was involved in a constitutional "coup d'état" headed by the Minister of Defence, General Júlio Botelho Moniz, that tried to convince President Américo Tomás to remove an aged António de Oliveira Salazar from the premiership.

In 1970 he occupied the post of Commander of the Military Region of Angola, where he overhauled the chief-command and was the first to try to establish a military agreement with the National Union for the Total Independence of Angola (UNITA) against the People's Movement for the Liberation of Angola (MPLA) and the National Liberation Front of Angola (FNLA). However, during his tenure in Angola, Gomes also resorted to chemical warfare in forested zones. This took place in a period that saw Portugal come increasingly under the influence of the US (then led by Richard Nixon) which itself used similar tactics in the Vietnam War.

On 12 September 1972, Gomes was called back to Portugal to occupy the post of Chief of the Armed Forces—replacing General Venâncio Augusto Deslandes—but he was replaced in March 1974 for refusing to swear his loyalty to the President of the Council of Ministers Marcelo Caetano in a public ceremony.

After the Carnation Revolution on 25 April, Gomes was one of the seven military leaders who made up the National Salvation Junta. Between 25 April and 30 September, he was the second-in-command of Portugal behind António de Spínola. He became Chief of the Armed Forces General Staff again on 30 April 1974.

Following Spinola's resignation on 30 September 1974, Gomes was named as the President of the Republic by the reorganised Junta and served until 13 July 1976, when he was succeeded by General António Ramalho Eanes, who won the 1976 Portuguese presidential election. During his presidency, Portugal faced a turbulent period known as the Ongoing Revolutionary Process. Despite the ambiguity of his position, he was recognised for having prevented a potential civil war. He received an honorary promotion to Field Marshal in 1982.

Gomes died of respiratory failure at the age of 87 at the Lisbon Military Hospital on 31 July 2001. He was buried in the Alto de São João Cemetery.

== Honours ==
=== National ===
- Grand Cross of the Order of Liberty (GCL, 5 July 2023) (posthumously)
- Grand Cross of the Sash of the Three Orders (30 September 1974 – 13 July 1976)
- Commander of the Military Order of the Tower and Sword (ComTE, 2 November 1972)
- Grand Officer of the Military Order of Aviz (GOA, 20 August 1971)
- Commander of the Military Order of Aviz (ComA, 28 December 1953)
- Officer of the Military Order of Aviz (OA, 16 September 1950)

=== Foreign ===
- Brazil: Grand Collar of the Order of the Southern Cross (21 November 1972)
- France: Grand Cross of the National Order of Legion of Honour (20 May 1976)
- Libya: Recipient of the Order of the Great Conqueror (20 October 1975)
- North Korea: First Class of the Order of the National Flag (20 November 1975)
- Poland: Grand Cross of the Order of Merit of the Polish People's Republic (7 May 1976)
- Romania: First Class of the Order of the Star of the Romanian Socialist Republic (14 June 1975)
- Senegal: Grand Cross of the National Order of the Lion (6 July 1976)
- Yugoslavia: Great Star of the Order of the Yugoslav Star (29 April 1976)

== Sources ==
- Centro de Documentação 25 de Abril da Universidade de Coimbra (2014). Costa Gomes, O Último Marechal [Costa Gomes the last Marshall] (in Portuguese). Lisbon: D. Quixote. ISBN 978-972-20-5518-5.
- Rodrigues, Luís Nuno (2008). Marechal Costa Gomes, No centro da tempestade [Marshall Costa Gomes, in the epicenter of the storm] (in Portuguese). Lisbon: Esfera dos Livros. ISBN 978-989-626-103-0.
- "Costa Gomes". Presidency of the Portuguese Republic.

== See also ==
- List of presidents of Portugal
- Estado Novo (Portugal)
- History of Portugal
- Timeline of Portuguese history
- Politics of Portugal

Political offices
Preceded by António de Spínola	President of Portugal; 1974–1976	Succeeded by Ramalho Eanes
