= ISO 3166-2:PT =

Entry for Portugal in ISO 3166-2

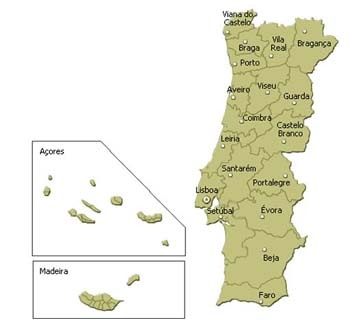
Map of mainland Portugal and the autonomous regions.

ISO 3166-2:PT is the entry for Portugal in ISO 3166-2, part of the ISO 3166 standard published by the International Organization for Standardization (ISO), which defines codes for the names of the principal subdivisions (e.g., provinces or states) of all countries coded in ISO 3166-1.

Currently for Portugal, ISO 3166-2 codes are defined for 18 districts and two autonomous regions.

Each code consists of two parts separated by a hyphen. The first part is PT, the ISO 3166-1 alpha-2 code of Portugal. The second part is two digits:

- 01–18: districts
- 20 and 30: autonomous regions (Azores and Madeira)

== Current codes ==
Subdivision names are listed as in the ISO 3166-2 standard published by the ISO 3166 Maintenance Agency (ISO 3166/MA).

Code	Subdivision name (pt)	Subdivision name (en) (Note: For reference only, English name not included in the ISO 3166-2 standard.)	Subdivision category
PT-01	Aveiro	Aveiro	district
PT-02	Beja	Beja	district
PT-03	Braga	Braga	district
PT-04	Bragança	Bragança	district
PT-05	Castelo Branco	White Castle	district
PT-06	Coimbra	Coimbra	district
PT-07	Évora	Evora	district
PT-08	Faro	Faro	district
PT-09	Guarda	Guarda	district
PT-10	Leiria	Leiria	district
PT-11	Lisboa	Lisbon	district
PT-12	Portalegre	Portalegre	district
PT-13	Porto	Porto	district
PT-30	Região Autónoma da Madeira	Madeira	autonomous region
PT-20	Região Autónoma dos Açores	Azores	autonomous region
PT-14	Santarém	Santarém	district
PT-15	Setúbal	Setúbal	district
PT-16	Viana do Castelo	Viana do Castelo	district
PT-17	Vila Real	Royal Town	district
PT-18	Viseu	Viseu	district

== See also ==
- Subdivisions of Portugal
- FIPS region codes of Portugal
- NUTS codes of Portugal
- Neighbouring country: ES
