= José Baptista Pinheiro de Azevedo =

Portuguese politician (1917–1983)

José Pinheiro de Azevedo

Prime Minister of Portugal
- In office 19 September 1975 – 23 June 1976
- President: Francisco da Costa Gomes
- Preceded by: Vasco Gonçalves
- Succeeded by: Mário Soares

Minister of National Defence
- In office 19 September 1975 – 23 July 1976
- Prime Minister: Himself
- Preceded by: Silvano Ribeiro
- Succeeded by: Mário Firmino Miguel

Chief of the Navy General Staff
- In office 26 April 1974 – 28 November 1975
- Preceded by: Armando Júlio de Roboredo e Silva
- Succeeded by: António Egídio de Sousa Leitão

Personal details
- Born: 5 June 1917 Luanda, Portuguese Angola
- Died: 10 August 1983 (aged 66) Lisbon, Portugal
- Party: Independent (before 1976); Christian Democratic (from 1976)
- Education: Portuguese Navy School
- Occupation: Naval officer

Military service
- Allegiance: Portugal
- Branch/service: Portuguese Navy
- Years of service: 1937–1976
- Rank: Admiral

Admiral José Baptista Pinheiro de Azevedo GCL (Portuguese pronunciation: [ʒuˈzɛ βaˈtiʃtɐ piˈɲɐjɾu ðɨ ɐzɨˈveðu]; 5 June 1917 – 10 August 1983) was a Portuguese political figure, reformer and revolutionary. He helped overthrow Marcelo Caetano in 1974. He served as the 104th prime minister of Portugal between 19 September 1975 and 23 June 1976. He ran for president in 1976, and lost.

== Biography ==
Pinheiro de Azevedo was born on 5 June 1917 in Luanda, but moved to Portugal several years later. In the 1960s, he joined the Movement for Democratic Unity and was a supporter of the Presidential candidacies of José Norton de Matos, Manuel Quintão Meireles and Humberto Delgado.

Pinheiro de Azevedo served in the Portuguese Colonial War, as an admiral in charge of the maritime defense of Portuguese Angola.

After the Revolution of 25 April 1974, he was appointed to the National Salvation Junta, and was committed to the cause of democratization in Portugal.

On 29 August 1975 he became Prime Minister of the Sixth Provisional Government replacing ousted prime minister Vasco Gonçalves.

At the end of his tenure as prime minister, he was replaced for the final 30 days by Vasco Almeida e Costa, Minister of Internal Administration. Pinheiro had suffered a heart attack on 23 June while campaigning in Porto for the Portuguese presidency as one of the independent candidates in the 27 June presidential election. He was taken to a hospital and was still recovering when President António Ramalho Eanes appointed Mario Soares as the new premier.

== Electoral history ==
=== Presidential election, 1976 ===
Ballot: 27 June 1976
Candidate	Votes	%
António Ramalho Eanes	2,967,137	61.6
Otelo Saraiva de Carvalho	792,760	16.5
José Pinheiro de Azevedo	692,147	14.4
Octávio Pato	365,586	7.6
Blank/Invalid ballots	63,495	–
Turnout	4,881,125	75.47
Source: Comissão Nacional de Eleições

Military offices
Preceded by Armando Júlio de Roboredo e Silva	Chief of the General Staff of the Navy; 1974–1975	Succeeded by António Egídio de Sousa Leitão
Political offices
Preceded by Silvano Ribeiro	Minister of National Defence; 1975–1976	Succeeded by Mário Firmino Miguel
Preceded by Vasco Gonçalves	Prime Minister of Portugal; 1975–1976	Succeeded by Mário Soares
