= Vasco Gonçalves =

Former Prime Minister of Portugal

Vasco Gonçalves GOL OA
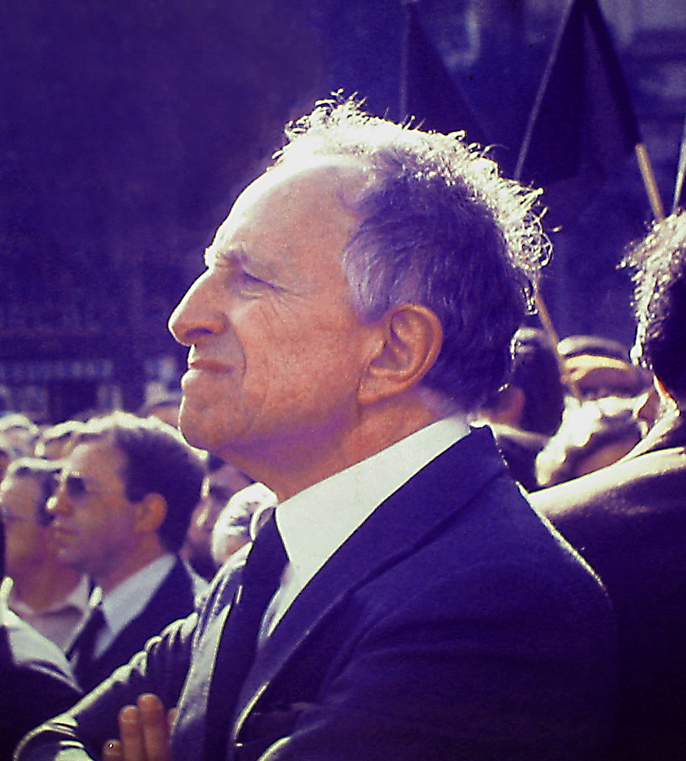

Prime Minister of Portugal
- In office 18 July 1974 – 19 September 1975
- President: António de Spínola; Francisco da Costa Gomes
- Deputy: José Teixeira Ribeiro; António Arnão Metello
- Preceded by: Adelino da Palma Carlos
- Succeeded by: José Pinheiro de Azevedo

Personal details
- Born: Vasco dos Santos Gonçalves; 3 May 1921 Lisbon, Portugal
- Died: 11 June 2005 (aged 84) Almancil, Portugal
- Party: Independent
- Spouse: Aida da Rocha Afonso (m. 1950)
- Children: 1 daughter and 1 son
- Education: Portuguese Military Academy
- Profession: Army officer
- Civilian awards: Order of Liberty (posthumous); Order of Playa Girón

Military service
- Allegiance: Portugal
- Branch/service: Portuguese Army
- Years of service: 1942–1975
- Rank: General
- Battles/wars: Portuguese Colonial War; Armed Forces Movement; Carnation Revolution
- Military awards: Military Order of Aviz

General Vasco dos Santos Gonçalves GOL OA (Portuguese pronunciation: [ˈvaʃku ɣõˈsalvɨʃ]; Lisbon 3 May 1921 – 11 June 2005) was a Portuguese army officer in the Engineering Corps who took part in the Carnation Revolution and later served as Prime Minister from 18 July 1974 to 19 September 1975.

== Early life ==
Vasco dos Santos Gonçalves was born on 3 May 1921, in Sintra, Portugal. His father, Vítor Gonçalves, was an amateur footballer turned foreign exchange dealer. He graduated from the Portuguese military academy as an engineer in 1942. Gonçalves married, in 1950, Aida Rocha Afonso, with whom he had a son, Vitor, and a daughter, Maria João.

In 1942, Gonçalves graduated from a Portuguese military academy in the Army Engineering Corps. As an officer, Gonçalves served in Portuguese Goa, and spent part of his military career in the Portuguese overseas territories of Angola and Mozambique.

In 1973, Gonçalves joined the Armed Forces Movement and was involved in the planning of the overthrow of the Estado Novo regime. The president of Portugal António de Spínola described him as "the brain" of the movement.

== Political career ==
Gonçalves's tenure as Prime Minister of Portugal was marked by political turmoil and instability. The PM oversaw the transition of the Portugal into a democracy known as the Processo Revolucionário Em Curso or the Ongoing Revolutionary Process.

Early in March 1975, Gonçalves's leadership was challenged by a right-wing coup attempt which ultimately failed. Emboldened by this, the prime minister proceeded to nationalize all Portuguese-owned capital in the banking, insurance, petrochemical, fertilizer, tobacco, cement, and wood pulp sectors of the economy, as well as the Portuguese iron and steel company, major breweries, large shipping lines, most public transport, two of the three principal shipyards, core companies of the Companhia União Fabril (CUF) conglomerate, radio and TV networks (except that of the Roman Catholic Church), and important companies in the glass, mining, fishing, and agricultural sectors.

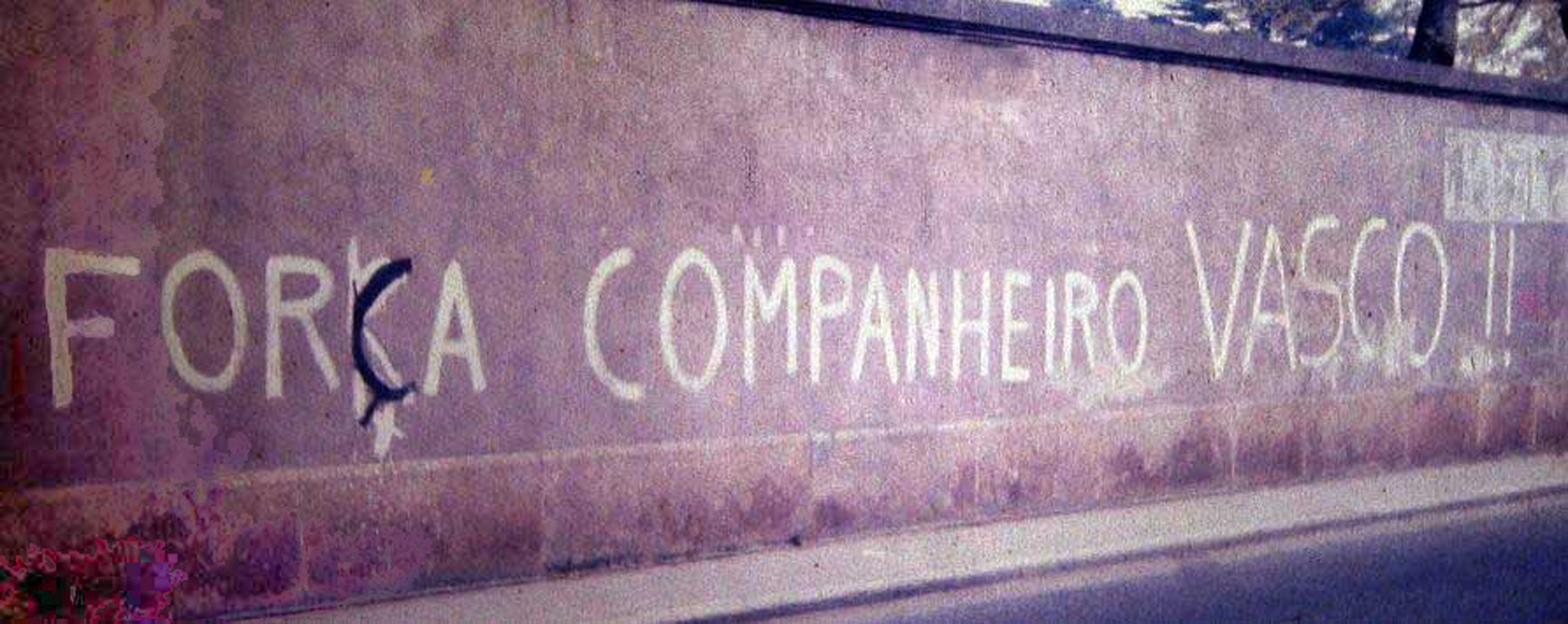
A mural in support of Vasco Gonçalves.

In April 1975, the Socialist Party and its allies gained a majority in the provisional constituent assembly; they quickly denounced Gonçalves, whom they accused of left-wing extremism, and they began a series of campaigns of civil disobedience against Gonçalves' government. On 18 August, Gonçalves delivered an impassioned speech decrying his political opponents. The tone of this speech raised doubts about his sanity and two weeks later, amid a growing threat of civil war, President Francisco da Costa Gomes dismissed Gonçalves.

Gonçalves' dismissal was met with heavy opposition from the radical Portuguese left, most notably from the Portuguese Workers' Communist Party, which organized mass demonstrations in Lisbon in September 1975.

== Later life ==
After his tenure as prime minister, Gonçalves retired from politics and would occasionally attend rallies in support of movements from the left. His last public appearance was in 2004 at an event with Portuguese prime minister José Manuel Durão Barroso.

While remaining independent throughout his life, Gonçalves identified as a Marxist.

Vasco dos Santos Gonçalves died on 11 June 2005 at the age of 84 after drowning in his brother's swimming pool due to cardiac complications.

== Honours and awards ==
=== National honours ===
- Officer of the Military Order of Aviz (1 April 1961)
- Grand Officer of the Order of Liberty (16 May 2023; posthumously)

=== Foreign honours ===
- (Cuba) Order of Playa Girón (9 July 2003)

Political offices
Preceded by Adelino da Palma Carlos	Prime Minister of Portugal; 1974–1975	Succeeded by José Pinheiro de Azevedo
