= António Alva Rosa Coutinho =

Portuguese admiral and political activist (1926–2010)

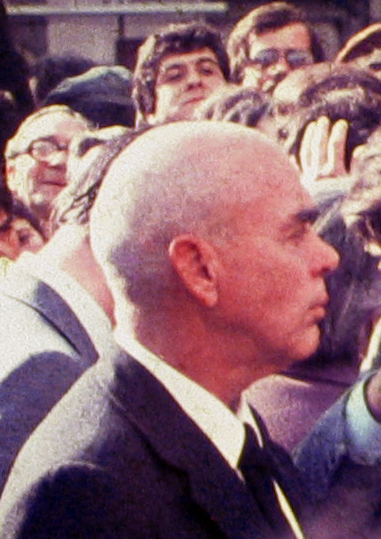
- Coutinho in Porto in 1982
- Born: 14 February 1926; Lisbon, Portugal
- Died: 2 June 2010 (aged 84)
- Occupations: Admiral; political activist
- Political party: Portuguese Communist Party

António Alva Rosa Coutinho (14 February 1926 – 2 June 2010) was a Portuguese admiral, political activist, and participant in the Carnation Revolution.

== Biography ==
Coutinho was born in Lisbon.

As an officer of the Portuguese navy, Rosa Coutinho spent most of his career on board—and occasionally, in command of—hydrographic surveying ships. During the 1960s, on patrol in the Zaire River, he was captured by guerrillas of the National Liberation Front of Angola and held captive for a few months.

During the Carnation Revolution (25 April 1974) he was one of the officers who made up the Junta de Salvação Nacional (JSN), and was subsequently promoted from captain to vice-admiral. He was not a particularly significant figure in the first few months after the restoration of democracy, but he soon gained prominence as the official in charge of the dismantlement of the PIDE and the Portuguese Legion.

At the end of July 1974, after the resignation of the last Governor General of Angola, general Silvino Silvério Marques, Rosa Coutinho succeeded him as president of the Council of Governors of Angola. In September he was confirmed in this position by the National Defence Council, becoming High Commissioner of Angola. He would remain in this position until the signing of the Alvor Agreement (January 1975) between the Portuguese and the three competing liberation movements—the FNLA, the MPLA, and UNITA. His actions in Angola tended to be seen as favourable towards the MPLA. Coutinho defended the territorial integrity of Angola against the Zairean-backed Front for the Liberation of the Enclave of Cabinda, and openly distributed Portuguese arms and equipment to the MPLA.

Rosa Coutinho's role in the Angolan independence process and his subsequent closeness to the Portuguese Communist Party earned him the nickname "the Red Admiral" (in Portuguese: o almirante vermelho). In the early part of 1975 he began to advocate the passage of "revolutionary laws" with the aim of radicalizing the political process that had been initiated by the Carnation Revolution. These aspirations came to fruition in March of that year, when he joined the newly formed Revolutionary Council. Notwithstanding his reputation as a radical, he remained loyal to the government during the attempted coup d'état on 25 November 1975. Afterward, he was removed from the Revolutionary Council and relegated to the naval reserve. Though he no longer exerted much influence in politics, he remained involved in the Angolan solidarity movement and continued to campaign in support of Portuguese left-wing parties.

== See also ==
- List of kidnappings (1960–1969)
- List of solved missing person cases (1950–1969)
