= Order of Liberty =

National civil order of Portugal

Order of Liberty Ordem da Liberdade
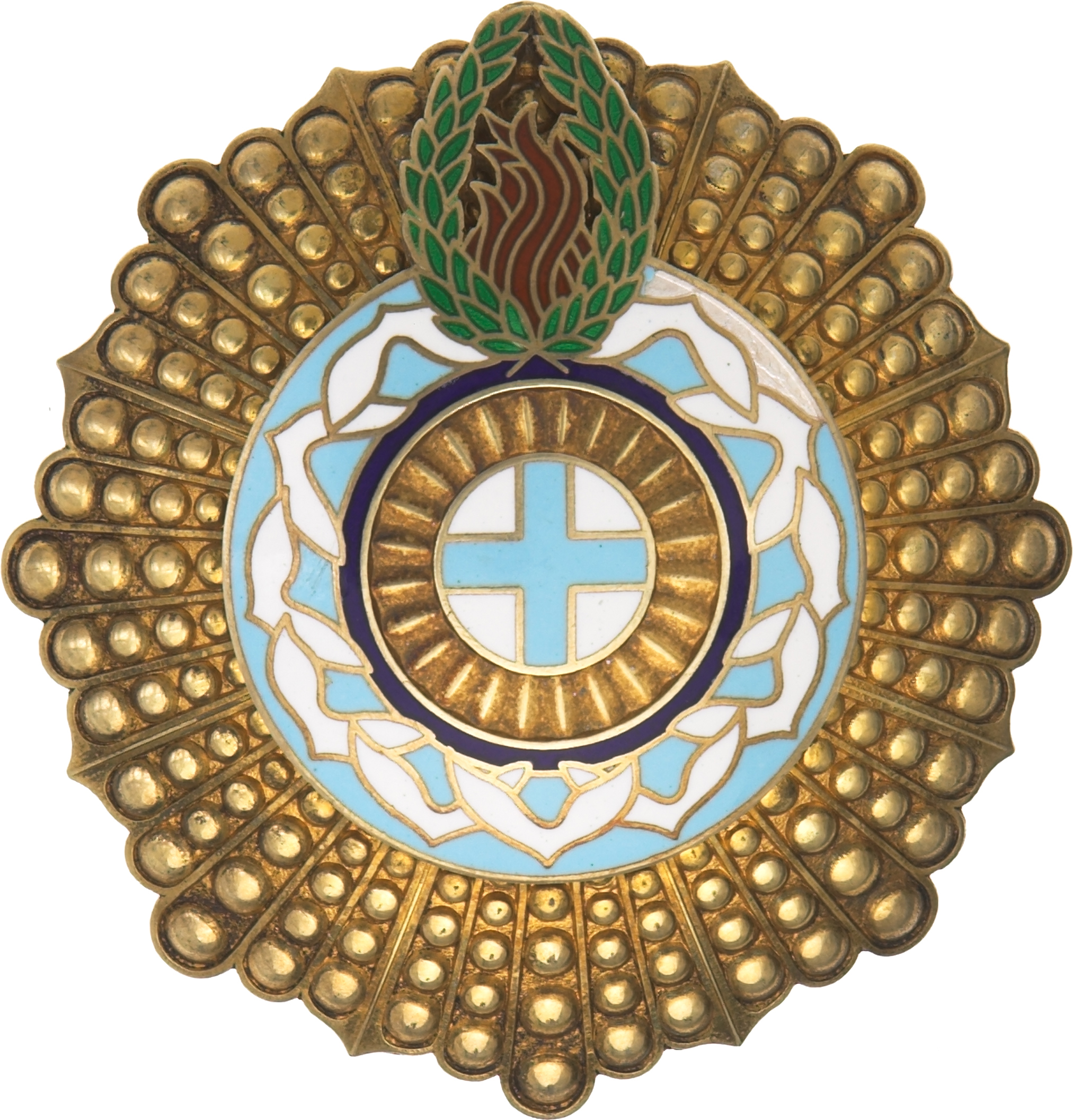
- Star of The Order of Liberty

Awarded by Portuguese Republic
- Type: Order
- Established: 1976
- Eligibility: Portuguese and foreign citizens; military or civilian
- Awarded for: Distinguished and important services rendered to the cause of democracy and freedom.
- Status: Currently constituted
- Grand Master: President of the Portuguese Republic
- Chancellor: José Nunes Liberato
- Grades: Grand Collar; Grand Cross; Grand Officer; Commander; Officer; Member

Precedence
- Next (higher): Order of Prince Henry
- Next (lower): Order of Camões
- Ribbon bar of the Order of Liberty

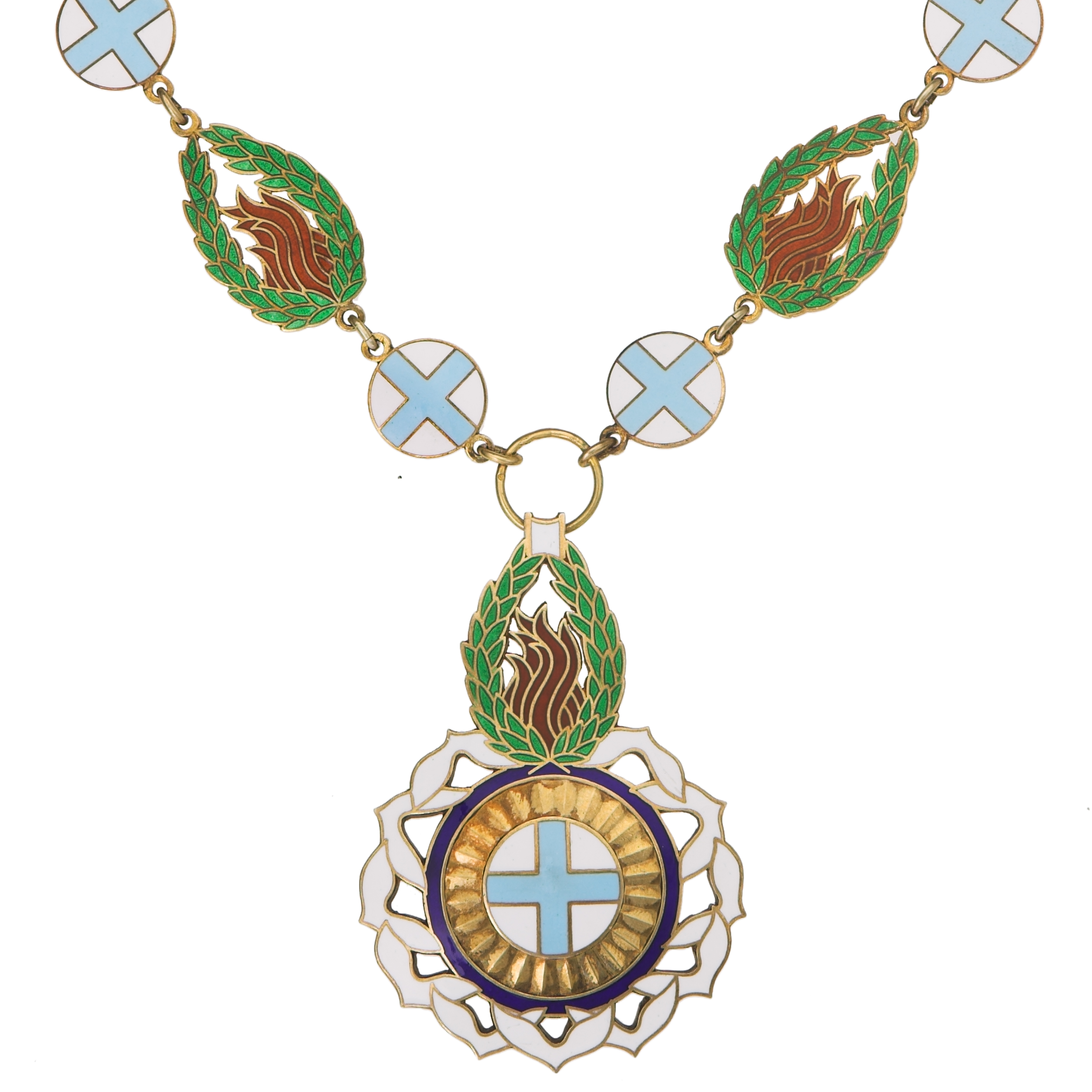
Chain of the Order of Liberty

The Order of Liberty, or the Order of Freedom (Portuguese: Ordem da Liberdade), is a Portuguese honorific civil order that distinguishes relevant services to the cause of democracy and freedom, in the defense of the values of civilization and human dignity. The order was created in 1976, after the Carnation Revolution of 1974 in which the corporatist authoritarian Estado Novo regime of António de Oliveira Salazar and Marcello Caetano was deposed. The Grand Collar can also be given by the President of Portugal to former Heads of State and others whose deeds are of an extraordinary nature and particular relevance to Portugal, making them worthy of such a distinction. This can include political acts, physical acts of defense for Portugal, or the good representation of Portugal in other countries.

== Grades ==
The order includes six classes; in decreasing order of seniority, these are:

- Grand Collar (Grande-Colar – GColL)
- Grand Cross (Grã-Cruz – GCL)
- Grand Officer (Grande-Oficial – GOL)
- Commander (Comendador – ComL)
- Officer (Oficial – OL)
- Knight/Dame (Cavaleiro – CvL / Dama – DmL)

Like the other Portuguese orders, the title of Honorary Member (Membro Honorário – MHL) can be awarded to institutions and locals.

== List of Grand Collars of the Order of Liberty ==
=== Portuguese recipients ===
- 9 March 1996: Mário Soares, former president of the Republic
- 9 March 2006: Jorge Sampaio, former president of the Republic
- 18 December 2015: António Ramalho Eanes, former president of the Republic
- 9 March 2016: Aníbal Cavaco Silva, former president of the Republic
- 9 March 2026: Marcelo Rebelo de Sousa, former president of the Republic

=== Foreign recipients ===
- 28 October 1987: François Mitterrand, former president of France
- 13 October 1988: King Juan Carlos I of Spain
- 13 December 1990: Václav Havel, former president of the Czech Republic
- 11 November 1991: António Mascarenhas Monteiro, former president of Cape Verde
- 26 August 1992: Patricio Aylwin, former president of Chile
- 12 October 1992: Miguel Trovoada, former president of São Tomé and Príncipe
- 11 May 1993: Lech Wałęsa, former president of Poland
- 13 September 1994: Zhelyu Zhelev, former president of Bulgaria
- 4 October 1995: Fernando Henrique Cardoso, former president of Brazil
- 11 October 1995: Sam Nujoma, former president of Namibia
- 23 July 2003: Luiz Inácio Lula da Silva, former president of Brazil
- 11 October 2005: Kofi Annan, former secretary-general of United Nations
- 30 June 2016: Joaquim Chissano, former president of Mozambique
- 19 July 2016: François Hollande, former president of France
- 30 March 2017: Michelle Bachelet, former president of Chile
- 10 April 2017: Jorge Carlos Fonseca, former president of Cape Verde
- 23 May 2017: Henri, Grand Duke of Luxembourg
- 13 November 2017: Juan Manuel Santos, former president of Colombia
- 6 December 2017: Sergio Mattarella, President of Italy
- 15 April 2018: King Felipe VI of Spain
- 10 December 2022: Amílcar Cabral (posthumously)
- 24 August 2023: Volodymyr Zelenskyy, President of Ukraine
- 7 October 2023: Klaus Iohannis, President of Romania
- 27 February 2025: Emmanuel Macron, President of France

== List of Grand Crosses of the Order of Liberty ==
=== Foreign recipients ===
- 16 July 1988: Maria Helena Vieira da Silva, abstract painter
- 30 June 1989: Andreas Papandreou, former prime minister of Greece
- 22 April 1991: Nelson Mandela, former president of South Africa
- 25 January 1993: Árpád Göncz, former president of Hungary
- 9 June 1993: Xanana Gusmão, former president of East Timor
- 28 December 1994: Álvaro Lins, former ambassador of Brazil
- 24 April 1995: Miguel Ángel Martínez Martínez, former Parliamentary Assembly President, Council of Europe
- 29 May 1995: José Francisco Peña Gómez, former mayor of Santo Domingo, Dominican Republic
- 17 June 1995: Mikhail Gorbachev, former president of Soviet Union
- 1 March 1996: Javier Pérez de Cuéllar, former secretary-general of United Nations
- 22 February 1996: Adolfo Suárez, former prime minister of Spain
- 9 June 1998: José Ramos-Horta, President of East Timor
- 11 March 2000: Pascoela Barreto, Ambassador of East Timor to Portugal
- 23 July 2003: Marisa Letícia Lula da Silva, former first lady of Brazil
- 22 March 2005: Lionel Jospin, former prime minister of France
- 5 January 2006: Albie Sachs, former judge of Constitutional Court, South Africa
- 13 May 2016: Ban Ki-moon, former secretary-general of United Nations
- 16 January 2017: Martin Schulz, former president of the European Parliament
- 19 July 2017: Shah Karim Aga Khan IV
- 15 April 2018: Queen Letizia of Spain
- 5 July 2018: Sir Peter Cosgrove, former governor-general of Australia
- 24 August 2023: Volodymyr Zelenskyy, President of Ukraine

== See also ==
- Honorific orders of Portugal
