= Sovereignty body (Portugal) =

The 1976 Constitution defines the structure of the Portuguese State as the Sovereignty Bodies, which are divided in four institutions: The President of the Republic, the Assembly of the Republic, the Government and the Courts.

== Bodies ==
The President of the Republic is elected by popular vote for a five-year term, open to reelection for a second term, and has a moderating power.

The Assembly of the Republic, and its current 230 members, are also elected by popular vote but for a four-year term, with no term limits for seating members, and represent the whole country, not just the constituencies from which they were elected. The Assembly of the Republic has full legislative powers and oversees the government.

The Government is formed after the nomination of the Prime Minister, by the President, as a result, under normal conditions, of the composition of the Assembly of the Republic following an election, having full executive powers and being accountable to the Assembly and also the President.

The Courts are the last sovereignty body, and these are represented by the judges from the Supreme Court of Justice, the Constitutional Court, the Supreme Administrative Court and the Court of Auditors.
