= Order of precedence in Portugal =

Relative preeminence of officials for ceremonial purposes

The present Portuguese order of precedence is defined by the Law of the Precedences of Protocol of the Portuguese State of 25th August 2006. This defines the following precedence:

1. The President of the Republic
2. The President of the Assembly of the Republic
3. The Prime Minister
4. The President of the Supreme Court and the President of the Constitutional Court
5. The President of the Supreme Administrative Court and the President of the Court of Auditors
6. Former Presidents of the Republic
7. Ministers of the Government of Portugal
8. The Leader of the Opposition
9. Vice-presidents of the Assembly of the Republic and Presidents of the parliamentary groups
10. The Attorney-general of the Republic
11. The Chief of the General Staff of the Armed Forces
12. The Ombudsman
13. Representatives of the Republic to the Autonomous Regions (Azores and Madeira)
14. Presidents of the Legislative Assemblies of the Autonomous Regions (Azores and Madeira)
15. Presidents of the Regional Governments (Azores and Madeira)
16. Leaders of other parties with seats in the Assembly of the Republic
17. Former Presidents of the Assembly of the Republic and former Prime Ministers
18. Councilors of State
19. Presidents of Permanent Commissions of the Assembly of the Republic
20. Secretaries and under-secretaries of State of the Government of Portugal
21. Chiefs of Staff of the Army, Navy, and Air Force
22. Members of the Assembly of the Republic
23. Members of the European Parliament
24. Marshals and Admirals of the fleet
25. Chiefs of the Civilian House and Military House of the President of the Republic (top presidential aides)
26. Presidents of the Economic and Social Council, of the National Association of Portuguese Municipalities and of the National Association of Freguesias
27. The Governor of the Bank of Portugal
28. Chancellors of Honorific Orders of Portugal
29. Vice-presidents of the Supreme Judges Council (Conselho Superior da Magistratura)
30. Judges of the Constitutional Court
31. Judges of the Supreme Court, Supreme Administrative Court, and Court of Audits
32. Regional secretaries and under-secretaries of the Governments of the Autonomous Regions (Azores and Madeira)
33. Members of the Legislative Assemblies of Autonomous Regions (Azores and Madeira)
34. The Commandant-general of the National Republican Guard and the National Director of the Public Security Police
35. Secretaries-general of the Presidency of the Republic, of the Assembly of the Republic, of the Presidency of the Council of Ministers and of the Ministry of Foreign Affairs
36. The Chief of Protocol
37. Presidents of intermediate level courts (Relação), Presidents of the Council of Rectors of Portuguese Universities and of the Coordinator Council of the Polytechnics, leaders of the Bar Associations and Presidents of professional associations of public law
38. Presidents of the Portuguese Academy of History and the Lisbon Academy of Sciences, Rectors of universities and Presidents of Polytechnics
39. Members of the councils of the Honorific Orders of Portugal
40. Judges of intermediate level courts and deputies attorneys-general, vice-rectors of universities and vice-presidents of polytechnics
41. Presidents of the municipal councils (Mayors)
42. Presidents of the municipal assemblies
43. Civil governors of districts
44. Chiefs of Staff of the President of the Republic, President of the Assembly of the Republic, and Prime Minister
45. Presidents, members and secretaries-general of councils, national councils, superior councils, oversight councils, national commissions, high authorities, high commissioners, oversight committees, by order of seniority of the respective institution, directors-general and presidents of public institutions, by order of their respective ministries, the head of the Santa Casa de Misericórdia, and the President of the Portuguese Red Cross
46. Admirals and general officers with command functions, by order of military rank, operational commanders and commanders of military zone, maritime zone, and air zone, of the Autonomous Regions of Azores and Madeira
47. Directors of the National Defense Institute and the Joint Command and Staff College, commanders of the Military Academy, Naval School, and Air Force Academy, admirals and general officers of 3 and 2 stars
48. Chiefs of staff of members of government
49. Deputies directors-general and regional directors
50. Judges and attorneys-general
51. Aldermans (vereadores) of municipal councils
52. Aides of the President of the Republic, of the President of the Assembly of the Republic, and of the Prime Minister
53. Presidents of Civil Parishes
54. Members of municipal assemblies
55. Presidents of parish assemblies and members of civil parishes and parish assemblies
56. Directors of service
57. Chiefs of division
58. Aides of members of government
