= Politics of Portugal =

Portugal is a unitary multi-party semi-presidential representative democratic republic, whereby the prime minister is the head of government, and the president is the non-executive head of state which, although it is a somewhat ceremonial figure, has some significant political powers they exercise often. Executive power is exercised by the government, whose leader is the prime minister. Legislative power is primarily vested in the Assembly of the Republic (the Portuguese parliament), although the government is also able to legislate on certain matters. The Judiciary of Portugal is independent of the executive and the legislature. The President exerts a sort of "moderating power", not easily classified into any of the traditional three branches of government.

Since 1975, the party system has been dominated by the center-left Socialist Party and the liberal-conservative Social Democratic Party, but in the 2025 snap elections, the nationalist far-right Chega managed to achieve 23% of the popular vote and got 60 seats in the Assembly of the Republic, leading the opposition.

The 2025 Economist Democracy Index classified Portugal as a "Full democracy", ranking number 20th worldwide, while the 2026 V-Dem Democracy Indices ranked Portugal as the 23rd most electoral democratic country in the world, but, for the first time, put the country on the V-Dem's Watchlist of countries very close to becoming autocratizers.

== Political background ==
The national and regional governments are dominated by two political parties, the centre-left Socialist Party (PS), a social-democratic party, and the centre-right, liberal-conservative Social Democratic Party (PSD), which have similar basic policies in some respects: both are pro-European, support NATO membership and the welfare state. Other parties with seats in parliament are Chega, the Portuguese Communist Party, the Left Bloc, LIVRE, the Liberal Initiative and People-Animals-Nature. The Communists and the Ecologist Party "The Greens" run in a coalition as the Unitary Democratic Coalition.

== History ==
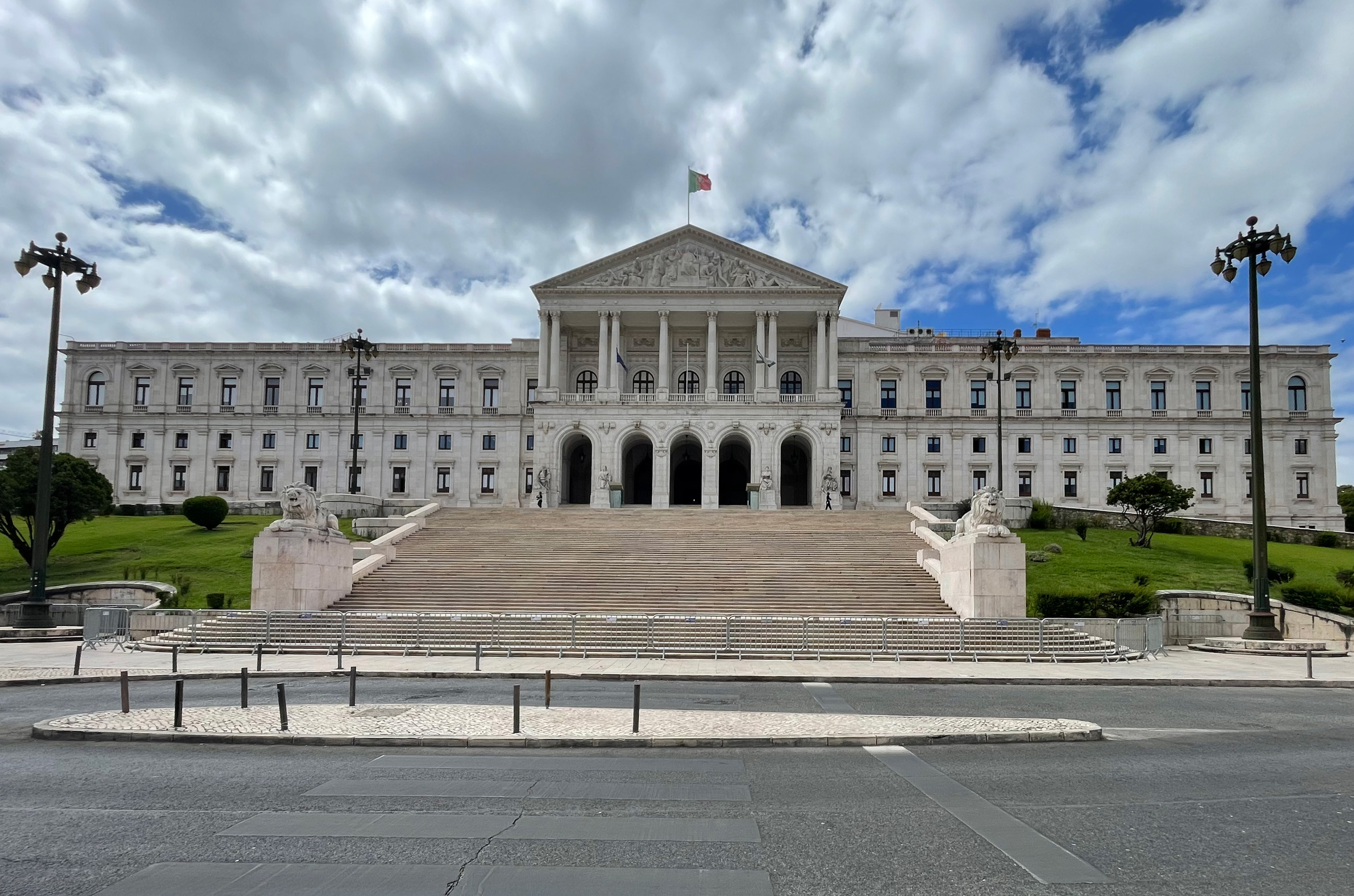
The São Bento Palace, home to the Portuguese Assembly of the Republic, in Lisbon.

The first constitution was created in 1822 (following the Liberal Revolution of 1820), followed by a second in 1826, followed by a third in 1838 (after the Liberal Wars), a fourth in 1911 (following the 5 October 1910 revolution), and a fifth 1933 (after the 28 May 1926 coup d'état).

Portugal's 25 April 1976 constitution reflected the country's 1974–76 move from authoritarian rule to provisional military government to a representative democracy with some initial Communist and left-wing influence. The military coup in 1974, which became known as the Carnation Revolution, was a result of multiple internal and external factors like the colonial wars that ended in removing the dictator, Marcelo Caetano, from power. The prospect of a communist takeover in Portugal generated considerable concern among the country's NATO allies. The revolution also led to the country abruptly abandoning its colonies overseas and to the return of an estimated 600,000 Portuguese citizens from abroad. The 1976 constitution, which defined Portugal as a "Republic... engaged in the formation of a classless society," was revised in 1982, 1989, 1992, 1997, 2001, and 2004.

The 1982 revision of the constitution placed the military under strict civilian control, trimmed the powers of the president, and abolished the Revolutionary Council (a military body with legislative veto and quasi-judicial powers). The country joined the European Union in 1986, beginning a path toward greater economic and political integration with its richer neighbors in Europe. The 1989 revision of the constitution eliminated much of the remaining Marxist rhetoric of the original document, abolished the communist-inspired "agrarian reform", and laid the groundwork for further privatization of nationalized firms and the government-owned communications media. The 1992 revision made it compatible with the Maastricht Treaty.

The current Portuguese constitution provides for progressive administrative decentralization and calls for future reorganization on a regional basis. The Azores and Madeira archipelagos have constitutionally mandated autonomous status. A regional autonomy statute promulgated in 1980 established the Government of the Autonomous Region of the Azores; the Government of the Autonomous Region of Madeira operates under a provisional autonomy statute in effect since 1976. Apart from the Azores and Madeira, the country is divided into 18 districts, each headed by a governor appointed by the Minister of Internal Administration. Macau, a former dependency, reverted to Chinese sovereignty in December 1999.

=== 1st and 2nd Constitutional Governments (1976–1978) ===
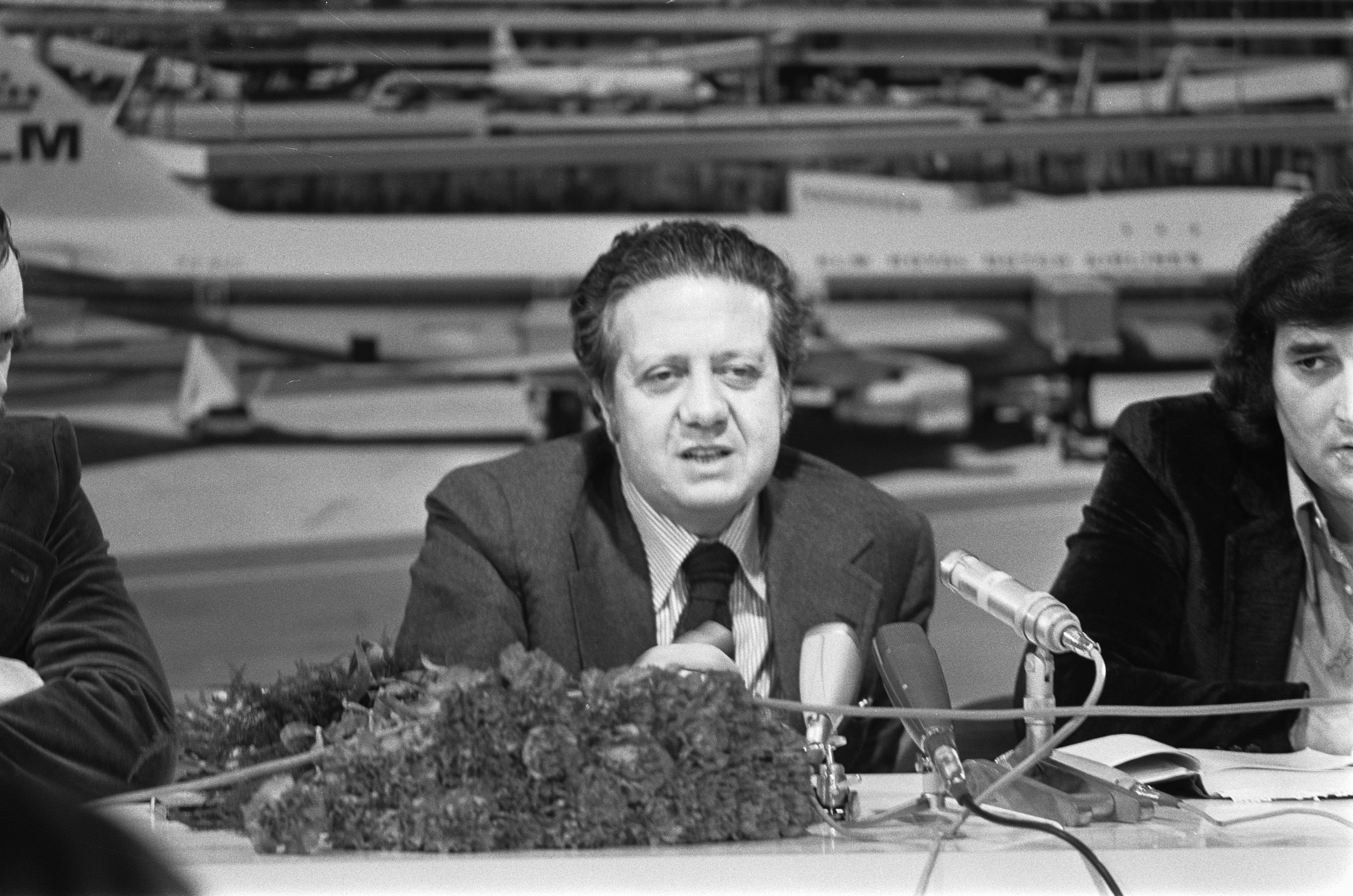
Mário Soares in 1975

The Socialist Party, under the leadership of Mário Soares, rose to power after the 1976 legislative elections and formed the I Constitutional Government. However, this government faced a lot of problems due to the country's economic situation, losing a vote of confidence in 1977, and in 1978, the II Constitutional Government, a coalition between the Socialists and the Democratic and Social Centre, was sworn in. The coalition only lasted eight months and Mário Soares resigned.

=== 3rd, 4th and 5th Constitutional Governments (1978–1980) ===
President Eanes then nominated the 3rd Constitutional Government, under the leadership of Alfredo Nobre da Costa, which was sworn in on late August 1978, but lasted just three months as it failed to gain Parliamentary support.

The 4th Constitutional Government, under the leadership of Carlos Mota Pinto, was sworn in on late November 1978, but, like the previous government, lasted very little, eight months, due to its failure to pass policies in Parliament.

The president then swore in the 5th Constitutional Government, under the leadership of Maria de Lourdes Pintasilgo, the first and still only female prime minister in Portuguese history. The government managed the country until the early elections of December 1979.

=== 6th, 7th, 8th Constitutional Governments (1980–1983) ===
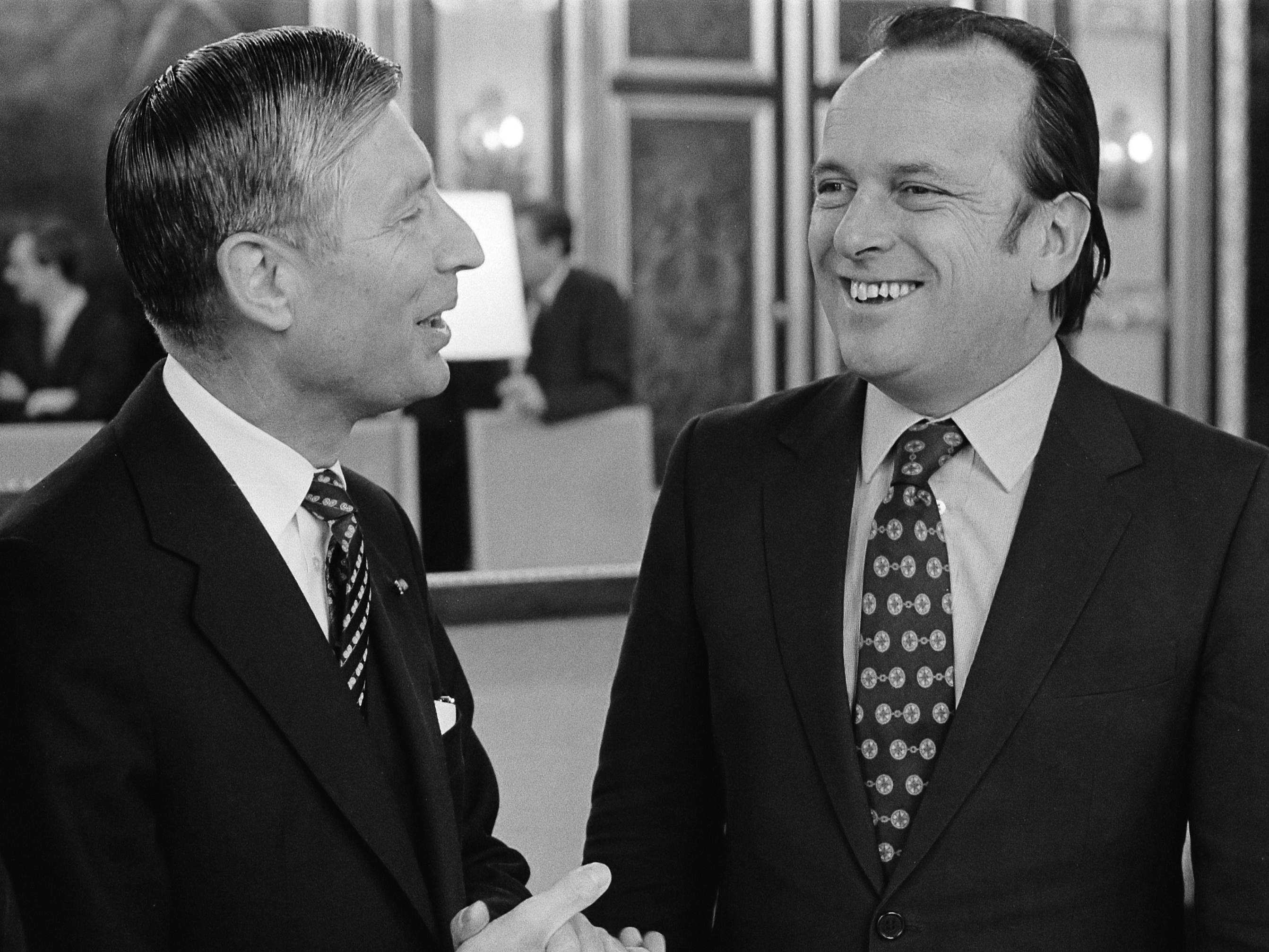
Francisco Pinto Balsemão with Dries van Agt in 1982

The Democratic Alliance, under the leadership of Francisco Sá Carneiro, won the 1979 legislative elections by a big margin and the 6th Constitutional Government was sworn in in January 1980. Sá Carneiro's tenure was short lived as he died in a plane crash in December 1980.

In January 1981, the Social Democratic Party, the main party within the Democratic Alliance, elected Francisco Pinto Balsemão as leader and the 7th Constitutional Government was sworn in. Internal issues within the Alliance forced a new government to take office, the VIII Constitutional Government, in September 1981, also led by Pinto Balsemão. Balsemão resigned in late 1982.

=== 9th Constitutional Government (1983–1985) ===
The Socialist Party, under the leadership of Mário Soares, returned to power after the 1983 legislative election and formed a Central Bloc government, the 9th Constitutional Government, between the two main parties, the Socialists and the Social Democrats. This government had to impose a severe economic bailout, through the IMF, to save the country's finances, but this led to a major social crisis with increased unemployment and poverty. Soares resigned in June 1985 after the Social Democrats withdrew from government following internal party problems.

=== 10th, 11th, 12th Constitutional Governments (1985–1995) ===
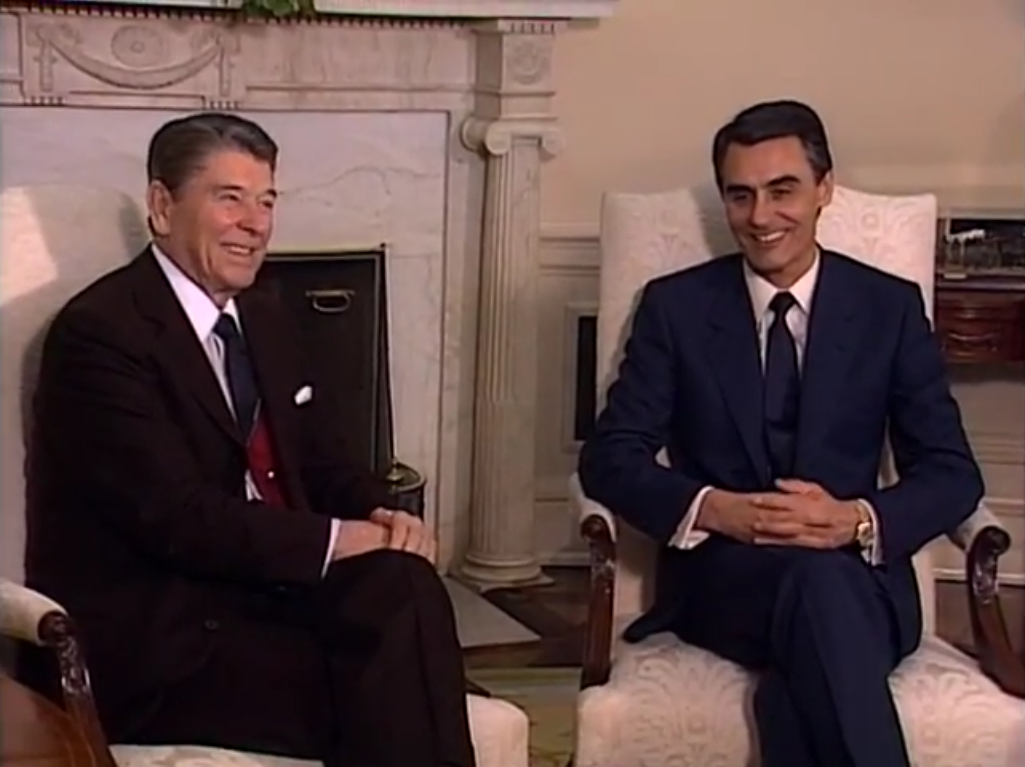
Aníbal Cavaco Silva with Ronald Reagan in 1988

The Social Democratic Party, under the leadership of Aníbal Cavaco Silva, rose to power after the 1985 legislative elections and formed a minority government. However, the government lost the confidence of Parliament in April 1987 after losing a non-confidence vote. After this, President Mário Soares called an early election for July 1987.

The 1987 early elections were held on 19 July and resulted in a landslide majority government for the Social Democrats, the first time a party won a majority on its own in democracy. The XI Constitutional Government, the first one to finish a full 4-year term in democracy, was sworn in on 17 August 1987. During this term, the PSD government initiated a big program of liberalization and privatization of several sectors of the economy.

In the 1991 election the Social Democrats were returned again to power and, also, with an absolute majority. It was the third consecutive election victory for the PSD, a record in democracy. The XII Constitutional Government was sworn in on 31 October 1991. After 1992, the economy fell into a recession and despite the recession being over by mid 1994, the government was badly hit and Cavaco Silva decided to not run for a fourth term as prime minister. Cavaco Silva's 10-year tenure as prime minister is the longest, so far, in democracy.

=== 13th and 14th Constitutional Governments (1995–2002) ===
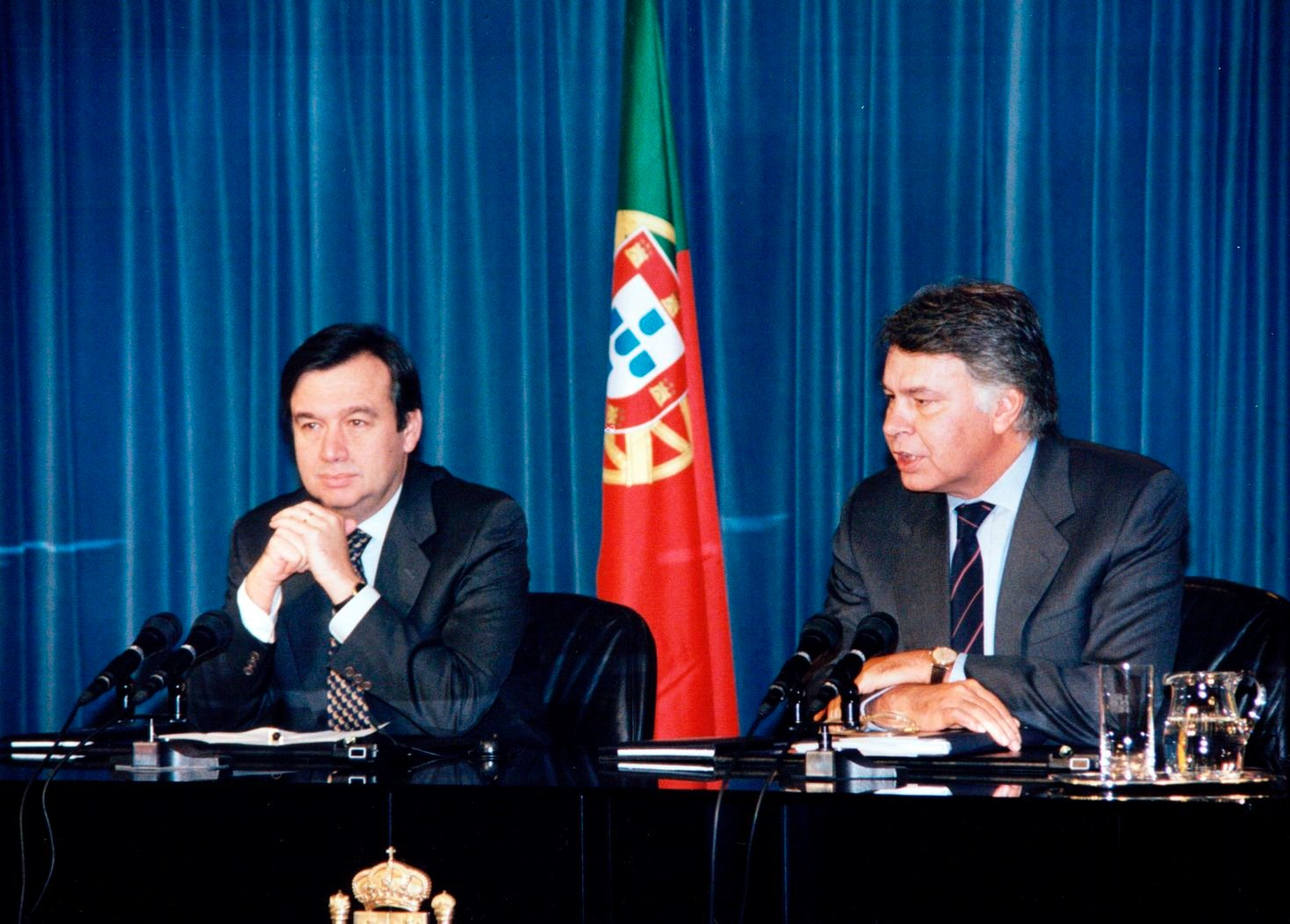
António Guterres with Felipe González in 1996

The Socialist Party, under the leadership of António Guterres, came to power following the October 1995 legislative elections. The Socialists later won a new mandate by winning exactly half the parliamentary seats in the October 1999 election, and constituting then the 14th Constitutional Government. Socialist Jorge Sampaio won the February 1996 presidential elections with nearly 54% of the vote. Sampaio's election marked the first time since the 1974 revolution that a single party held the prime ministership, the presidency, and a plurality of the municipalities. Local elections were held in December 1997.

Prime Minister Guterres continued the privatization and modernization policies initiated by his predecessor, Aníbal Cavaco Silva (in office 1985–1995) of the Social Democratic Party. Guterres was a vigorous proponent of the effort to include Portugal in the first round of countries to collaborate and put into effect the euro in 1999. In international relations, Guterres pursued strong ties with the United States and greater Portuguese integration with the European Union while continuing to raise Portugal's profile through an activist foreign policy. One of his first decisions as prime minister was to send 900 troops to participate in the IFOR peacekeeping mission in Bosnia. Portugal later contributed 320 troops to SFOR, the follow-up Bosnia operation. Portugal also contributed aircraft and personnel to NATO's Operation Allied Force in Kosovo. Guterres resigned in December 2001 after a disappointing result in the local elections.

=== 15th Constitutional Government (2002–2004) ===
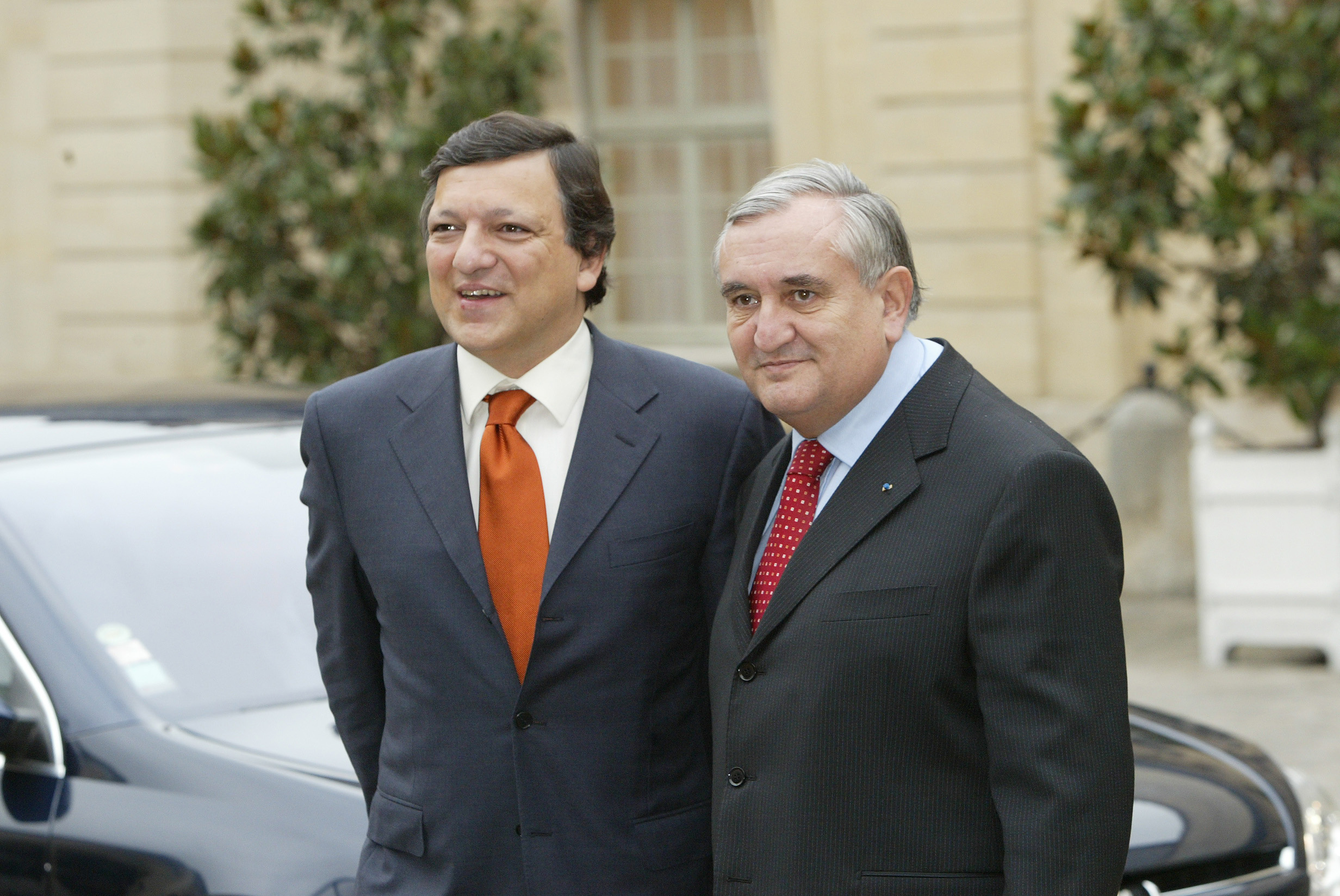
José Manuel Durão Barroso with Jean-Pierre Raffarin in 2003

Following the results of the 2002 early election, the 15th Constitutional Government, led by José Manuel Durão Barroso, leader of the Social Democratic Party, in coalition with the People's Party, whose leader, Paulo Portas, became minister of defence, was sworn in in April 2002. This government lasted just two years because, in June 2004, Durão Barroso announced his resignation to become president of the European Commission.

=== 16th Constitutional Government (2004–2005) ===
After José Manuel Durão Barroso accepted the invitation to be the next European Commission President, a new government had to be formed. Though opposition parties called for general elections, President Jorge Sampaio named Pedro Santana Lopes, the new Social Democratic Party leader, as prime minister, who thus formed a new government, in coalition with the People's Party. However, in December 2004, due to several controversies involving the government, the President dissolved the parliament and called for early elections. Santana Lopes resigned after the announcement of the President's decision.

=== 17th and 18th Constitutional Governments (2005–2011) ===
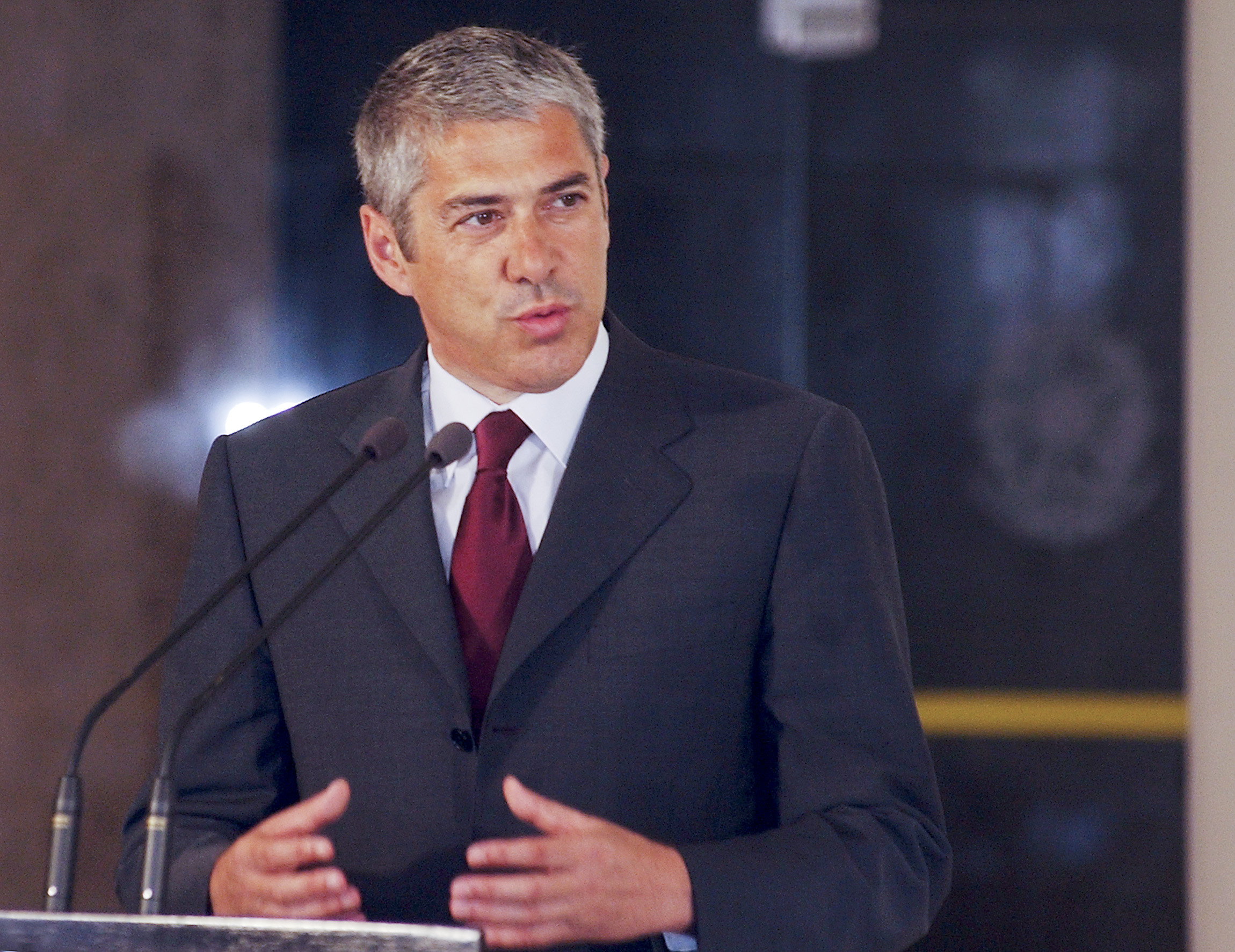
José Sócrates in 2006

In the elections on 20 February, the Socialist Party obtained its largest victory ever, achieving an absolute majority for the first time in the party's history. José Sócrates was sworn in by President Jorge Sampaio on 12 March. To many's surprise, Sócrates formed a cabinet made up of roughly half senior members of the Socialist Party and half independents, notably including Diogo Freitas do Amaral, founder of the right wing People's Party, who assumed office as Ministry of Foreign Affairs (he later resigned due to personal issues).

In the elections on 27 September 2009, The Socialist Party, led by incumbent Prime Minister José Sócrates, won the largest number of seats, but did not repeat the overall majority they gained in 2005. Sócrates was reconducted but lost his majority. The 2010 European debt crisis led Portugal to ask for a bailout from the IMF and the European Union. This situation led to the resignation of José Sócrates as prime minister and the President dissolved parliament and called an early election for June 2011.

=== 19th and 20th Constitutional Governments (2011–2015) ===
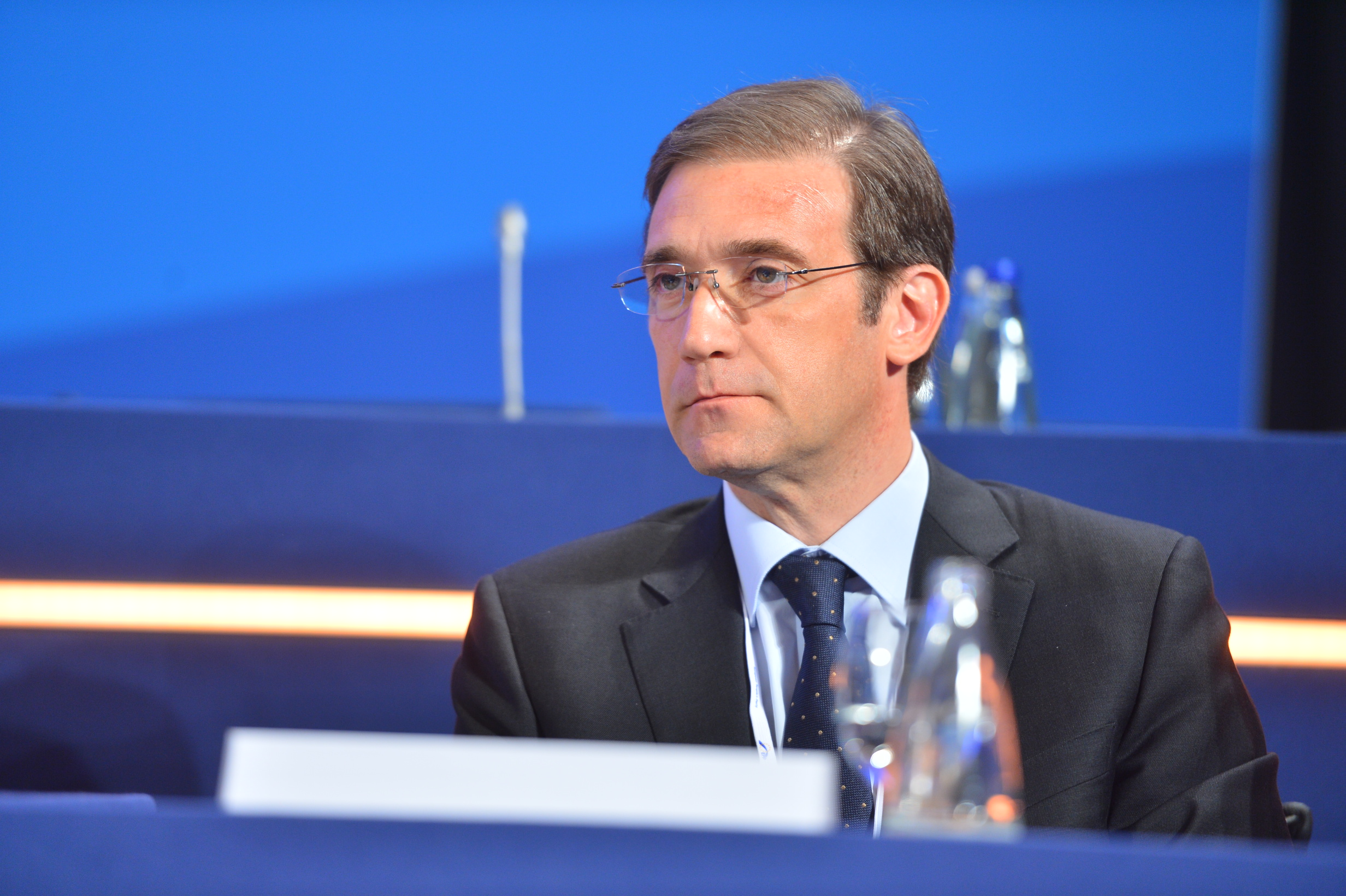
Pedro Passos Coelho in 2012

In the elections held on 5 June 2011, the Social Democratic Party (PSD) won enough seats to form a majority government with the People's Party (CDS–PP). The government was led by Pedro Passos Coelho. It had 11 ministers and was sworn in on 21 June.

In the 2015 elections, held on 4 October, which the PSD and CDS–PP contested as a coalition, Portugal Ahead, the government lost its absolute majority. The left-wing parties, the Socialist Party, Portuguese Communist Party, Ecologist Party "The Greens", and Left Bloc, argued that as they were willing to form an alliance which would have a majority in the assembly, they ought to be invited to form the government, while Portugal Ahead, as the largest grouping, argued that they should be invited to form the government. After three weeks of uncertainty, the President designated Passos Coelho as prime minister, which was followed by the formation of a minority government. However, the plan was rejected by the Parliament. It was the shortest-lived Portuguese national government since the Carnation Revolution. After that, the left-wing parties supported a minority government led by the Socialist Party (PS).

=== 21st, 22nd, 23rd Constitutional Governments (2015–2024) ===
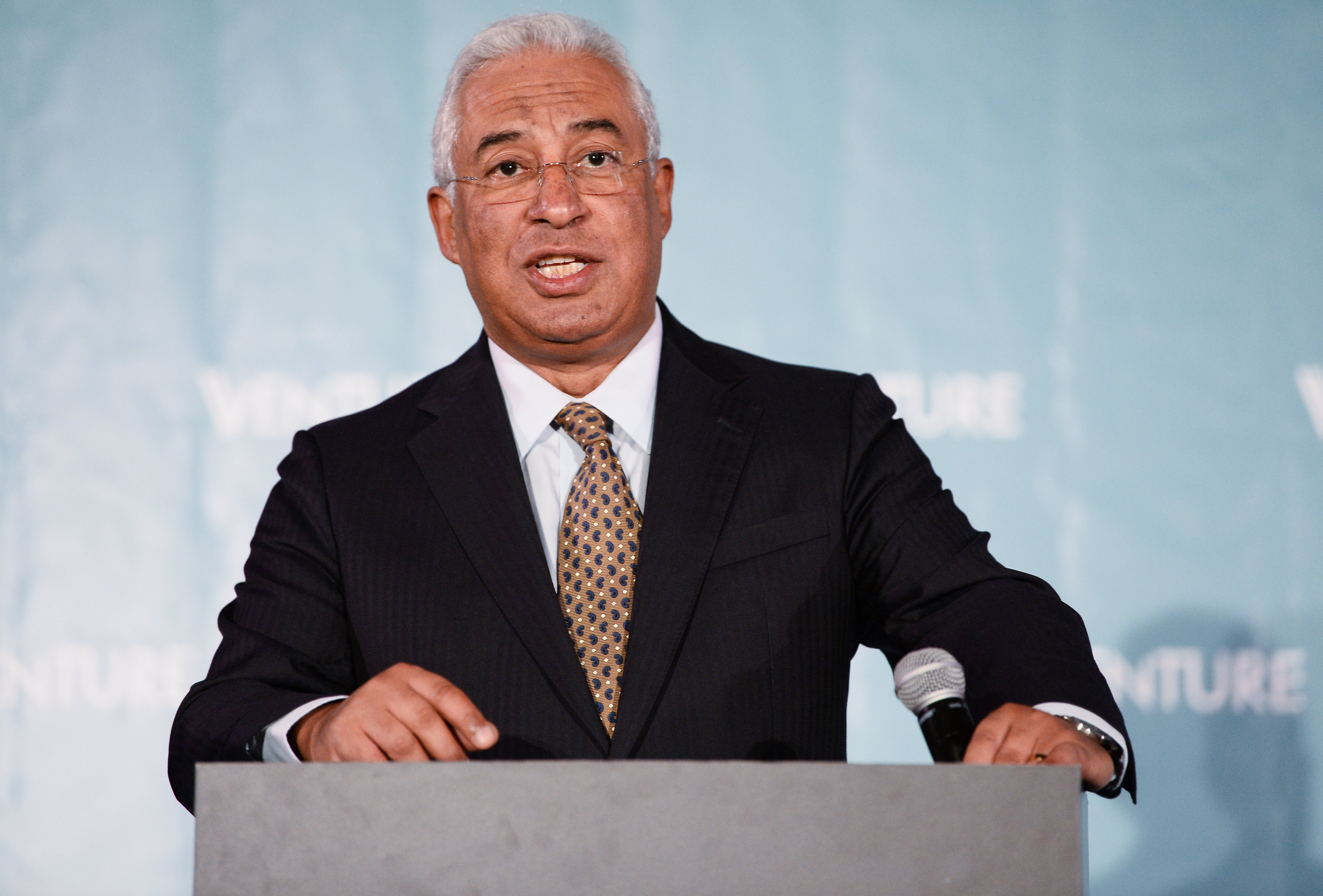
António Costa in 2017

The 21st cabinet of the Portuguese government since the establishment of the current constitution. It was established on 26 November 2015 as a Socialist Party (PS) minority government led by António Costa.

The election of 2019 was held on 6 October 2019. The centre-left PS of incumbent prime minister Costa obtained the largest share of the vote, and the most seats. The 22nd Constitutional Government was sworn in on 26 October 2019 as a PS minority government led by António Costa. In October 2021, the budget proposed by the government was rejected by parliament, leading president Marcelo Rebelo de Sousa to call an early election for January 2022.

The 2022 early elections were held on 30 January 2022. The election resulted in an absolute majority for the PS, the second in its history. However, the government swearing in was postponed because of a rerun in the overseas constituency of Europe, and the 23rd Constitutitional Government, led by António Costa, was only sworn in on 30 March 2022. António Costa resigned on 7 November 2023, following the Operation Influencer police searches into government contracts surrounding lithium and hydrogen businesses. The president dissolved parliament and called early elections.

=== 24th and 25th Constitutional Governments (2024–) ===
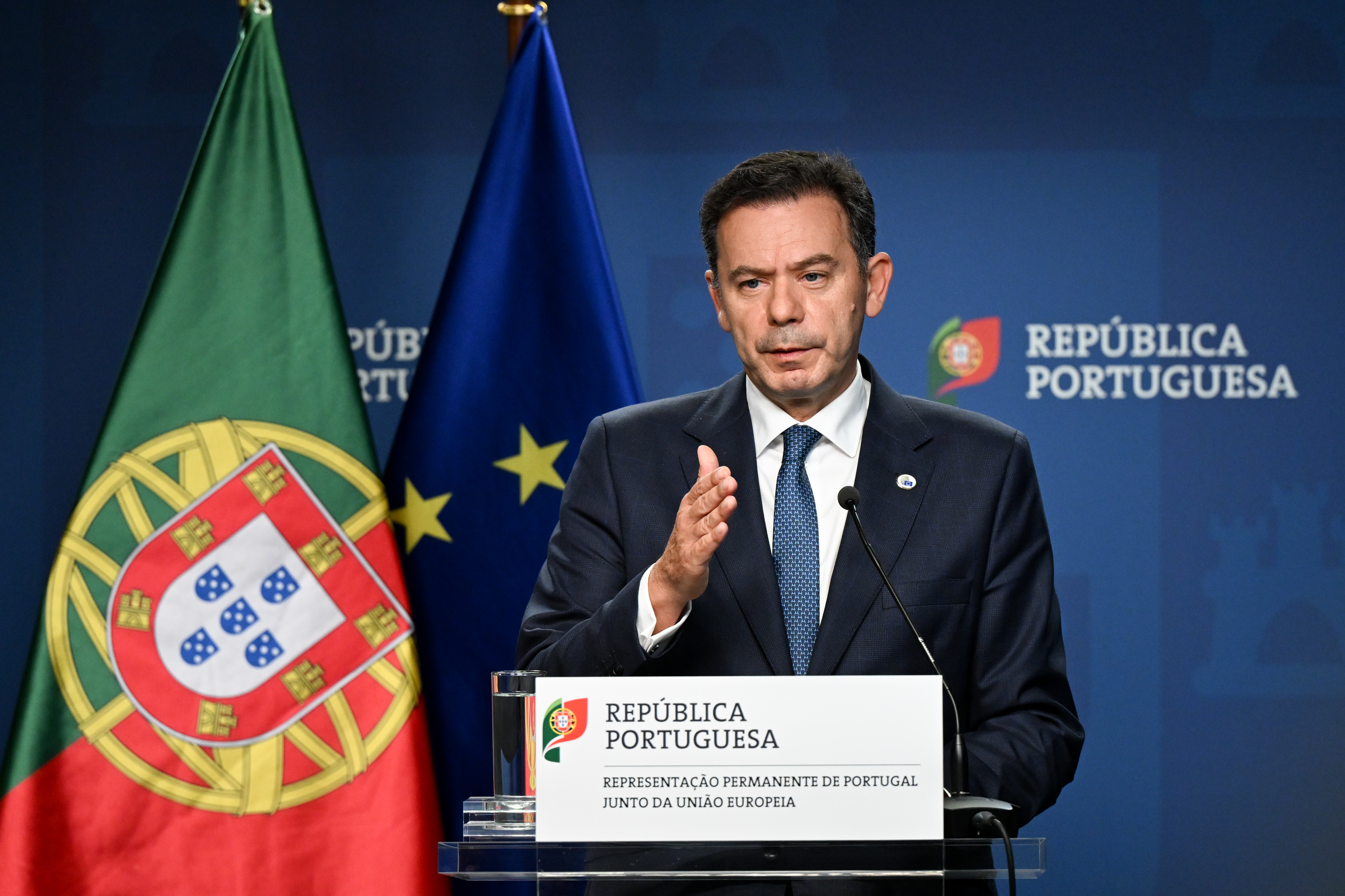
Luís Montenegro in 2025

In the early elections held on 10 March 2024, the Democratic Alliance (AD), an alliance between the Social Democratic Party (PSD), People's Party (CDS–PP) and the People's Monarchist Party (PPM), won enough seats to form a minority government. The 24th Constitutional Government led by Luís Montenegro had 17 ministers and was sworn in on 2 April 2024.

The government fell after losing a vote of confidence in March 2025, and the President dissolved Parliament and called an early election for 18 May 2025. The AD coalition won again, with a stronger mandate albeit still a minority, with the 25th Constitutional Government taking the oath of office on 5 June 2025.

== Political powers ==
Sovereignty bodies Órgãos de soberania
- Semi-presidential republic
- Formation: 25 April 1976
- Founding document: 1976 Constitution
- Country: Portugal

President of the Republic
- Holder: António José Seguro
- Seat: Belém Palace

Legislative branch
- Legislature: Assembly of the Republic
- Speaker: José Pedro Aguiar-Branco
- Deputy Speaker: Teresa Morais, Marcos Perestrello, Diogo Pacheco de Amorim, Rodrigo Saraiva
- Assembly members: 230
- Meeting place: São Bento Palace

Executive branch
- Prime Minister: Luís Montenegro
- Main body: Government
- Vice Prime Minister: Currently none
- Appointed by: President of the Republic
- Headquarters: São Bento Mansion
- Main organ: Council of Ministers
- Departments: Ministries and State Secretariats

Judicial branch
- Court: Constitutional Court
- President: João Carlos Loureiro
- Seat: Ratton Palace
- Other courts and presidents: Supreme Court of Justice (João Cura Mariano), Supreme Administrative Court (Jorge Miguel Barroso de Aragão Seia), Court of Auditors (Filipa Urbano Calvão)

Government in Portugal is made up of three branches originally envisioned by enlightenment philosopher Baron de Montesquieu: executive, legislative, and judicial. Each branch is separate and is designed to keep checks and balances on the others. The President's powers, however, do not fall into either of the traditional three, forming instead a sort of "moderating power" over the government and the legislature.

The four main organs of the national government are the President, the Government (which includes the prime minister and the Council of Ministers), the Assembly of the Republic (Parliament), and the judiciary, made up of different hierarchies of courts (the Supreme Court of Justice and its lower courts, the Supreme Administrative Court and its lower courts, the Constitutional Court and the Court of Auditors).

Main office-holders
Office	Name	Party	Since
President	António José Seguro	Socialist Party	9 March 2026
Prime Minister	Luís Montenegro	Social Democratic Party	2 April 2024

=== President ===
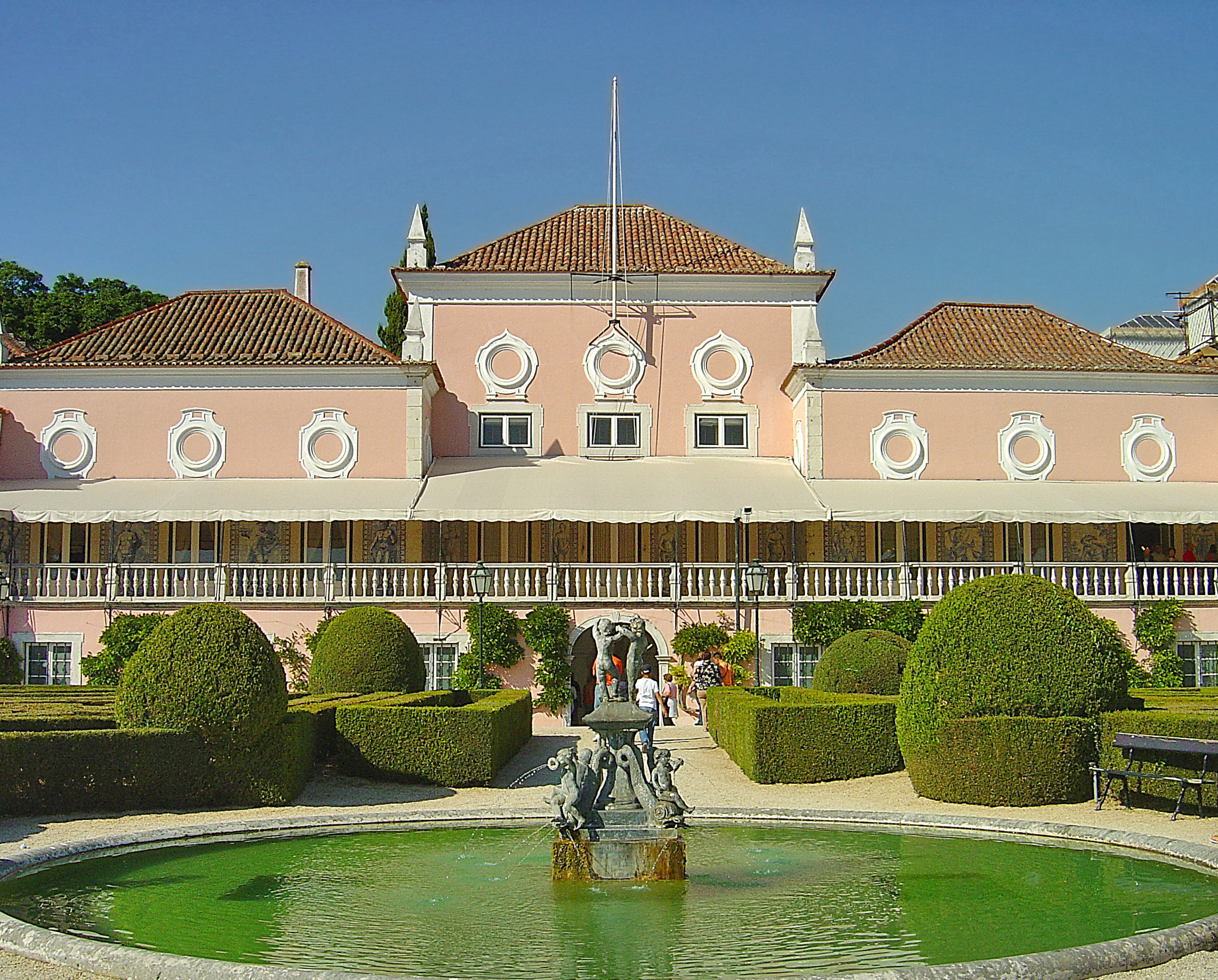
Belém Palace, the official residence of the President.

The President, elected to a 5-year term by direct universal suffrage, guarantees national independence and unity, the regular functioning of democratic institutions, and is also the commander-in-chief of the armed forces. Presidential powers include appointing the prime minister, always guided by the assembly election results, as well as the council of ministers and secretaries of state, both chosen by the prime minister; dismissing the prime minister; dissolving the assembly to call early elections; vetoing legislation, which may be overridden by the assembly; and declaring a state of war or siege, only with the approval of the assembly and on government advice.

The Council of State, a presidential advisory body, is composed of:

- The President of the Assembly of the Republic
- The Prime Minister of Portugal
- The President of the Constitutional Court of Portugal
- The Ombudsman of Portugal
- Both Presidents of the regional governments of the autonomous regions (Madeira and Azores)
- Former Presidents of the Republic
- Five citizens appointed by the President of the Republic
- Five citizens appointed by the Assembly of the Republic

==== Presidential elections ====
Candidate	Party	First round		Second round	
Candidate	Party	Votes	%	Votes	%
António José Seguro	Socialist Party (Note: Also supported by Volt Portugal.)	1,755,563	31.11	3,502,613	66.84
André Ventura	Chega	1,327,021	23.52	1,737,950	33.16
João Cotrim de Figueiredo	Liberal Initiative	903,057	16.00		
Henrique Gouveia e Melo	Independent (Note: Supported by the People's Monarchist Party.)	695,377	12.32		
Luís Marques Mendes	Social Democratic Party (Note: Also supported by CDS – People's Party.)	637,442	11.30		
Catarina Martins	Left Bloc	116,407	2.06		
António Filipe	Portuguese Communist Party (Note: Also supported by the Ecologist Party "The Greens".)	92,644	1.64		
Manuel João Vieira	Independent	60,927	1.08		
Jorge Pinto	LIVRE	38,588	0.68		
André Pestana	Independent (Note: Supported by the Socialist Alternative Movement.)	10,897	0.19		
Humberto Correia	Independent	4,773	0.08		
Total		5,642,696	100.00	5,240,563	100.00
Valid votes		5,642,696	97.82	5,240,563	95.01
Invalid votes		64,565	1.12	98,342	1.78
Blank votes		61,275	1.06	177,072	3.21
Total votes		5,768,536	100.00	5,515,977	100.00
Registered voters/turnout		11,009,803	52.39	11,025,823	50.03
Source: Comissão Nacional de Eleições

=== Legislative branch ===
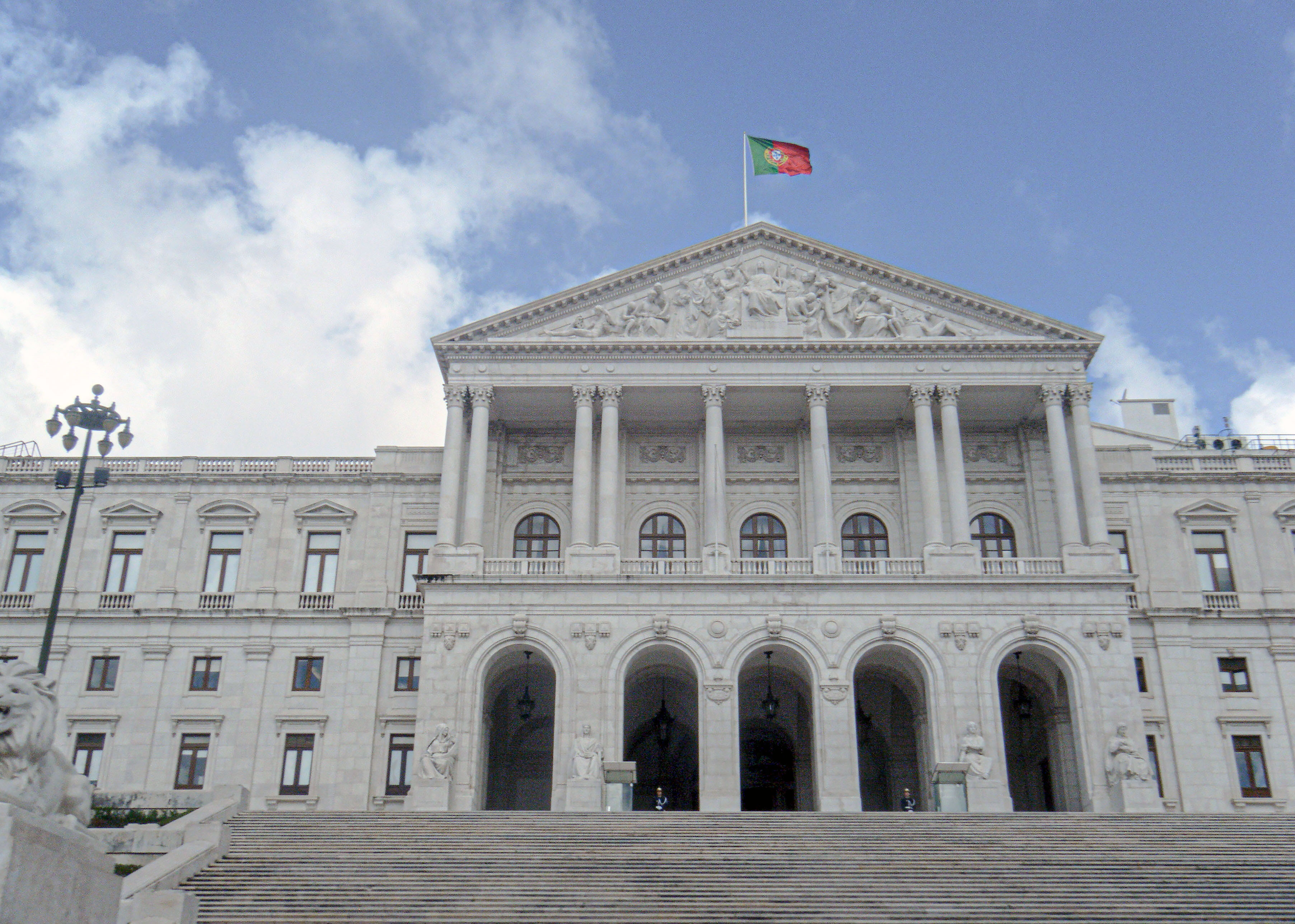
São Bento Palace, the meeting place of Parliament.

Legislative power is exercised by the Assembly of the Republic, which is the parliament of Portugal, although the Government also has a more limited ability to legislate on some matters (on others, Parliament has exclusive legislative competence). It is also the body which holds the Government accountable and has the means to remove it from office at any time, as described earlier, primarily through a motion of no confidence, although alternative methods exist.

The Assembly of the Republic is a unicameral body composed of 230 deputies (that is, members of parliament). Elected by universal suffrage according to a system of proportional representation, deputies serve terms of office of 4 years, unless the president dissolves the assembly and calls for new elections. According to the constitution, members of the assembly represent the entire country, not the constituency from which they are elected.

==== Political parties in legislative elections ====
Party or alliance		Votes	%	+/–	Seats	+/–
AD – PSD/CDS Coalition	AD – PSD/CDS Coalition (Note: Compared with the 2024 Democratic Alliance (PSD/CDS/PPM))	1,971,602	31.20	+3.02	88	+10
AD – PSD/CDS Coalition	Coalition PSD/CDS/PPM (Note: Only in Azores.)	36,886	0.58	–0.07	3	+1
AD – PSD/CDS Coalition	Total	2,008,488	31.78	+2.95	91	+11
Socialist Party		1,442,546	22.83	–5.15	58	–20
Chega		1,438,554	22.76	+4.73	60	+10
Liberal Initiative		338,974	5.36	+0.42	9	+1
LIVRE		257,291	4.07	+0.91	6	+2
Unitary Democratic Coalition		183,686	2.91	–0.26	3	–1
Left Bloc		125,808	1.99	–2.37	1	–4
People Animals Nature		86,930	1.38	–0.57	1	0
National Democratic Alternative		81,660	1.29	–0.29	0	0
Together for the People		20,900	0.33	+0.03	1	+1
React, Include, Recycle		14,021	0.22	–0.18	0	0
Volt Portugal		12,150	0.19	+0.01	0	0
Portuguese Workers' Communist Party		11,896	0.19	–0.05	0	0
Nova Direita		10,216	0.16	–0.09	0	0
Ergue-te		9,046	0.14	+0.05	0	0
Liberal Social Party		7,332	0.12	New	0	New
People's Monarchist Party		5,616	0.09	+0.08	0	0
We, the Citizens!		3,304	0.05	+0.01	0	0
Earth Party (Note: Compared with the 2024 Alternative 21 coalition (MPT/Alliance).)		478	0.01	–0.06	0	0
Portuguese Labour Party		425	0.01	–0.03	0	0
Total		6,059,321	100.00	–	230	0
Valid votes		6,059,321	95.88	+0.24		
Invalid votes		172,994	2.74	–0.23		
Blank votes		87,654	1.39	–0.00		
Total votes		6,319,969	100.00	–		
Registered voters/turnout		10,848,816	58.25	–1.65		
Source: Comissão Nacional de Eleições

=== Executive branch ===
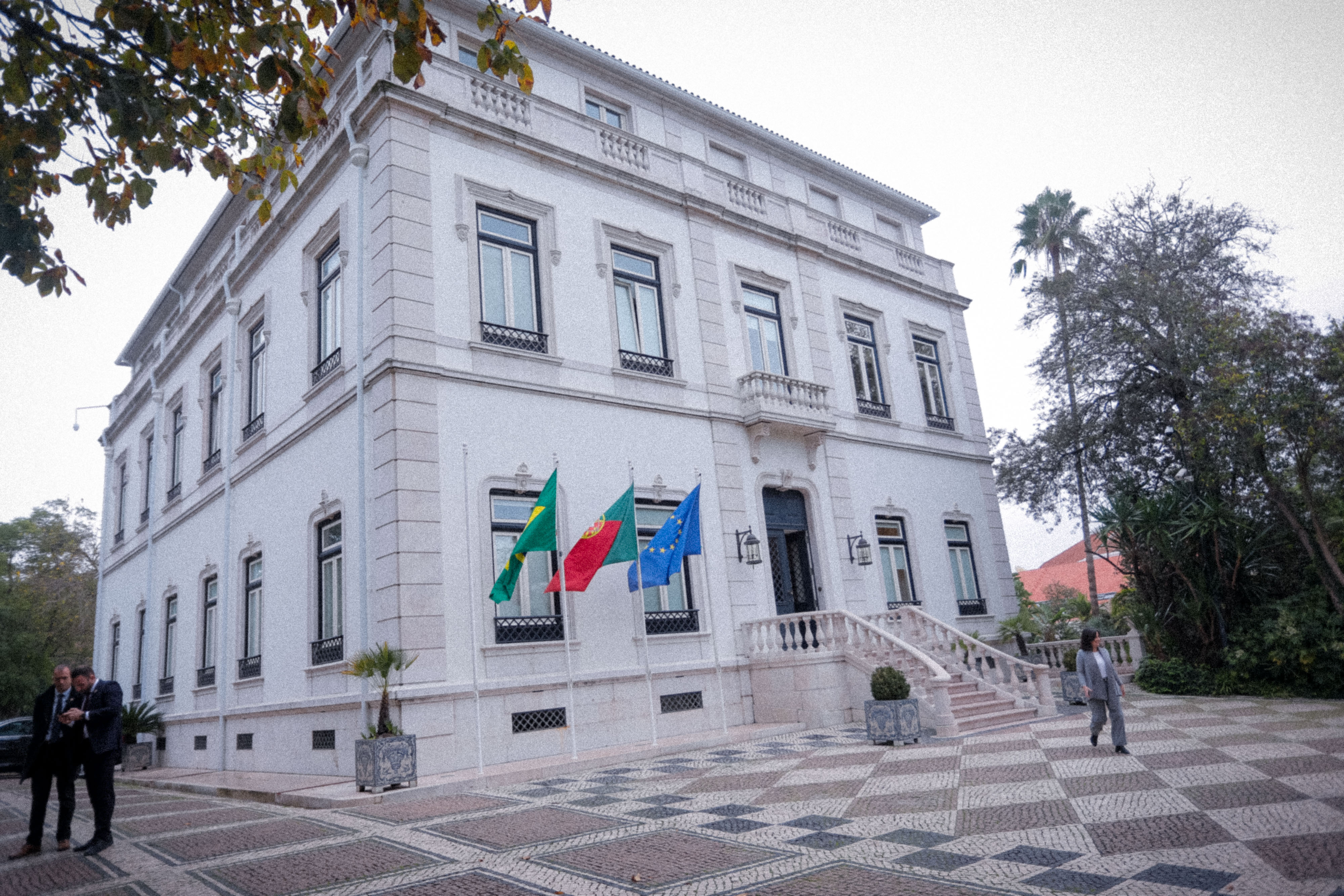
São Bento Mansion, the official residence and office of the Prime Minister.

Executive power is exercised by the Government of Portugal. The Government is formed after the President appoints the prime minister based on election results, as described earlier – traditionally, the leader of the most voted party. As head of the government, the prime minister is the sole executive leader, being the country's leading political figure and is responsible for the composition of the government, as well as for coordinating policies with all cabinet ministers, from domestic to foreign affairs.

The Government can only remain in place for as long as the Parliament allows: the Parliament can remove the Government at the beginning by approving a motion of rejection to the introductory Government programme, or at any time by approving a motion of no confidence, either of which is achieved by a simple majority; the Government may also, of its own initiative, choose to present at any time a motion of confidence, which acts as the opposite of a motion of no confidence: if rejected, the Government is removed. Finally, the Government also relies on Parliament to approve the state budget, which could indirectly force the Government's downfall by rejecting its budget proposal, although this is not inevitable. Thus, the Government, although not directly elected, is held accountable before Parliament, which is proportionally representative of the people. Typically, once the Government is removed from office, the President can call a snap election (also known as an early election).

Current government composition:

Office	Minister	Party	Start of term	End of term
Prime Minister	Luís Montenegro	PSD	5 June 2025	Incumbent
Minister of State and of Foreign Affairs	Paulo Rangel	PSD	5 June 2025	Incumbent
Minister of State and of Finance	Joaquim Miranda Sarmento	PSD	5 June 2025	Incumbent
Minister of the Presidency	António Leitão Amaro	PSD	5 June 2025	Incumbent
Minister of Economy and for Territorial Cohesion	Manuel Castro Almeida	PSD	5 June 2025	Incumbent
Minister Adjunct and for State Reform	Gonçalo Saraiva Matias	PSD	5 June 2025	Incumbent
Minister of Parliamentary Affairs	Carlos Abreu Amorim	PSD	5 June 2025	Incumbent
Minister of National Defence	Nuno Melo	CDS–PP	5 June 2025	Incumbent
Minister of Infrastructure and Housing	Miguel Pinto Luz	PSD	5 June 2025	Incumbent
Minister of Justice	Rita Júdice	Independent	5 June 2025	Incumbent
Minister of Internal Administration	Maria Lúcia Amaral	Independent	5 June 2025	10 February 2026
Minister of Internal Administration	Prime Minister Luís Montenegro served as interim minister between 10 and 23 February 2026.			
Minister of Internal Administration	Luís Neves	Independent	23 February 2026	Incumbent
Minister of Education, Science and Innovation	Fernando Alexandre	Independent	5 June 2025	Incumbent
Minister of Health	Ana Paula Martins	PSD	5 June 2025	Incumbent
Minister of Labour, Solidarity and Social Security	Maria do Rosário Palma Ramalho	Independent	5 June 2025	Incumbent
Minister of the Environment and Energy	Maria da Graça Carvalho	PSD	5 June 2025	Incumbent
Minister of Culture, Youth and Sports	Margarida Balseiro Lopes	PSD	5 June 2025	Incumbent
Minister of Agriculture and Sea	José Manuel Fernandes	PSD	5 June 2025	Incumbent

=== Judicial branch ===
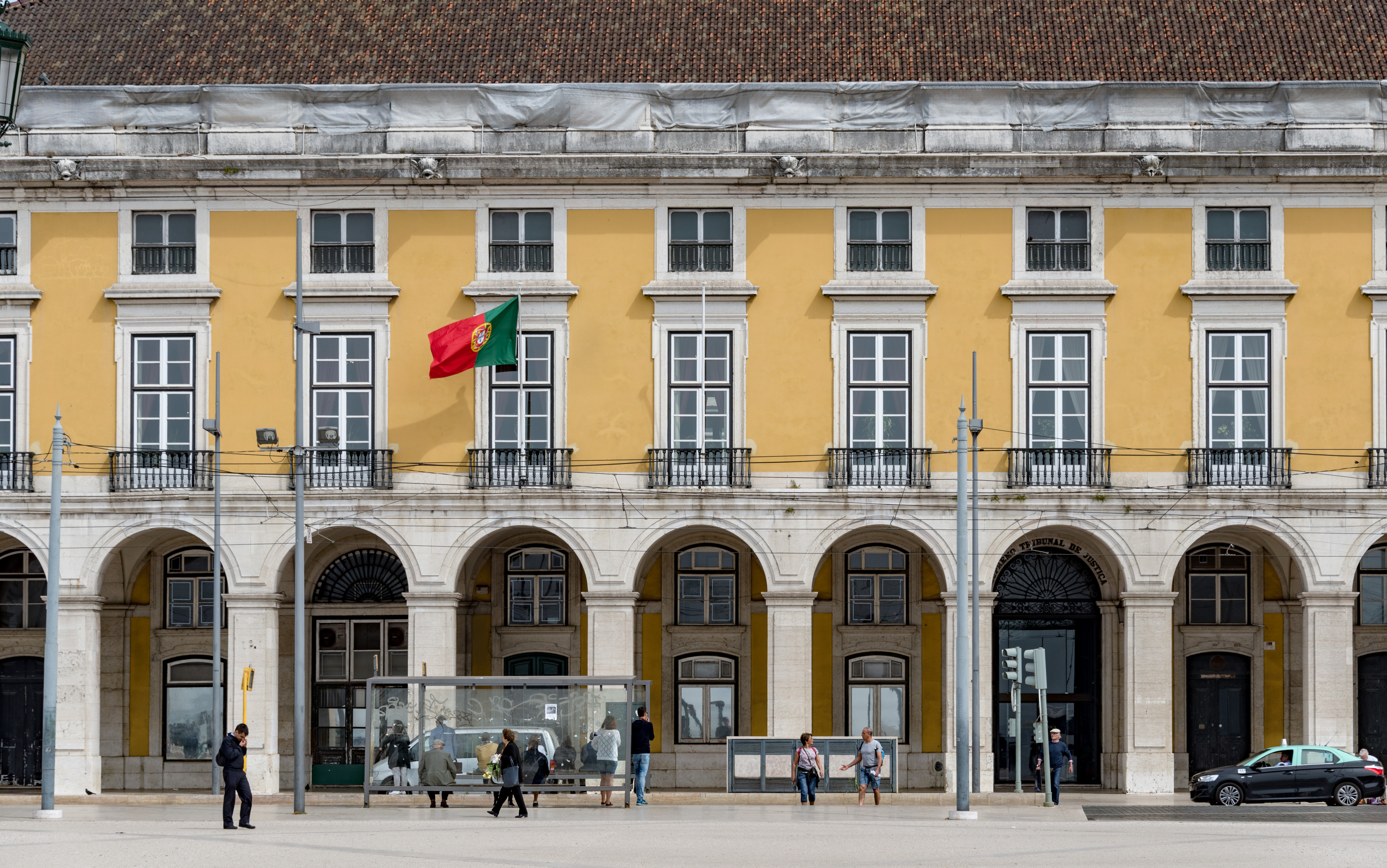
Supreme Court of Justice's seat.

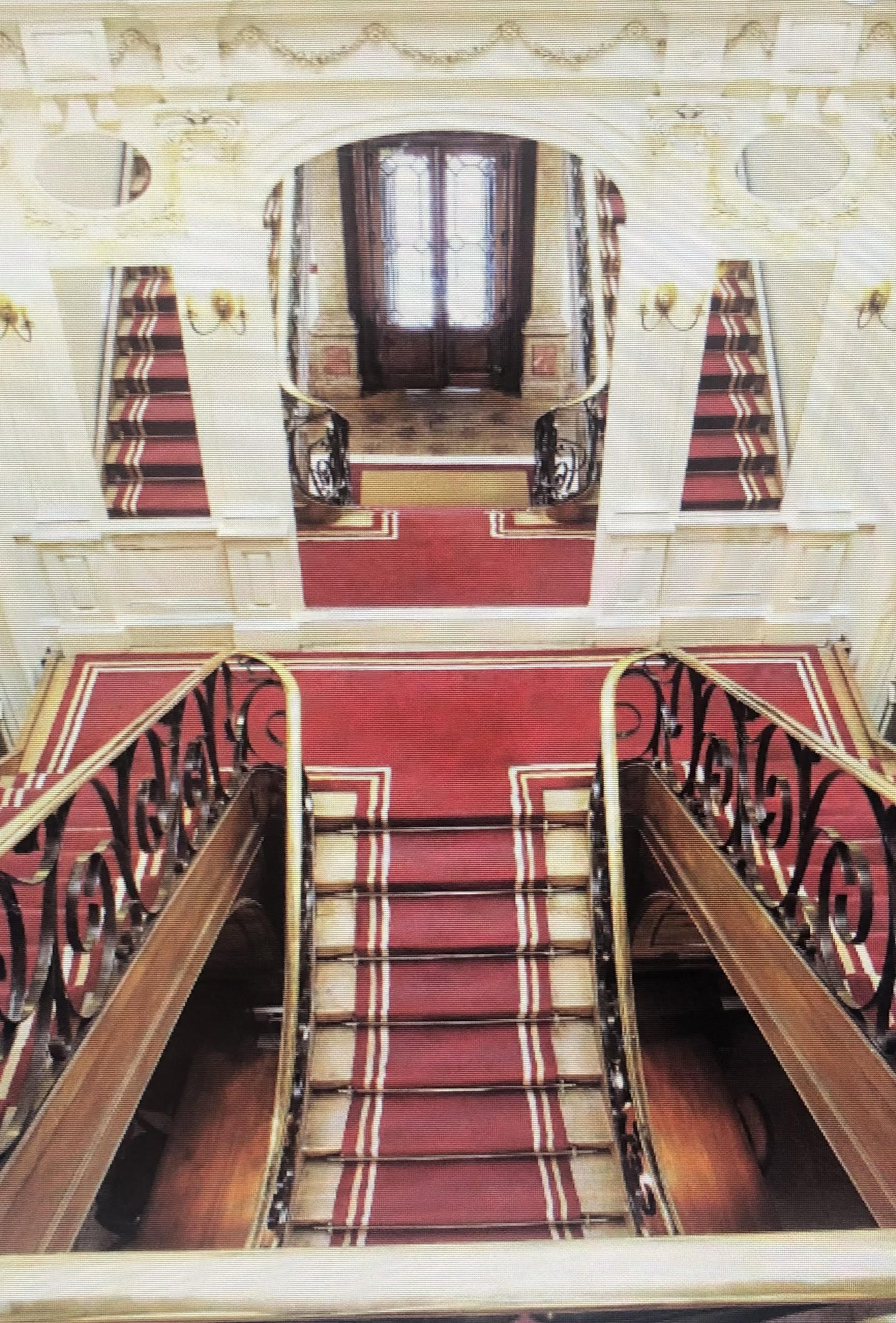
Administrative Supreme Court's seat.

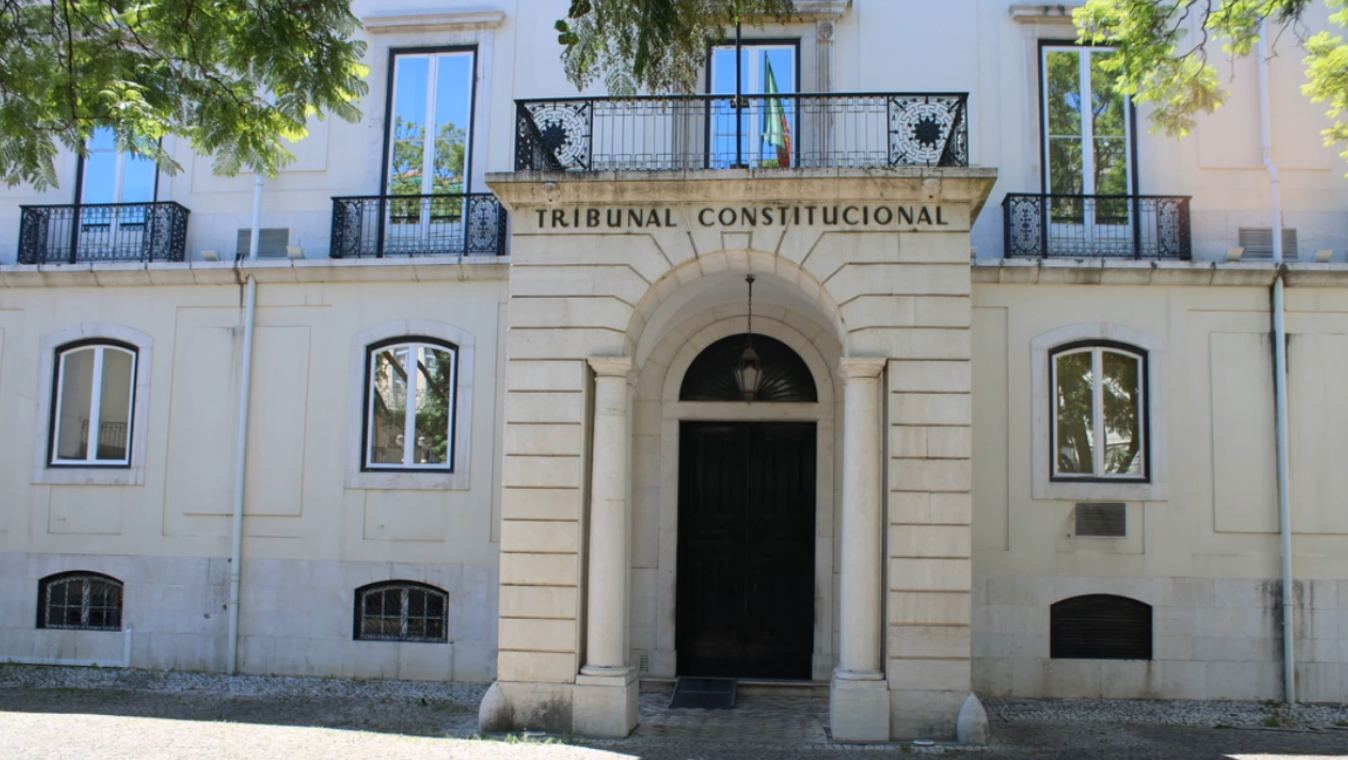
Ratton Palace, the Constitutional Court's seat.

The national Supreme Court is the court of last appeal in civil and criminal matters, which is described by the Constitution as "the senior organ in the hierarchy of the courts of law". There is a separate system of courts for administrative and fiscal matters, for which the court of last appeal is the Supreme Administrative Court. During war time, the law provides for there being military courts.

A thirteen-member Constitutional Court reviews the constitutionality of legislation. There is also a Court of Auditors, which is the highest institution for the oversight and control of public funds and assets.

== Administrative divisions ==
There are two autonomous regions (regiões autónomas, singular região autónoma) with limited legislative powers besides the administrative ones: Azores and Madeira. As purely administrative divisions, there are 18 districts (distritos), 308 municipalities (municípios) and 3259 civil parishes (freguesias). The districts are Aveiro, Açores (Azores)*, Beja, Braga, Bragança, Castelo Branco, Coimbra, Évora, Faro, Guarda, Leiria, Lisboa, Madeira*, Portalegre, Porto, Santarém, Setúbal, Viana do Castelo, Vila Real and Viseu.

== See also ==
- Assembly of the Republic
- Censorship in Portugal
- Foreign relations of Portugal
- Member of the European Parliament
- Sinistrisme
- Politics of France (similar system of Government)
- Politics of Romania (similar system of Government)
