= Supreme Court of Justice (Portugal) =

Highest court in Portugal

- Supremo Tribunal de Justiça
- Supreme Court of Justice logo

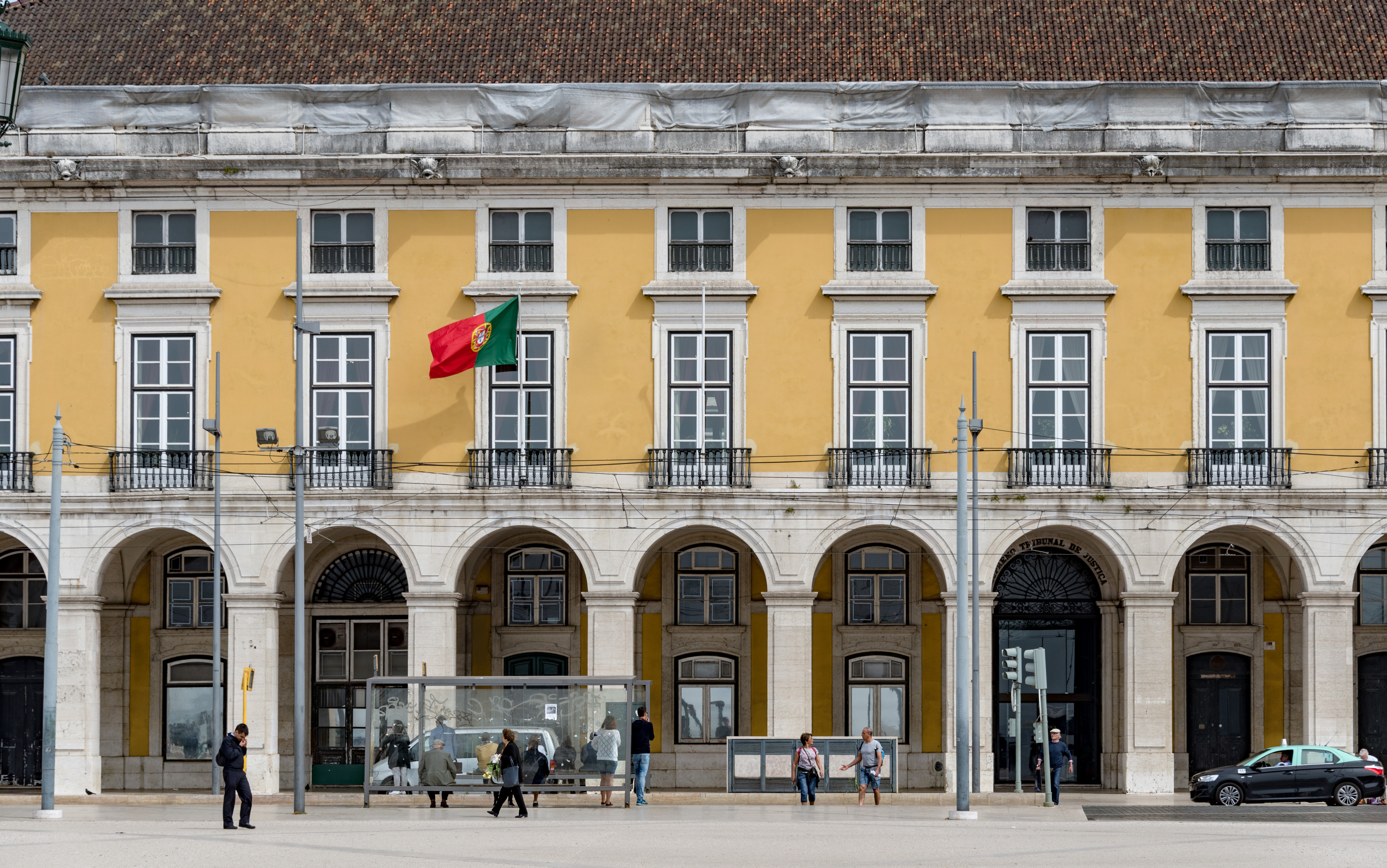
- Praça do Comércio, Lisbon, seat of the Supreme Court of Justice
- Interactive map of Supreme Court of Justice
- 38°42′30.762″N 9°8′11.0508″W
- Established: September 23, 1822; 203 years ago
- Location: Praça do Comércio North Wing, Lisbon, Portugal
- Coordinates: 38°42′30.762″N 9°8′11.0508″W
- Composition method: Judges of the Court are appointed on selection and elect chief judge
- Authorised by: Constitution of Portugal
- Appeals to: Constitutional Court, on matters of constitutionality
- Appeals from: Courts of Appeal and First Instance Courts
- Judge term length: Single term of 5 years as chief judge; until age 70 for the remaining judges
- Number of positions: 64
- Website: www.stj.pt

President
- Currently: João Cura Mariano
- Since: 4 June 2024

The Supreme Court of Justice (Note: Portuguese: Supremo Tribunal de Justiça, pronounced [suˈpɾemu tɾiβuˈnal dɨ ʒuʃˈtisɐ]) (STJ), is the highest court of law in Portugal without prejudice to the jurisdiction of the Constitutional Court.

The judges of the STJ are referred to as counselors. (Note: conselheiros) Its president is elected by and from among the judges of the court.

The STJ is installed in the buildings of the northern wing of the Praça do Comércio, also known as Terreiro do Paço, square in Lisbon.

== Competences ==
The competences of the Supreme Court of Justice are the following:

- To try the President of Portugal, the President of the Assembly of the Republic and the Prime Minister of Portugal for crimes committed during the exercise of their office;
- To harmonize rulings by setting uniform jurisprudence;
- To hear appeals in matters of law;
- To try crimes committed by the members of the Supreme Court, of the Courts of Appeal or Public Prosecutors.

== History ==
The Supreme Court of Justice was created by the Constitution of 1822 and installed eleven years after, in the scope of the separation of the judicial power from the others, dictated by the establishment of the Portuguese Constitutional Monarchy.

The STJ replaced the ancient higher courts of the kingdom, namely the Board of Conscience and Orders (Mesa da Consciência e Ordens) created in 1532, the Desembargo of the Palace (Desembargo do Paço) regulated in 1533 and the Council of State (Conselho de Estado) regulated in 1562. The judges of the STJ inherited the title of "counselors" until then worn by the members of the Board of Conscience and Orders and of the Council of State.

== See also ==
- Judiciary of Portugal
  - Constitutional Court of Portugal
  - Portuguese Court of Audits
  - Portuguese Supreme Administrative Court
- Politics of Portugal
- Constitution of Portugal
