= Jácome Ratton =

Franco-Portuguese businessman

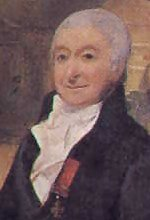
Jacome Ratton

Jacques or Jácome Ratton (7 July 1736 in Monestier de Briançon, Hautes-Alpes – 3 July 1820 in Paris) was a Franco-Portuguese businessman, who was a leading figure in the mainly foreign group of industrialists in 18th-century Portugal. He published his Memoirs (Recordaçoens) in 1813 in exile in London, which remain a significant source on Portuguese economic life in the period.

== Early life ==
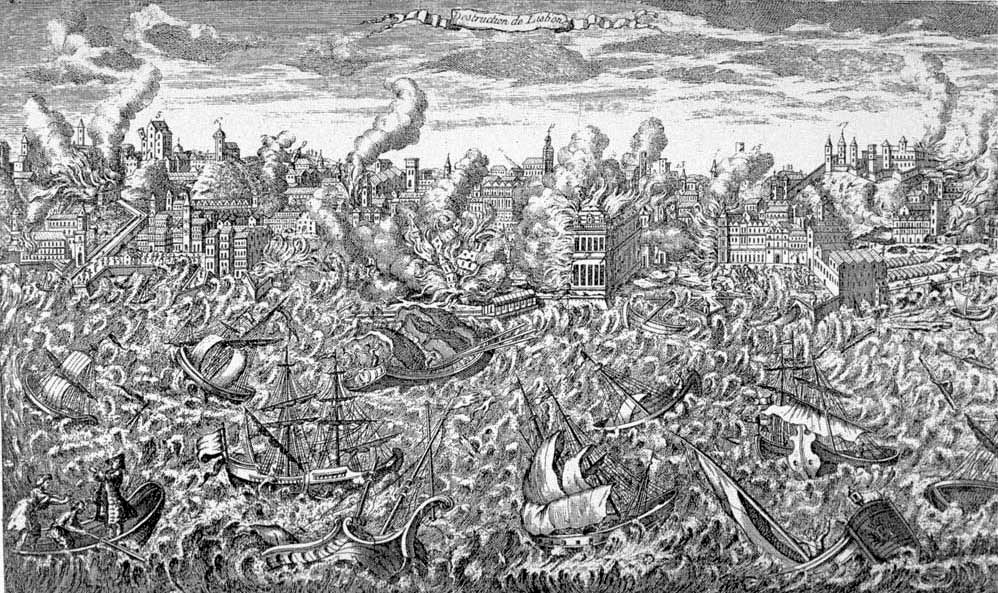
This engraving of the 1755 Lisbon earthquake shows the ruins of Lisbon in flames and a tsunami overwhelming the ships in the harbour.

His father was Jacques (in Portugal called Jácome) Ratton (died Mâcon, France in 1779), the son of a Conseil du Roi (in effect a public prosecutor) in Mâcon of the same name, and his wife Jeanne Orsel. Soon after the birth of his eldest son by his marriage to Françoise Bellon (died Mâcon, 1794), daughter of Jacques Bellon and a mother of the Berard family, Jacques emigrated to Portugal, where his brother-in-law Jacques Bellon was already established in Porto, married to Marie Purat.

Jacques Ratton emigrated to Portugal soon after the birth of his son Jácome, who was brought up by his grandparents and educated in France, before joining his parents at the age of fourteen in Portugal – a pattern typical of the French mercantile community, which Jácome was to repeat with his own children. His Memoirs stress the importance of this – he is highly critical of the backwardness of the Portuguese mercantile classes, who he said hardly used double-entry bookkeeping and were generally unbusiness-like in their ways. In 1758, Jácome Ratton married Ana Isabel Clamous, daughter of the French Consul in Porto (again, a son would marry the daughter of another Consul), and in 1762, when France and Portugal were on opposite sides in the Seven Years' War, he was naturalised as Portuguese. However, the Introduction to the 1920 Coimbra edition of his memoirs mentions that, nearly fifty years later, his Portuguese has "irregularidades gramaticais". His father had moved to Lisbon and was in business, including a partnership with his brother-in-law in Oporto; after Jacome was established in business he retired to France. The 1755 Lisbon earthquake, vividly described in the Memoirs, caused great losses for the business: 300,000 cruzados, according to the Memoirs.

== Industrialist ==
Jacome was an inventive and successful businessman, whose enterprises included a dye-works, a textile mill in Tomar, a paper mill in Elvas, and factories making felt hats in Elvas and Lisbon, the building for which still exists. The Tomar textile mill was the first in Portugal to use modern machinery, and created what was until recently the main industry of the town. The hats were made under a monopoly, though he criticises these in his Memoirs, saying that businessmen should be rewarded with titles instead. He traded in cloth, cognac, Bohemian window-glass, and other products. He invested in sea-salt making at Alcochete, near his country estate, and was also responsible for introducing the eucalyptus to Portugal (a rather mixed blessing), as well as the Araucaria ("monkey-puzzle tree"). His memoirs recount how he made designs for a type of water-pump new to Portugal from a Dutch print.

== Protege of Pombal ==
The Marquis of Pombal, the Portuguese prime minister, was keen to encourage industry in Portugal, and consulted with Ratton, although it was not until after Pombal's death that he was made a member of the Real Junta de Commercio, Agricultura, e Navegação, which played an important part in Pombal's efforts to stimulate, and regulate, Portuguese commerce. Ratton was made a Knight of the Order of Christ (who had opposed his mill at their headquarters in Tomar) and ennobled as a nobleman of the royal household. He lived in Lisbon in the neo-classical Ratton Palace, near his hattery, which (partly remodelled by his son Diogo) is now the home of the Portuguese Constitutional Court, with a large country estate at Barroca d’Alva on the Tagus estuary as well, where he reclaimed land.

== War and exile ==
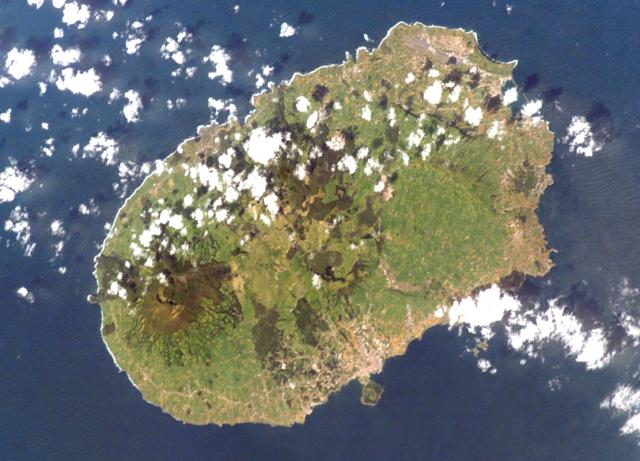
Terceira Island seen from the Space Shuttle

The French invasion of 1807 not only destroyed commerce but put the Franco-Portuguese community, of which Jacombe was the most prominent member, in a difficult position. It did not help that General Paul Thiébault, the chief-of-staff to Junot, the French commander, had billeted himself at Jacome's house, and they became friends. After they lost the Battle of Vimeiro in 1808, the French negotiated a withdrawal from Portugal with the British (to the fury of British public opinion). In June 1810 the Regency government in Lisbon persuaded the Prince-Regent in Rio de Janeiro to dismiss Jacome from the Junta after twenty-two years, and in September the same year he was arrested along with many "radicals" and exiled to the small island of Terceira in the Azores. He managed, perhaps through his Freemason connections, to convert this into exile in England, where he remained until ca. 1816, before moving to Paris, where he died. The King had invited him to return to Portugal, but though several of his children were there, he declined.

He married Ana Isabel Clamouse, daughter of Bernard Clamouse, from Languedoc, and Geneviève Hartsoeker (she was probably the granddaughter of the scientist Nicolaas Hartsoeker), and they had four sons and four daughters. His son Diogo Ratton was appointed to a commission to improve Portuguese commerce; when no report was published he began to publish his own views in 1821 in a series of short works: Reflexões sobre o Commercio, sobre as Alfandegas, sobre os Depositos, e sobre as Pautas with his proposal for a "Tribunal do Commercio" and other reforms. Diogo's letters to António Araujo de Azevedo, Comte da Barca (1812–1817) were published in 1973 (Paris, Fondation C. Gulbenkian, 1973).

His memoirs, whose short title was Recordaçoens de Jacome Ratton sobre ocurrencias do seu tempo em Portugal de Maio de 1747 Setembro de 1810, were published in Portuguese in London by H. Bryer in 1813. They were probably first written in French and a manuscript fair copy in French, with an inscription recording its presentation by Ratton to General Paul Thiébault, was on the English book market in the 2010s. There have been two 20th-century Portuguese editions, Coimbra University Press, 1920 and Lisbon: Fenda, 1992.

A school and a sports centre in Tomar are named after him.

== Sources ==
=== Memoirs ===
The Memoirs are the principal source for all details of Ratton's life up to 1810:

- Recordaçoens de Jacome Ratton sobre ocurrencias do seu tempo em Portugal de Maio de 1747 Setembro de 1810, London: H. Bryer, 1813.
- Modern editions: Coimbra: University Press, 1920, Online PDF, 394 pages; Lisbon: Fenda, 1992
- A manuscript translation into French by the author also exists (see link below).

Bibliography

-Michèle Janin-Thivos, Marchands migrants du Briançonnais, Monestier de Briançon au XVIIIe siècle, 2018 Editions du Fournel.

=== External links, and sources ===
- XIV International Economic History Congress, Helsinki 2006, Merchant networks and the Brazilian gold: reappraising national abilities.Leonor Freire Costa & Maria Manuela Rocha, pp 8, 9 & passim
- Description of MS translation into French of the Memoirs
- Genealogy, partly in Portuguese
- Photo of Palacio Ratton in Lisbon
- extracts from the Memoirs in Portuguese
- Jacome Ratton from "Portugal – Dicionário Histórico, Corográfico, Heráldico, Biográfico, Bibliográfico, Numismático e Artístico, Volume VI" 1904–15
