= Constitutional Court (Portugal) =

Supreme Court in Portugal

- Tribunal Constitucional
- Constitutional Court logo

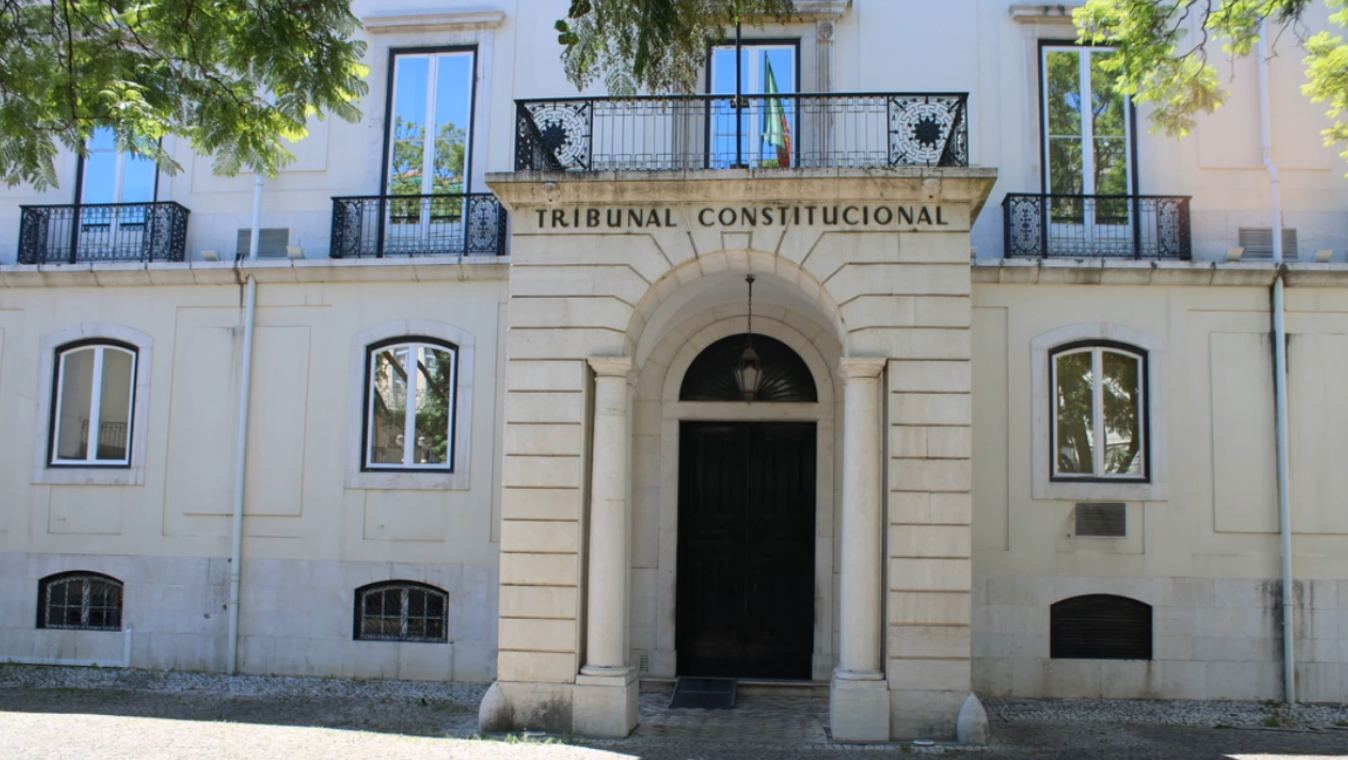
- Ratton Palace in Bairro Alto, Lisbon, seat of the Constitutional Court
- Interactive map of Constitutional Court
- 38°42′50.382″N 9°8′52.1124″W
- Established: November 3, 1982; 43 years ago
- Location: Ratton Palace, Rua do Século 111, Lisbon, Portugal
- Coordinates: 38°42′50.382″N 9°8′52.1124″W
- Composition method: 10 justices elected by the parliament, 3 justices elected by co-option
- Authorised by: Constitution of Portugal
- Appeals to: None
- Judge term length: 9 years
- Number of positions: 13
- Website: TC

President of the Constitutional Court
- Currently: João Carlos Loureiro
- Since: April 26, 2023

The Constitutional Court (Portuguese: Tribunal Constitucional, pronounced [tɾiβuˈnal kõʃtitusiuˈnal]) is the supreme constitutional court of Portugal. It is defined by the Portuguese Constitution as part of the judicial branch of the Portuguese political organization. Unlike the rest of the country's courts, the Constitutional Court has important characteristics, such as a special composition, and unique competences. The main task of the court is to review the constitutionality of the newly approved laws, but it also has important powers related to the president of the republic, the political parties, and referendums.

The Portuguese Constitution defines the Constitutional Court as a completely independent organ that operates independently from the other branches of government, such as the executive or the legislative. The justices of the Constitutional Court are independent and cannot be impeached. The decisions of the court are above the decisions of any other authority.

The court convenes in Lisbon, in the Ratton Palace located in Bairro Alto.

== Organization ==
Created in 1982, following a a constitutional review, the court is composed by thirteen justices, ten of whom are elected by the Assembly of the Republic, the main legislative branch of the country, and they must be elected by two-thirds majority of the members of the Assembly. The remaining three are elected by the already elected justices. Of the thirteen justices, six must be chosen among the general court's judges, and the remainder must have at least a degree in law. The justices serve a nine-year mandate and cannot be re-elected.

The Constitutional Court elects its own president and vice-president and approves its own rules, schedule and budget.

The president of the Constitutional Court (together with the president of the Supreme Court) is the fourth person in the Portuguese state hierarchy (after the president of the republic, the president of the Assembly of the Republic, and the prime minister, in that order) and has several competences, such as conducting the relations between the court and the other authorities, receiving the candidatures for president of the republic and presiding the court's sessions. The current president (as of 2026) is João Carlos Loureiro.

== Competences ==
The Constitutional Court has several competences, defined in the Constitution, such as:

- Assure that the Constitution and regional autonomies are respected;
- Review and assure the constitutionality of the laws;
- Declare the president's death or inability to carry out his tasks;
- Manage the electoral processes;
- Assure that political parties fulfil the legal requirements to exist;
- Prohibit and dissolve fascist parties and organizations;
- Assure the legality of the national and local referendums.

== Judges ==
Current composition of the Court.

| No. | Judge | Party designation | Tenure | | Alma mater | Career path |
| No. | Judge | Party designation | Start | End | Alma mater | Career path |
|---|---|---|---|---|---|---|
| 1 | Judge President; João Carlos Loureiro | Co-opted Social Democratic | 25 April 2023 | 2032 | University of Coimbra | Professor at University of Coimbra |
| 2 | Deputy Judge President; Rui Guerra da Fonseca | Co-opted Socialist | 25 April 2023 | 2032 | University of Lisbon | Professor at University of Lisbon |
| 3 | Judge; Mariana Canotilho | Communist | 2 April 2019 | 2028 | University of Coimbra | Legal Advisor at the Constitutional Court |
| 4 | Judge; Afonso Patrão | Social Democratic | 12 October 2021 | 2030 | University of Coimbra | Legal Advisor at the Constitutional Court |
| 5 | Judge; José Ascensão Ramos | Socialist | 12 October 2021 | 2030 | University of Coimbra | Presiding Judge of the Leiria District Court |
| 6 | Judge; José Eduardo Figueiredo Dias | Social Democratic | 12 October 2021 | 2030 | University of Coimbra | President of the Entity for Political Accounts and Financing |
| 7 | Judge; Maria Benedita Urbano | Social Democratic | 12 October 2021 | 2030 | University of Coimbra | Advisor to the Supreme Administrative Court |
| 8 | Judge; Carlos Carvalho | Co-opted Independent | 25 April 2023 | 2032 | University of Lisbon | Advisor to the Supreme Administrative Court |
| 9 | Judge; Dora Lucas Neto | Socialist | 11 December 2023 | 2032 | University of Lisbon | Advisor to the Supreme Administrative Court |
| 10 | Judge; Joaquim Cardoso da Costa | Social Democratic | 15 June 2026 | 2035 | University of Coimbra | Director of the State Legal Center |
| 11 | Judge; Gabriela Cunha Rodrigues | Socialist | 15 June 2026 | 2035 | University of Lisbon | Chief of Staff to the President of the Supreme Court of Justice |
| 12 | Judge; Maria Paula Ribeiro Faria | Social Democratic | 15 June 2026 | 2035 | University of Coimbra | Professor at Porto's Catholic University |
| 13 | Judge; Luís Filipe Brites Lameiras | Chega | 15 June 2026 | 2035 | University of Lisbon | Judge of Lisbon's Court of Appeal |

== See also ==
- Judiciary of Portugal
  - Portuguese Supreme Court of Justice
  - Portuguese Court of Auditors
  - Portuguese Supreme Administrative Court
- Politics of Portugal
- Constitution of Portugal
