= Constitution of Portugal =

Supreme law of Portugal since 1976

Constitution of the Portuguese Republic

Overview
- Jurisdiction: Portugal
- Ratified: 2 April 1976
- Date effective: 25 April 1976
- System: Semi-presidential republic

Government structure
- Branches: 4
- Head of state: President with significant reserve powers
- Chambers: Unicameral (Assembly of the Republic)
- Executive: Government, headed by a Prime Minister
- Judiciary: Constitutional Court, Supreme Court of Justice and lower general courts, Supreme Administrative Court and lower administrative courts and Court of Auditors
- Federalism: Unitary state, but the outermost archipelagoes enjoy self-government
- Electoral college: No
- Entrenchments: 15 (14 material ones and a circumstantial one)

History
- First legislature: 3 June 1976
- First executive: 23 July 1976
- Amendments: 7
- Last amended: 2005
- Author: Constituent Assembly of Portugal
- Signatories: Henrique de Barros and Francisco da Costa Gomes
- Supersedes: Portuguese Constitution of 1933

Full text
- Constitution of the Portuguese Republic at Wikisource

The Constitution of Portugal, officially the Constitution of the Portuguese Republic (Constituição da República Portuguesa), is the supreme law of Portugal. Approved on 2 April 1976 and becoming effective on 25 April of the same year, it superseded the Estado Novo's 1933 Constitution after the Carnation Revolution. The 1976 Constitution has been amended or revised seven times since its ratification, in 1982, 1989, 1992, 1997, 2001, 2004 and 2005.

The Constitution was preceded by a number of constitutions including the first one created in 1822 (following the Liberal Revolution of 1820), 1826 (drawn up by King Dom Pedro IV), 1838 (after the Liberal Wars), 1911 (following the 5 October 1910 revolution), and 1933 (after the 28 May 1926 coup d'état).

== Constitution of 1976 ==
The Constitution of 1976 was drafted by a Constituent Assembly that was elected on 25 April 1975, one year after the Carnation Revolution. It was largely drafted in 1975, then finished and officially promulgated in early 1976. Portugal's democratic future was still unclear at the time of the constitution's drafting. Even after a leftist coup had been put down in November 1975, it was not known if the armed forces would respect the assembly and allow work on the constitution to go forward. The Movimento das Forças Armadas (MFA, English: Armed Forces Movement) and leftist groups pressured and cajoled the assembly, and there was much discussion of establishing a revolutionary and socialist system of government. Moreover, not all of the assembly's members were committed to parliamentary democracy. The membership was intensely partisan, with some 60 percent of the seats occupied by the left.

After prolonged deliberation, the Constituent Assembly eventually adopted a constitution that provided for a democratic, parliamentary system with political parties, elections, a parliament, and a prime minister. The document also established an independent judiciary and enumerated and provided for the protection of several human rights. Although relatively few of these provisions are exceptional, some of the constitution's features are noteworthy, including its ideological content, its provision for the role of the military, and its dual presidential-parliamentary system.

Until the constitutional revisions of 1982 and 1989, the constitution was a highly charged ideological document with numerous references to socialism, the rights of workers, and the desirability of a socialist economy. It severely restricted private investment and business activity. Many of these articles were advanced by Portuguese Communist Party (PCP) representatives in the Constituent Assembly, but they were also advocated by members of the Socialist Party (PS), who at that time were seeking to be as revolutionary as the other left groups. The resulting document proclaimed that the object of the republic was "to ensure the transition to socialism." The constitution also urged the state to "socialize the means of production and abolish the exploitation of man by man," phrases that echoed Karl Marx's Communist Manifesto. Workers' Committees were given the right to supervise the management of enterprises and to have their representatives elected to the boards of state-owned firms. The government, among many admonitions in the same vein, was to "direct its work toward the socialization of medicine and the medicopharmaceutical sectors".

Next, the military was given great political power through the role given by the constitution to the MFA-controlled Revolutionary Council that made the MFA a separate and practically co-equal branch of government. The council was to be an advisory body to the president (who was at first likely to come from the military itself), and would function as a sort of constitutional court to ensure that the laws passed by parliament were in accordance with the MFA's desires and did not undermine the achievements of the revolution. The council was also to serve as a high-level decision-making body for the armed forces themselves. The council was a concession to the MFA for allowing the Constituent Assembly to sit and promulgate a new "basic law." Some of the Portuguese left, especially the PCP, supported the idea.

The final innovative feature of the constitution was its creation of a system of government that was both presidential and parliamentary. The Constituent Assembly favored two centers of power so as to avoid both the dangers of an excessively powerful executive, as was the case during Salazar's Estado Novo regime, and the weaknesses arising from prolonged periods of parliamentary instability, as was the case during the First Republic.

The constitution was controversial from the start. It was widely seen in political circles as a compromise document in which all the parties contributing to it had been able to incorporate in it provisions they found vital. The constitution's parliamentary sections had the support of PS, the Social Democratic Party (PSD), and the Democratic and Social Centre (CDS); its socialist content had the support of the PCP, its allies, and the PS.

Even before the constitution became law, politicians had agreed to change some provisions after the five-year period in which changes were prohibited (although some circles of the PS and PSD wanted to change it prior to that threshold). Objections to the document centered on its ideological content, its restrictions on certain economic activities, and its institutionalization of the military's role in the country's governance. The CDS, the party furthest to the right among those which had participated in the document's drafting, refused to ratify it. However, the party agreed to abide by it in the interim.

=== 1st review (1982) ===
By the early 1980s, the political climate was ripe for constitutional reform. The centre-right conservative coalition Democratic Alliance, formed by the PSD, the CDS, and the People's Monarchist Party, the PPM, was in power; the PS had been voted out of office, and the PCP was politically isolated. The first amendments, enacted in 1982, dealt with the constitution's political arrangements. Although many of the economic provisions of the constitution had not been implemented and were, in effect, ignored, there were not yet enough votes to reach the required two-thirds majority needed for their amendment.

The 1982 amendments were enacted through the ample votes of the AD and the PS. This combination of centre-right and centre-left political forces managed to end the military's control of Portuguese politics. It abolished the Council of the Revolution, controlled by the military, and replaced it with two consultative bodies. One of these, the Higher Council of National Defense, was limited to commenting on military matters. The other, the Council of State, is composed by the President himself, plus former presidents, plus other prominent elected and non-elected figures of the Portuguese state, and it does not have the power to prevent government and parliamentary actions by declaring them unconstitutional. Another amendment created a Constitutional Court to review the constitutionality of legislation. Ten of its thirteen judges were chosen by the Assembly of the Republic. Another important change reduced the president's power by restricting presidential ability to dismiss the government, timeline to dissolve parliament, or veto legislation.

=== 2nd review (1989) ===
Despite the 1982 amendments, centrists and conservatives continued to criticize the constitution as too ideological and economically restrictive. Hence, the constitution was amended again in 1989. Many economic restrictions were removed and much ideological language eliminated, while governmental structures remained unchanged. The most important change enabled the state to privatize much of the property and many of the enterprises nationalized after 1974 revolution.

== Provisions ==
The Portuguese Constitution includes the Preamble and 296 articles. The articles are organized in the Fundamental Principles, four parts plus the Final Dispositions. The parts are subdivided in titles and some of the titles are subdivided in chapters.

=== Preamble ===
The preamble to the Constitution consists of the enacting formula:

On the 25th of April 1974 the Armed Forces Movement crowned the long resistance and reflected the deepest feelings of the Portuguese people by overthrowing the fascist regime.

Freeing Portugal from dictatorship, oppression and colonialism represented a revolutionary change and the beginning of an historic turning point for Portuguese society.

The Revolution restored their fundamental rights and freedoms to the people of Portugal. In the exercise of those rights and freedoms, the people's legitimate representatives are gathered to draw up a Constitution that matches the country's aspirations.

The Constituent Assembly affirms the Portuguese people's decision to defend national independence, guarantee citizens' fundamental rights, establish the basic principles of democracy, ensure the primacy of a democratic state based on the rule of law and open up a path towards a socialist society, with respect for the will of the Portuguese people and with a view to the construction of a country that is freer, more just and more fraternal.

Meeting in plenary session on 2 April 1976, the Constituent Assembly does hereby pass and decree the following Constitution of the Portuguese Republic:

=== Fundamental principles ===
The fundamental principles cover the first eleven articles (1st to 11th) of the Constitution.

This part covers the general Constitutional principles, stating the status of Portugal as sovereign republic (Article 1), the status of the Portuguese Republic as a state based on the democratic rule of law (Article 2), the sovereignty residing in the people and the legality being subordinate to the Constitution (Article 3), the Portuguese citizenship (Article 4), the territory of Portugal (Article 5), the status of the State as being unitary (Article 6), the governance of Portugal in the international relations (Article 7), the incorporation of the international law in the Portuguese law (Article 8), the definition of the main tasks of the State (Article 9), the universal suffrage and political parties (Article 10) and the national symbols and official language (Article 11).

=== Part 1: Fundamental rights and duties ===
The Part 1 of the Constitution defines the fundamental rights and duties. It includes 68 articles (12 to 79), subdivided in three titles.

Title 1 states the general principles of the fundamental rights and duties.

Title 2 refers the rights, liberties and guaranties, namely the personal ones (Chapter I), the political participation ones (Chapter II) and the workers ones (Chapter III).

Title 3 refers the economical, social and cultural rights and duties, these being covered respectively by the chapters 1, 2 and 3.

=== Part 2: Economical organization ===
The Part 2 defines the economical organization and includes 28 articles (80 to 107), subdivided in four titles.

Title 1 states the general principles of the economical organization.

Title 2 refers to the plans.

Title 3 refers to the agricultural, commercial and industrial policies.

Title 4 refers to the financial and tax system.

=== Part 3: Organization of the political power ===
The Part 3 defines the political organization and includes 169 articles (108 to 276), subdivided in ten titles.

Title 1 states the general principles of the organization of the political power.

Title 2 refers to the President of the Republic, stating his/her status and election (Chapter 1), his/her competency (Chapter 2) and the Council of State (Chapter III).

Title 3 refers to the Assembly of the Republic, stating its status and election (Chapter 1), its competencies (Chapter 2) and its organization and functioning (Chapter 3).

Title 4 refers to the Government, stating its function and structure (Chapter 1), its formation and responsibility (Chapter 2) and its competencies (Chapter 3).

Title 5 refers to the Courts, stating their general principles (Chapter 1), their organization (Chapter 2), the status of the judges (Chapter 3) and the Public Ministry (Chapter 4).

Title 6 refers to the Constitutional Court.

Title 7 refers to the autonomous regions.

Title 8 refers to the local power, stating its general principles (Chapter 1) and specifying the freguesia (Chapter 2), the municipality (Chapter 3), the administrative region (Chapter 4) and the organization of dwellers (Chapter 5).

Title 9 refers to the public administration.

Title 10 refers to the national defense.

=== Part 4: Guarantee and revision of the Constitution ===
The Part 4 defines the guarantee and revision of the Constitution, including 13 articles (277 to 289), subdivided in two titles.

Title 1 refers to the review of constitutionality.

Title 2 refers to the constitutional revision.

=== Final and transitory dispositions ===
The last part of the Constitution, covering seven articles (290th to 296th), defines the final and transitory dispositions.

It refers to the status of the previous law, to the transitory existence of the districts, to the criminalization and judgement of the former officers of the PIDE/DGS, to the re-privatization of the goods nationalized after the 25 April 1974, to the transitory regime applicable to bodies of local government, to the referendum about the European Treaty and to the date and entry in force of the Constitution.

== Former Portuguese Constitutions ==
=== Constitution of 1822 ===
The Portuguese Constitution of 1822 (Constituição Política da Monarquia Portuguesa, "Political Constitution of the Portuguese Monarchy") approved on 23 September 1822 was the first Portuguese constitution, marking an attempt to end absolutism and introduce a constitutional monarchy. Although it was actually in force only for two brief periods, 1822–23 and 1836–1838, it was fundamental to the history of democracy in Portugal. It was replaced by the Constitutional Charter of 1826.

=== Constitutional Charter of 1826 ===
The Charter of 1826 or Carta Constitucional, often simply referred to as the Carta, was the second constitution in Portuguese history. It was given to the country in 1826 by King Dom Pedro IV. In contrast to the first constitution, the Portuguese Constitution of 1822, approved by the constitutional assembly or cortes (see the Liberal Revolution of 1820, the Carta was an imposed constitution issued by the king under his own authority without the involvement of the people. It served as the constitution of Portugal from 1826 to 1828, from 1834 to 1836 and from 1842 until the end of the monarchy in 1910.

=== Constitution of 1838 ===
The Political Constitution of the Portuguese Monarchy (Constituição Política da Monarquia Portuguesa) of 1838 was the third Portuguese constitution. After the September Revolution in 1836, the Constitutional Charter of 1826 was abolished and in its place the Constitution of 1822 was temporarily restored, while a constituent Cortes was convened to produce a new constitution. This was agreed, and Maria II swore an oath to it on 4 April 1838. It was a synthesis of the previous constitution of 1822 and 1826, with the establishment of an elected Senate rather than a House of Peers also drawn from the 1831 Constitution of Belgium and the Spanish Constitution of 1837. The French constitution of 1830 was also a source of influence.

=== Constitution of 1911 ===
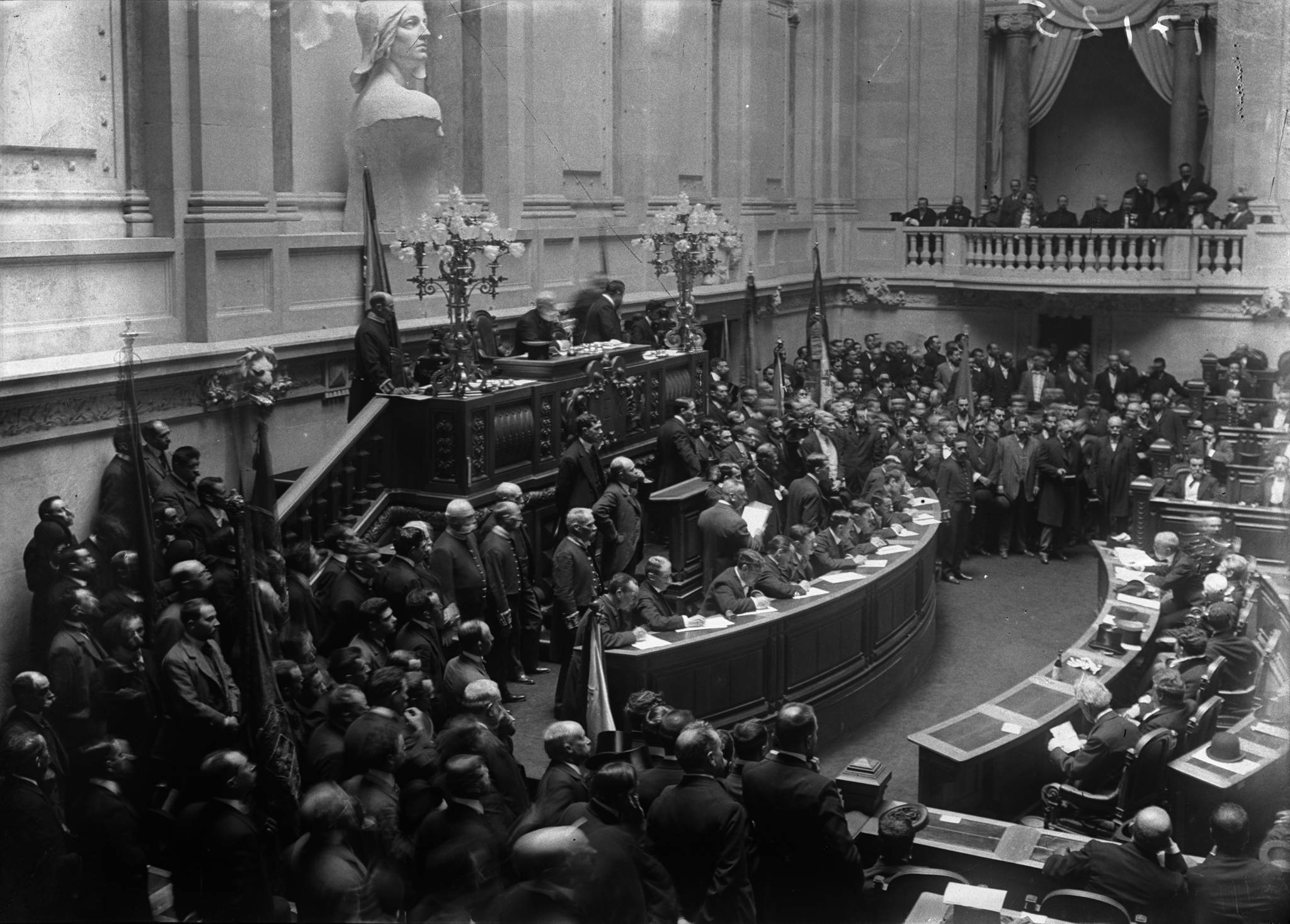
The National Constituent Assembly of the First Portuguese Republic

The Constitution of 1911 (Constituição Política da República Portuguesa, "Political Constitution of the Portuguese Republic") was voted on 21 August 1911, and it was the basic law of the Portuguese First Republic. It was the fourth Portuguese constitution and the first republican constitution.

=== Constitution of 1933 ===
The Portuguese Constitution of 1933 was introduced by Prime Minister António de Oliveira Salazar in 1933, establishing the basis of the authoritarian Estado Novo regime, the constitution came into force on 11 April 1933, following the 1933 Portuguese constitutional referendum. It is credited as the first constitution of any recognized country embracing corporatist principles (though predated significantly by the Charter of Carnaro), espousing a bicameral parliament, including a western-styled National Assembly, elected directly every four years, and the Corporative Chamber, representing different "corporations", schools, universities, colonies and local municipalities, in effect appointed by the National Assembly after its inaugural. The role of the Corporative Chamber was limited to that of an advisory body, while all legislation was handled by the Assembly under the direction of its only party or "movement", the National Union, an ideology-lacking beacon completely subordinate to the Salazar administration.

The executive branch was headed by a president, who was directly elected for seven years without term limits. He was vested with sweeping executive powers; on paper, he was practically a dictator. He was assisted by a prime minister responsible solely to him. Indeed, the Constitution did not require the president to even consult the National Assembly in appointing a prime minister. The National Assembly was largely a rubber stamp for decisions already made by Salazar. Notably, it had limited powers to legislate on any matter requiring government expenditures.

Óscar Carmona served as president until his death in 1951. In practice, he mostly turned day-to-day control of the government to Salazar, to the point that the president's prerogative to remove him from office was the only check on his power. Carmona's successor, Craveiro Lopes, showed an independent streak that led Salazar to replace him with Américo Tomás in 1958. For a decade, Tomás was largely a puppet for an aging Salazar. However, after Salazar suffered a stroke in 1968, Tomás replaced him with Marcello Caetano. Tomás was not willing to give Caetano the free hand he'd given Salazar, forcing Caetano to expend nearly all of his political capital to push through even cosmetic attempts at blunting the edge of what had become the longest-lived authoritarian government in Europe. The direct consequence was the coup d'état of 1974.

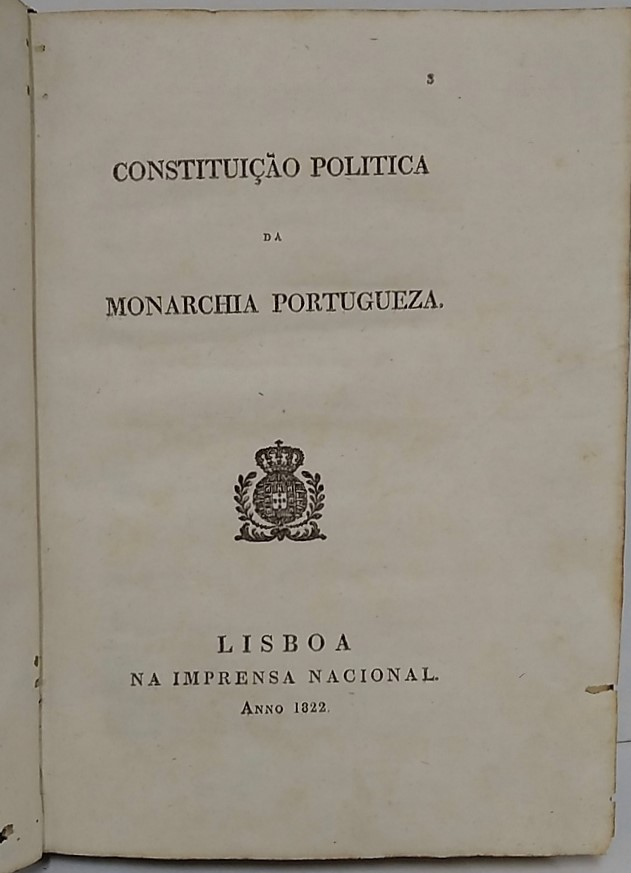
Cover of the 1822 Constitution

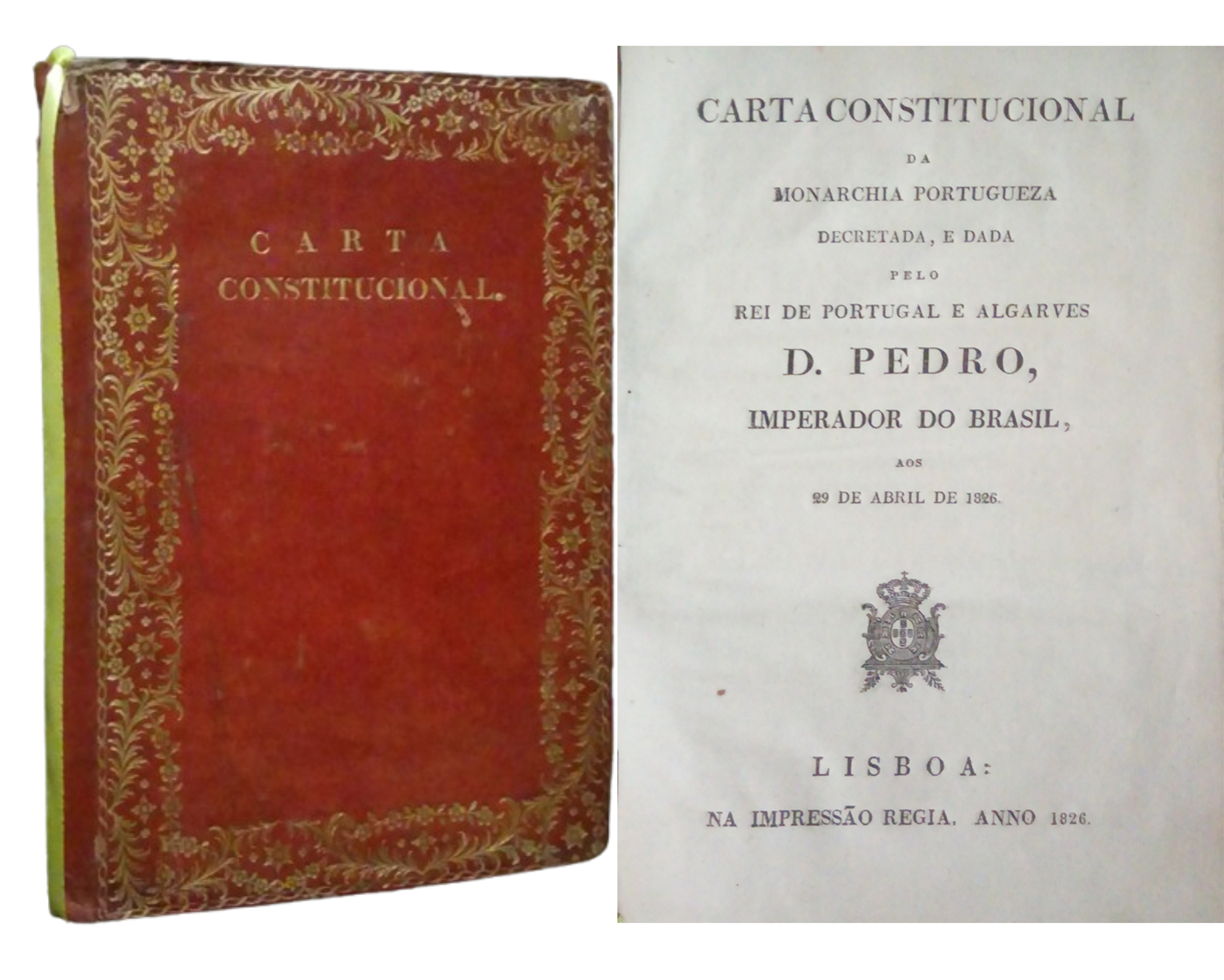
Covers of the 1826 Constitution

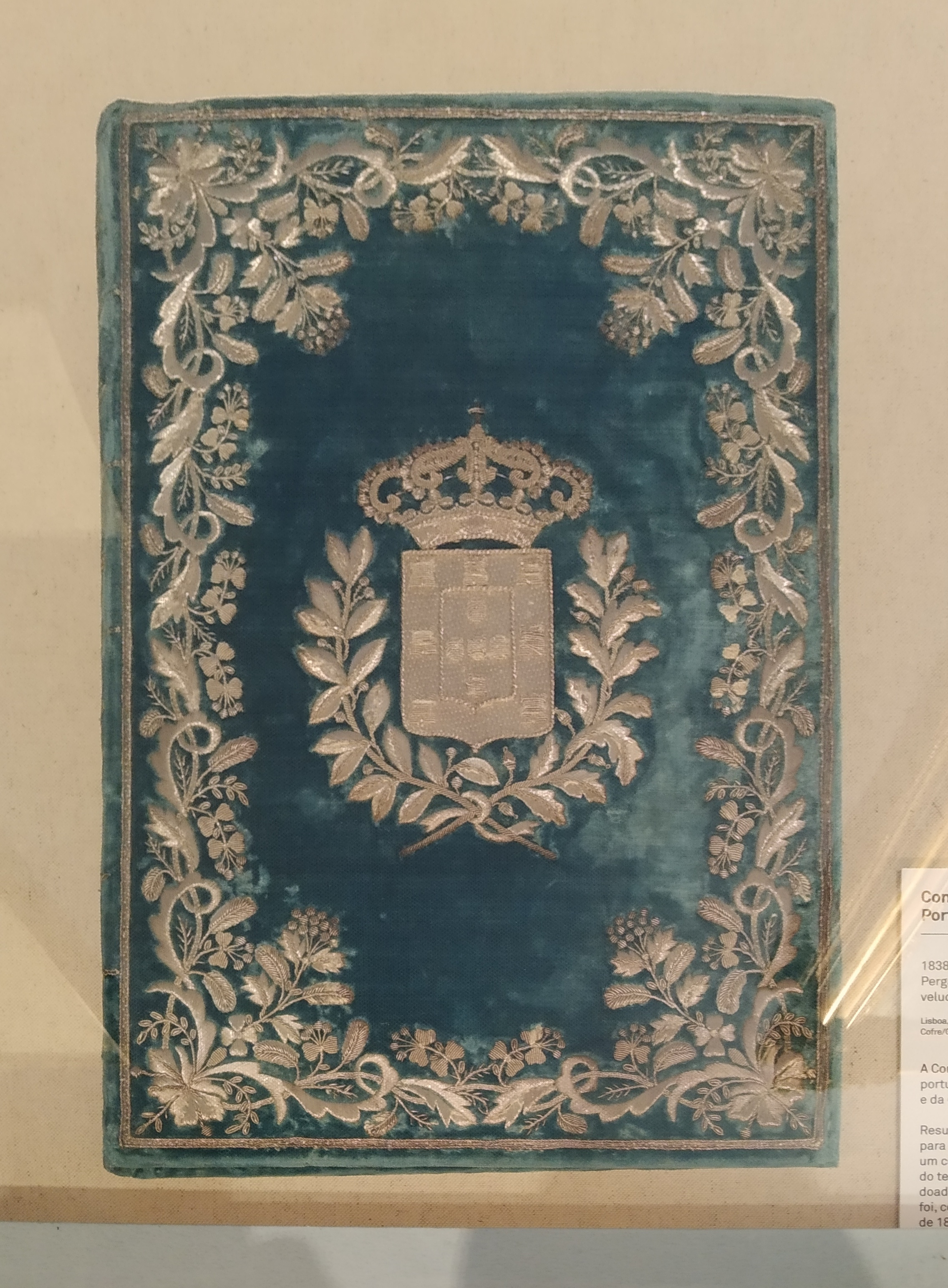
Cover of the 1838 Constitution

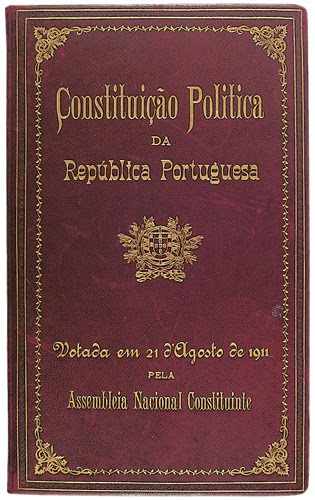
Cover of the 1911 Constitution

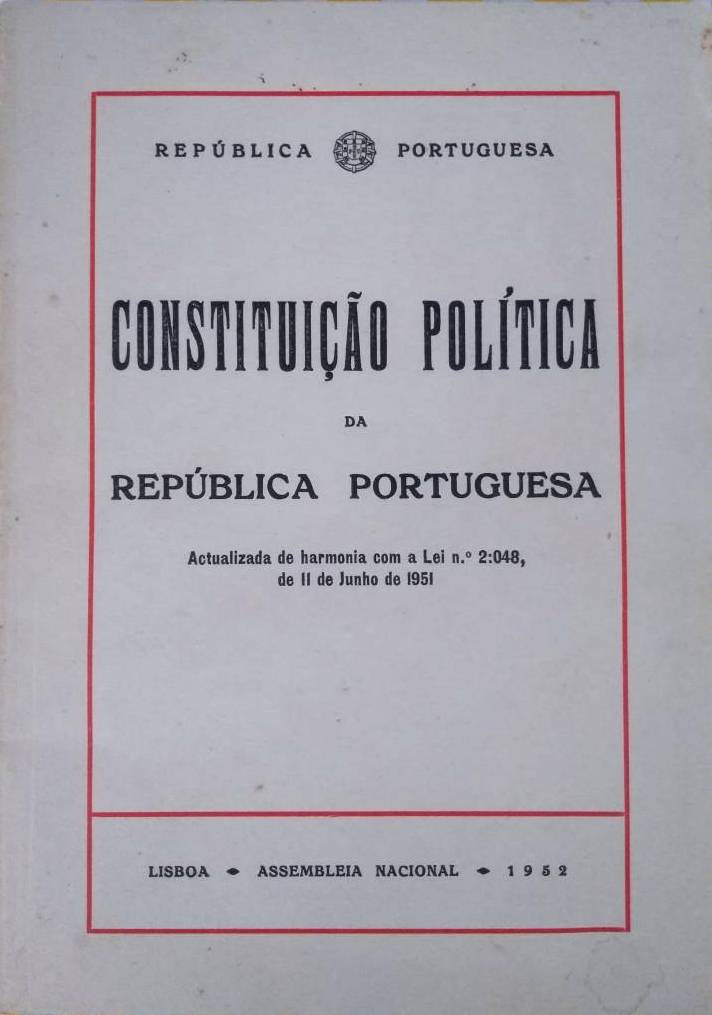
Cover of the 1933 Constitution after the 1951 review

== See also ==
- Constitution of Portugal (1911)
