= Court of Auditors (Portugal) =

High-court in Portugal

Portuguese Court of Auditors
- Tribunal de Contas
- Court of Auditors logo
- Interactive map of Portuguese Court of Auditors
- 38°44′24.2736″N 9°8′48.588″W
- Established: November 10, 1849; 176 years ago
- Location: Avenida da República 65, Lisbon, Portugal
- Coordinates: 38°44′24.2736″N 9°8′48.588″W
- Composition method: President nominates the chief judge; selection of candidates by a jury headed by the president of the Court
- Authorised by: Constitution of Portugal
- Appeals to: Constitutional Court
- Judge term length: 4 years
- Number of positions: 19
- Website: tcontas.pt

President
- Currently: Filipa Urbano Calvão
- Since: 12 October 2024

The Portuguese Court of Auditors (Note: Portuguese: Tribunal de Contas) is the high-court in Portugal responsible for reviewing the legal issues on public expenditure and delivering judgement on those accounts relating to:

- General Accounts of the State
- accounts of the Autonomous Regions of the Azores and of Madeira
- liability of financial offences

== See also ==
- Judiciary of Portugal
- Constitution of Portugal
