= Supreme Administrative Court (Portugal) =

One of the supreme courts of Portugal

- Supremo Tribunal Administrativo (Portuguese)
- Supreme Administrative Court emblem
- Interactive map of Supreme Administrative Court
- 38°42′52.4628″N 9°8′40.4052″W
- Established: October 30, 1933; 92 years ago
- Location: Lisbon
- Coordinates: 38°42′52.4628″N 9°8′40.4052″W
- Composition method: Appointed on selection by the Superior Council of Administrative and Tax Courts
- Authorised by: Portuguese Constitution
- Appeals to: Constitutional Court, on matters of constitutionality
- Appeals from: Central Administrative Courts and Administrative and Tax Courts
- Judge term length: 5 years
- Number of positions: 25
- Website: STA

President of the Supreme Administrative Court
- Currently: Jorge Miguel Barroso de Aragão Seia
- Since: 17 October 2024

Vice-President of the Supreme Administrative Court
- Currently: Francisco António Pedrosa de Areal Rothes
- Since: 2024

The Supreme Administrative Court (Portuguese: Supremo Tribunal Administrativo) is a court in Portugal that deals with matters pertaining to administrative and fiscal legal relations. This court functions without prejudice to the jurisdiction of the Constitutional Court of Portugal.

== See also ==
- Judiciary of Portugal
- Constitution of Portugal
