= 2017 in Portugal =

- Centuries: 19th; 20th; 21st
- Decades: 1990s; 2000s; 2010s; 2020s; 2030s
- See also: List of years in Portugal

Events in the year 2017 in Portugal.

== Incumbents ==
- President: Marcelo Rebelo de Sousa
- Prime Minister: António Costa (Socialist)

== Events ==
=== January to March ===
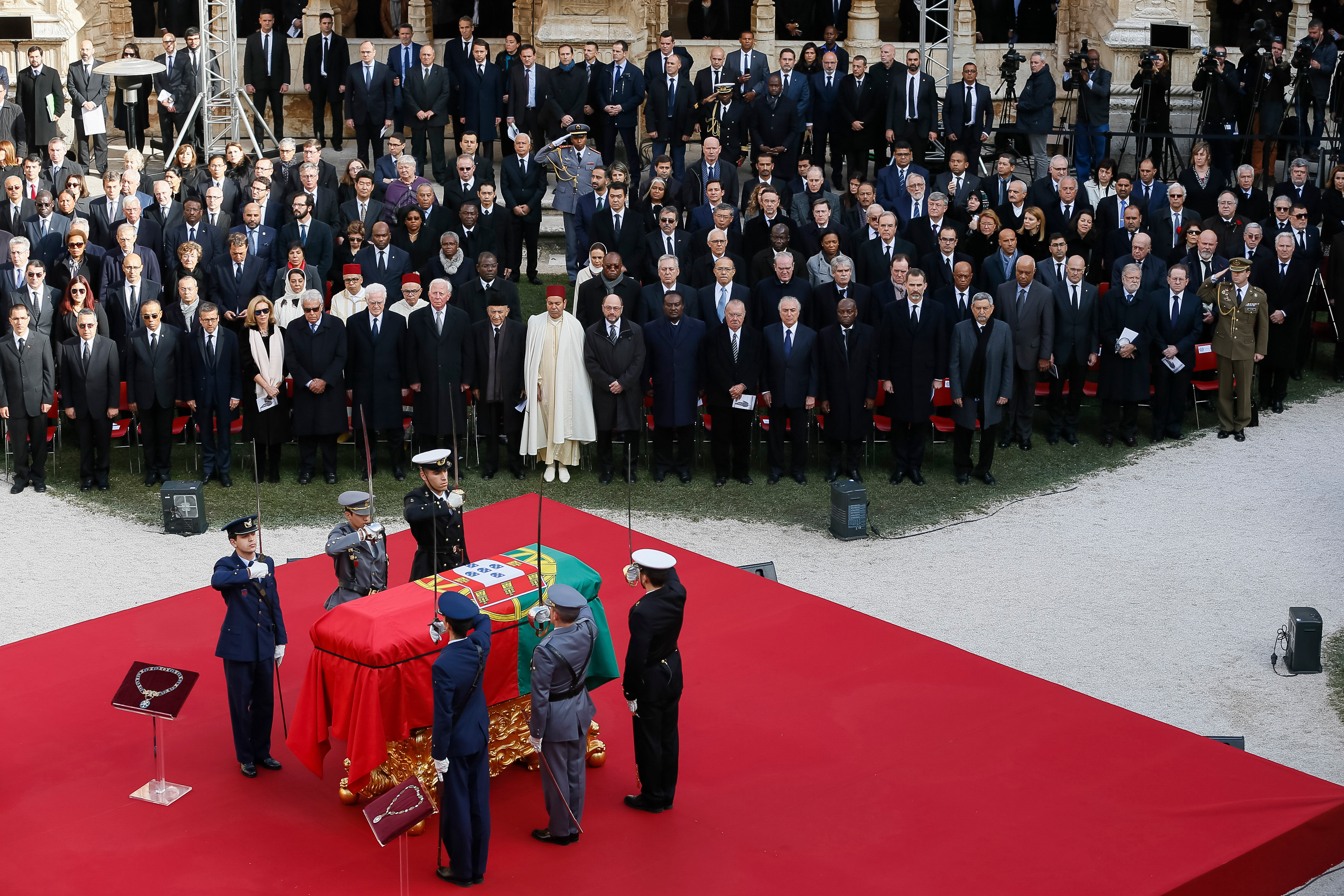
10 January: The state funeral for former President Mário Soares is held

- 1 January – Former Prime Minister António Guterres begins his term as the new Secretary-General of the United Nations.
- 10 January – The state funeral for former President Mário Soares is held in Lisbon three days after his death at the age of 92, with foreign dignitaries including Felipe VI of Spain, the President of Brazil Michel Temer, and former French Prime Minister Lionel Jospin in attendance.
- 1 February – The Supreme Court of Justice dismisses a libel case brought by British couple Kate and Gerry McCann against former police detective Goncalo Amaral, who had accused the couple of being responsible for the disappearance of their daughter Madeleine in Praia da Luz in 2007.
- 8 February – Spanish financial company Caixabank finalises its €645 million takeover of Banco BPI, raising its ownership stake in the Portuguese lender to 84.5%.
- 16 February:
  - Government prosecutors announce that they have filed charges of bribery and corruption against Manuel Vicente, the Vice President of Angola, who is accused of paying $810,000 to a former Portuguese state prosecutor to end earlier investigations of corruption.
  - Data from the Instituto Nacional de Estatística reveals that tourist numbers to Portugal grew for the sixth successive year in 2016, rising to just under 11 million.
- 9 March – Finance Minister Mário Centeno announces plans to create a new independent financial oversight body to supervise the rescue of struggling banks, a power that currently resides with the central Banco de Portugal. The move comes after criticism directed at the Banco de Portugal for failing to predict the failure of Banco Espírito Santo in 2014 and Banif in 2015, among others.
- 29 March – Madeira International Airport is renamed after football player Cristiano Ronaldo in a ceremony attended by President Marcelo Rebelo de Sousa and Prime Minister António Costa.
- 31 March – The Banco de Portugal announces the sale of a 75% controlling stake in Novo Banco to American investment company Lone Star Funds.

=== April to June ===
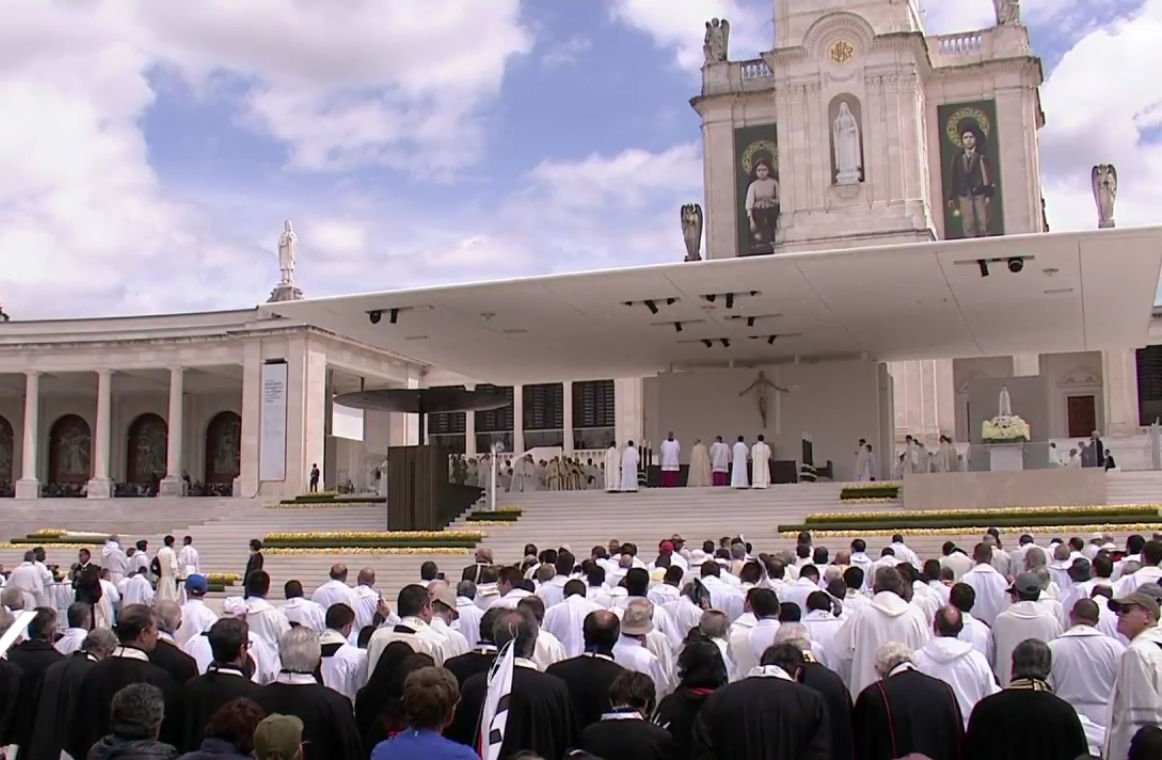
13 May: Pope Francis canonises Francisco and Jacinta Marto in Fátima

- 4 April – An explosion at a fireworks factory in the village of Avoes in the Viseu District kills six people.
- 17 April – Five people are killed and four are injured when an Piper PA-31 Navajo aircraft crashes outside a Lidl supermarket in Tires near Lisbon.
- 13 May:
  - Pope Francis canonises Francisco and Jacinta Marto in a ceremony held at the Sanctuary of Fátima on the centenary of the pair's reported visions of the Virgin Mary.
  - In association football, Benfica secure a fourth consecutive Primeira Liga title with a 5–0 victory over Vitória de Guimarães. It is the club's 36th top-flight championship title.
  - Salvador Sobral is voted the winner of the 2017 Eurovision Song Contest with the song "Amar Pelos Dois", securing Portugal's first victory in the competition.
- 21 May – In motor racing, France's Sébastien Ogier wins the 2017 Rally de Portugal.
- 17 June – A series of wildfires break out across Pedrógão Grande and neighbouring municipalities in central Portugal, killing 64 people and destroying more than 30,000 hectares of forest. Three days of official mourning are declared on 18 June, which sees hundreds of firefighters tackling 156 separate fires, the two largest of which are brought under control over 22–23 June. The outbreak marks the country's deadliest spate of wild fires since 1966.
- 28 June – A theft of weapons at a military base in Tancos, approximately 100 kilometres (62 mi) northeast of Lisbon, is discovered. Five military commanders are provisionally suspended and President Marcelo Rebelo de Sousa orders a full inquiry into the incident. In the days following the discovery the Spanish newspaper El Espaňol obtains and publishes a list of the weapons stolen, which includes gun ammunition, hand and anti-tank grenades, and plastic explosives.

=== July to September ===
- 2 August – Two sunbathers are killed when a Cessna light aircraft is forced to make an emergency landing on a crowded beach in Caparica. The two occupants of the plane, a student pilot and a flying instructor, escape unharmed.
- 15 August:
  - Thirteen people are killed and 49 are injured after a tree falls on attendants of a religious festival near the Madeiran capital of Funchal.
  - In cycling, Spain's Raúl Alarcón wins the 2017 Volta a Portugal.
- 16 August – The National Emergency and Civil Protection Authority reveals that to date 141,000 hectares (540 sq mi) of land has been destroyed by wildfires in 2017, with firefighters attending more than 10,000 fires, a rise of 25% compared to 2016.
- 17 August – Wildfires surround and cut off access to the town of Mação in central Portugal, prompting the evacuation of approximately 130 people from neighbouring settlements.

=== October to December ===
- 1 October – Local elections: The Socialist Party wins the highest number of municipalities and the greatest share of the vote ahead of the Social Democratic Party, which suffers its poorest ever performance in a local election. Prime Minister António Costa hails the result as a "historic victory" for the Socialist Party, while Pedro Passos Coelho announces he will re-evaluate his position as Social Democratic leader in the new year.
- 3 October – Following a meeting of the Social Democratic Party in the aftermath of the local elections, Pedro Passos Coelho states that he will relinquish his role as party leader once the party selects his successor in December.
- 11 October – Former Prime Minister José Sócrates is formally charged by state prosecutors on counts of corruption, money laundering, document forgery, and tax fraud committed between 2006 and 2015.
- 19 October – Interior Minister Constanca Urbano de Sousa resigns from her position after criticism mounts over the government's response to this year's wildfires, which to date have killed more than 100 people. She is replaced in her role by the deputy Prime Minister Eduardo Cabrita.
- 7 November – The Directorate-General of Health confirms that an outbreak of Legionnaires' disease at the São Francisco Xavier hospital in Lisbon has killed two of 34 infected patients.
- 30 November – The government is accused of censorship by the University of Coimbra's Xavier Viegas, an author of an official report into the June wildfires, after restricting 96 pages of the finished document solely to members of the victims' families.
- 4 December – Finance Minister Mário Centeno is elected as the next President of the Eurogroup. He is scheduled to take office in January 2018.
- 28 December – President Marcelo Rebelo de Sousa undergoes emergency surgery for an umbilical hernia at Lisbon's Curry Cabral Hospital. He is discharged three days later on 31 December ahead of his New Year's address to the nation the following day.

== Deaths ==
=== January to March ===
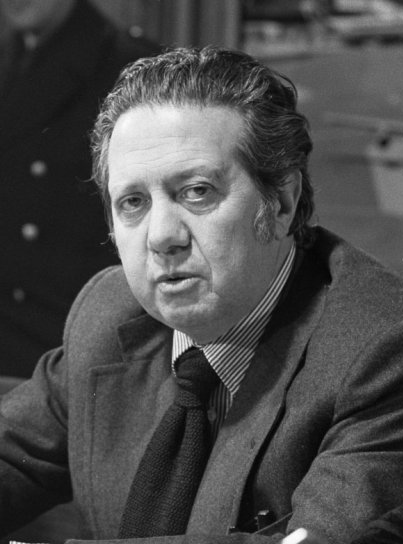
Mário Soares in 1975

- 1 January – Cláudio Panta Nunes, musician (born 1984).
- 2 January – Jacinto Durães, actor (born 1972).
- 3 January – Augusto Mascarenhas Barreto, historian and poet (born 1923).
- 7 January – Mário Soares, politician, President of Portugal (1986–1996) (born 1924).
- 10 February – Manuela Saraiva de Azevedo, journalist and writer (born 1905).
- 20 February – José Fernandes Fafe, diplomat and writer (born 1927).
- 2 March – Maria Velez, painter (born 1935).

=== April to June ===
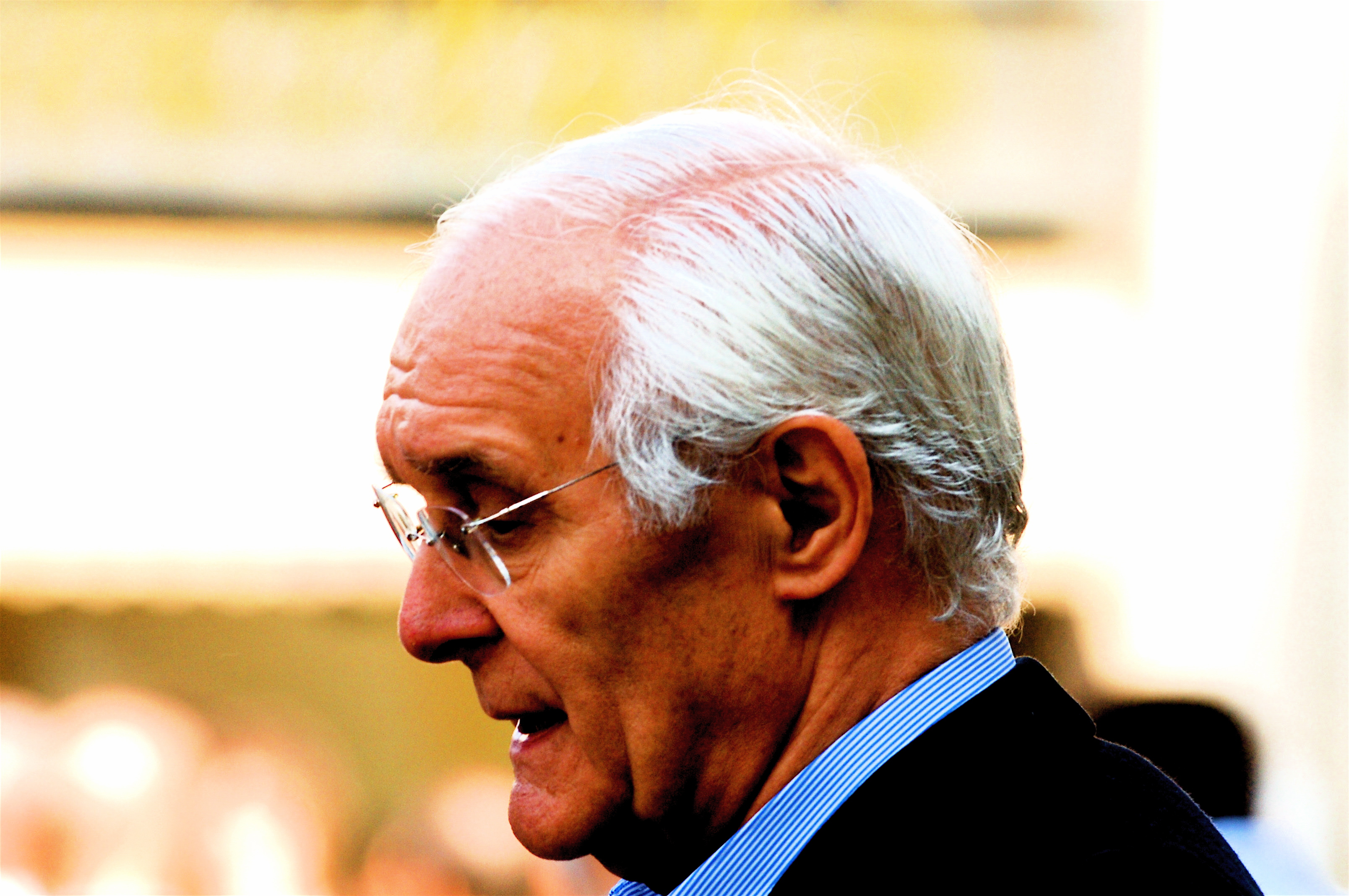
Armando Baptista-Bastos in 2006

- 13 April – Mário Contumélias, writer and poet (born 1948).
- 15 April – Alberto Carneiro, sculptor (born 1937).
- 28 April – Joaquim Carreira das Neves, theologist (born 1934).
- 9 May – Armando Baptista-Bastos, author and journalist (born 1934).
- 23 May – Manuel de Seabra, writer and translator (born 1932).
- 1 June – Armando da Silva Carvalho, poet (born 1938).
- 22 June – Miguel Beleza, economist and politician, Minister of Finance (1990–91) (born 1950).
- 25 June – José Manuel Mourinho Félix, football player and manager (born 1938).

=== July to September ===
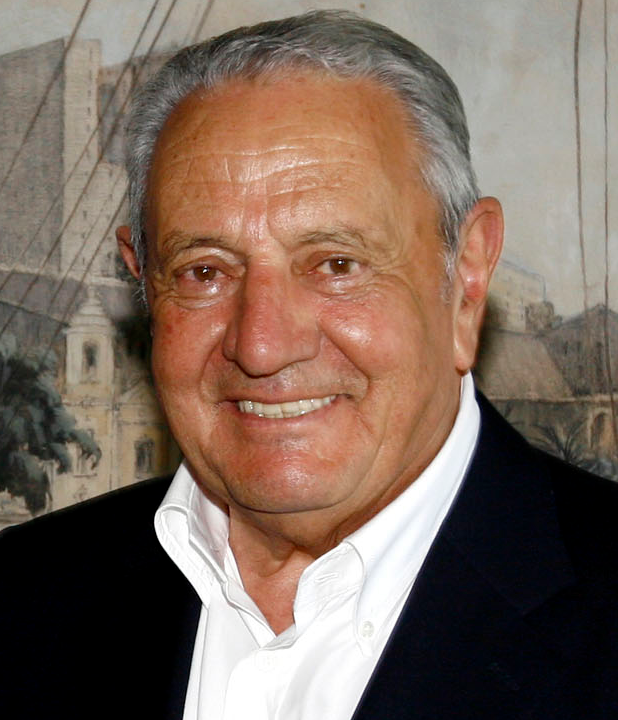
Américo Amorim in 2009

- 3 July – Henrique Medina Carreira, jurist and politician, Minister of Finance (1976–1978) (born 1931).
- 13 July – Américo Amorim, businessman (born 1934).
- 11 September – António Francisco dos Santos, Roman Catholic clergyman, Bishop of Porto (2014–2017) (born 1948).

=== October to December ===
- 1 October – José Pratas, football referee (born 1957).
- 5 October – António de Macedo, filmmaker and writer (born 1931).
- 7 November – João Hall Themido, diplomat, Ambassador to the United States (1971–1981) (born 1924).
- 24 November – Clotilde Rosa, harpist, composer, and music educator (born 1930).
- 29 November – Belmiro de Azevedo, businessman (born 1938).

== See also ==
- List of Portuguese films of 2017
