= 2020 in Portugal =

- Decades: 2000s; 2010s; 2020s; 2030s
- See also: History of Portugal; Timeline of Portuguese history; List of years in Portugal

Events in the year 2020 in Portugal.

== Incumbents ==
- President: Marcelo Rebelo de Sousa
- Prime Minister: António Costa (Socialist)

== Events by month ==
=== January ===
- 8 January – Police announce the seizure of 825 kilograms of cocaine, worth up to €30 million, hidden within a shipment of bananas from Latin America. It follows a similar case one year earlier when police had disrupted the trade of 430 kg of cocaine concealed in an identical manner.
- 14 January – The European Court of Human Rights orders the state to pay €13,000 in restitution to the family of Tiago Campos, a student who drowned with four others while participating in praxe activities in December 2013, after the Court deems that a number shortcomings in the subsequent criminal investigation constituted a violation of Article 2 of the European Convention on Human Rights.
- 28 January – André Ventura, leader of Chega, provokes an outcry in Parliament by saying that black Joacine Katar Moreira, a Guinea-Bissau-born Assembly member who wanted museum items from Portugal's former colonies to be returned, should be "sent back to her country of origin. It would be a lot better for everyone".

=== February ===
- 11 February – The government announces a freeze to the bank accounts of Isabel dos Santos, Africa's wealthiest woman and the daughter of the former Angolan president José Eduardo dos Santos, following a petition by the Angolan government. dos Santos is accused of embezzling $115 million from Angola's state-owned Sonangol company after the publication of leaked documents in January.
- 15 February – The General Confederation of the Portuguese Workers, the nation's largest trade union federation, elects Isabel Camarinha as its new general secretary. She is the first woman to lead the organisation in its 50-year history.
- 20 February – MPs in the Assembly of the Republic vote to legalise euthanasia.

=== March ===
- 2 March – The first case of COVID-19 in Portugal is detected.
- 8 March – Following a meeting with pupils whose school subsequently closes due to a case of COVID-19, President Marcelo Rebelo de Sousa cancels all public engagements and enters self-isolation.
- 10 March – The government suspends all flights between Portugal and Italy to contain the spread of COVID-19 following the implementation of a national quarantine in Italy.
- 12 March:
  - In a televised address, Prime Minister António Costa announces a series of national measures to limit COVID-19 transmission, including the closure of all schools and universities from 16 March, restricting the number of people allowed into shopping malls and restaurants, and limiting disembarkment from cruise ships to Portuguese nationals only. The measures are set to be reviewed on 9 April.
  - The Portuguese Football Federation confirms that all professional and amateur football in the country is to be suspended until further notice due to COVID-19. Other national sports competitions, such as volleyball and hockey, are similarly postponed.
- 16 March – The death of an 80-year-old man is confirmed by Health Minister Marta Temido as Portugal's first fatality from COVID-19.
- 18 March – In response to the COVID-19 pandemic, President Marcelo Rebelo de Sousa declares that a national state of emergency will take effect from the next day, with Finance Minister Mário Centeno unveiling €9.2 billion in economic assistance to households and companies. As of this day there have been 642 confirmed cases of COVID-19 with two deaths.
- 26 March:
  - The Bank of Portugal estimates that the economy will contract by between 3.7% and 5.7% of GDP in 2020 in light of the COVID-19 pandemic, with unemployment rising to between 10.1% and 11.7%.
  - Anthropologists reveal evidence of extensive seafood gathering by Neanderthals in a cave on the Portuguese coast, suggesting a closer relationship between the behaviours and diets of Neanderthals and modern humans than previously thought.
- 29 March – Eduardo Cabrita, the Minister for Home Affairs, announces that migrants with active citizenship applications will be granted full citizenship rights until July. The move guarantees access to healthcare and social security benefits to all Portuguese residents during the COVID-19 pandemic.

=== April ===
- 2 April – MPs vote in favour of extending the national state of emergency for another fifteen days.
- 4 April – Government figures indicate that more than 500,000 workers are in danger of temporarily losing their jobs due to the COVID-19 pandemic, after almost 32,000 businesses apply to the government to furlough employees. The day also sees the total number of COVID-19 cases surpass 10,000, with 10,524 cases and 266 deaths reported.
- 8 April – The Minister for Home Affairs Eduardo Cabrita criticises the "gross negligence and serious cover-up" within the Foreigners and Borders Service (Serviço de Estrangeiros e Fronteiras, SEF) following the death of Ukrainian national Ihor Homenyuk in a detention centre at Lisbon Airport on 12 March, and announces a series of procedural changes at the centre to increase transparency in future cases.
- 12 April – Reuters reports that one in every eight of Portugal's 504 deaths from COVID-19 to date have occurred in care homes, with officials expressing concern about the spread of the coronavirus among the elderly residents. As of this day there have been 16,585 recorded cases in the country.
- 14 April – The International Monetary Fund forecasts an 8.0% drop in Portuguese GDP for 2020 as a consequence of the COVID-19 pandemic, with unemployment predicted to rise to 13.9%. The economy is forecast to recover in 2021 with unemployment falling to 8.7%.
- 16 April – MPs vote to further extend the national state of emergency until the beginning of May. The vote comes amid a declining growth in infections, prompting the Health Secretary António Sales to praise the "excellent behaviour and civic-mindedness of the Portuguese people". The number of confirmed cases of COVID-19 to date stands at 18,841 with 629 deaths.
- 25 April – The anniversary of the Carnation Revolution is observed for the first time without public celebrations in light of national COVID-19 restrictions, though the Assembly continues to mark the occasion with a reduced attendance of MPs and guests.
- 28 April – President Marcelo Rebelo de Sousa announces that the national state of emergency in place since 18 March will begin to be lifted from 3 May.
- 30 April – The Automóvel Club de Portugal confirms the cancellation of the 2020 Rally de Portugal due to the COVID-19 pandemic, abandoning plans to reschedule the event's planned 21–24 May date to October.

=== May ===
- 1 May – The Directorate-General of Health confirms that the number of fatalities from COVID-19 in Portugal has surpassed 1,000, with eighteen deaths in the preceding 24 hours bringing the country's total to 1,007. As of this date there have been 25,531 recorded cases and 1,647 recoveries.
- 3 May – The national state of emergency is lifted after six weeks, with the country downgraded to the lesser "state of calamity".
- 4 May – A three-phase re-opening plan for the country begins with small retail businesses allowed to open and the Lisbon and Porto Metro systems resuming at a reduced capacity. The use of face masks is made compulsory for those using public transport and visiting enclosed public premises such as supermarkets.
- 9 May – Organisers of the Vuelta a España announce that the two stages of the 2020 race set to take place in Portugal will not go ahead.
- 20 May – Data from the Institute for Employment and Vocational Training reveals that the number of people registering as unemployed across the country increased by 48,500 in April, a rise of 22% compared to April 2019. The total number of people out of work now stands at approximately 392,000.

=== June ===
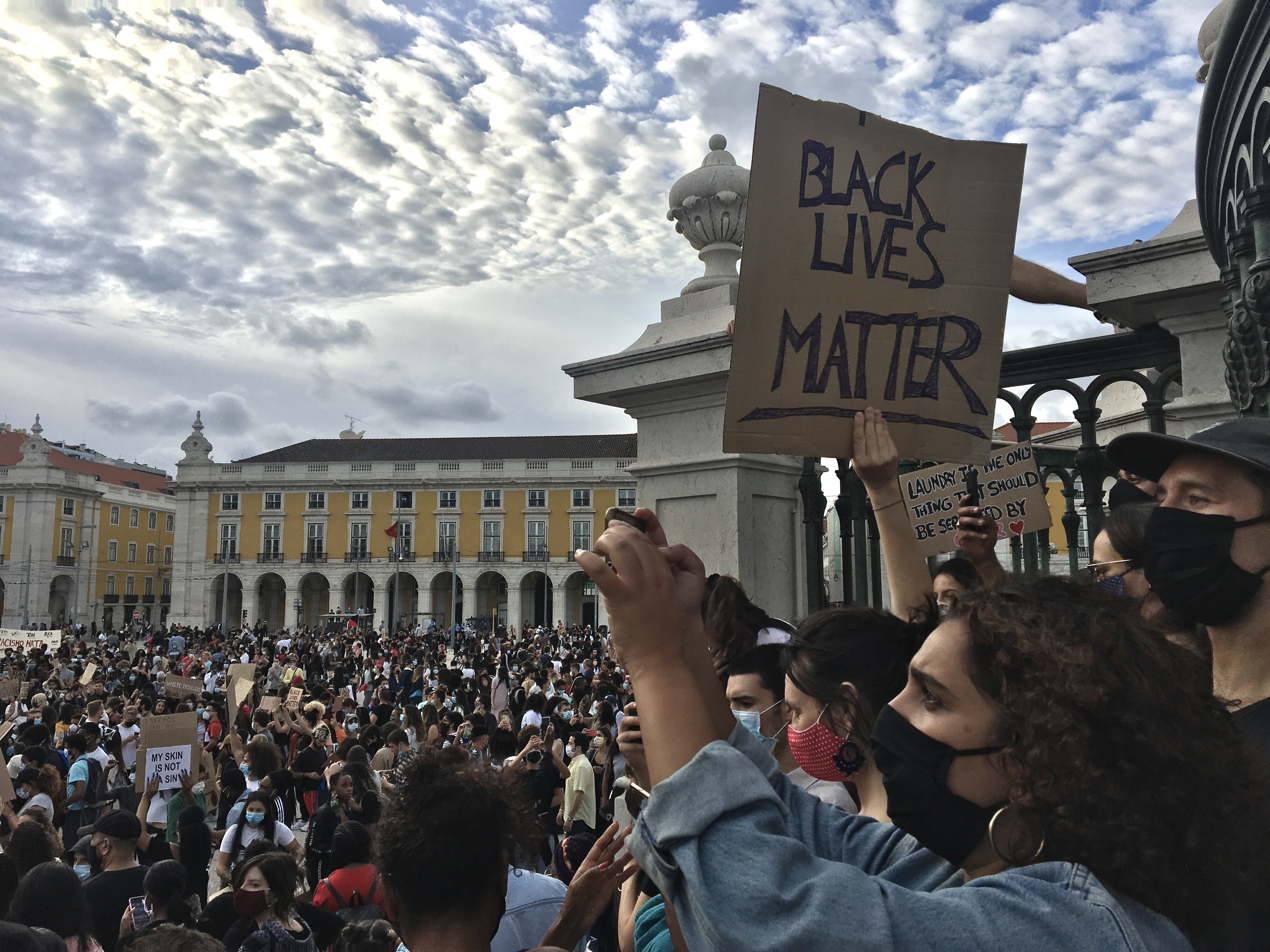
6 June: Thousands attend a Black Lives Matter protest in Lisbon

- 1 June – The government reveals a four-fold increase to €108 million to the total funds made available to companies shifting production towards tackling the COVID-19 pandemic. As of this date there have been 32,700 cases and 1,424 deaths from COVID-19 recorded in the country.
- 3 June – The Primeira Liga resumes competition, with all remaining matches of the 2019–20 season taking place without spectators.
- 6 June – Thousands attend anti-racism protests in Lisbon and Porto in response to the murder of George Floyd in the United States on 25 May.
- 9 June:
  - Finance Minister Mário Centeno announces his resignation from the government for reasons undisclosed. João Leão, the current Budget Minister, is confirmed by Prime Minister António Costa as Centeno's replacement beginning on 15 June.
  - The Assembly officially recognises diplomat Aristides de Sousa Mendes, who in his capacity as consul to France in June 1940 issued thousands of visas to Jewish refugees in Bordeaux, allowing them to escape the advancing German army by crossing south into neutral Spain. In recognition of his actions, a monument dedicated to him within the National Pantheon is also planned.
- 10 June – The European Commission approves a €1.2 billion loan from the government to TAP Air, the nation's flag carrier airline, whose debt at the end of 2019 amounted to €800 million.
- 25 June:
  - Prime Minister António Costa announces that the country will exit the "state of calamity" introduced on 3 May and enter the lesser "state of alert" from 1 July.
  - A rise in the recorded number of cases of COVID-19 in Lisbon prompts the government to re-impose certain restrictions in nineteen of the capital's parishes to stem transmissions. From 1 July, measures such as restrictions on travel, an 8pm curfew for businesses, and limiting the size of social gatherings to five people will be enforced.
- 27 June: Chega party organizes a counter-protest to the one held on 6 June, entitled "Portugal is not racist", where party leader André Ventura says that there is no structural racism in Portugal, and that the political left uses racism as a pretext to foment political agendas.

=== July ===
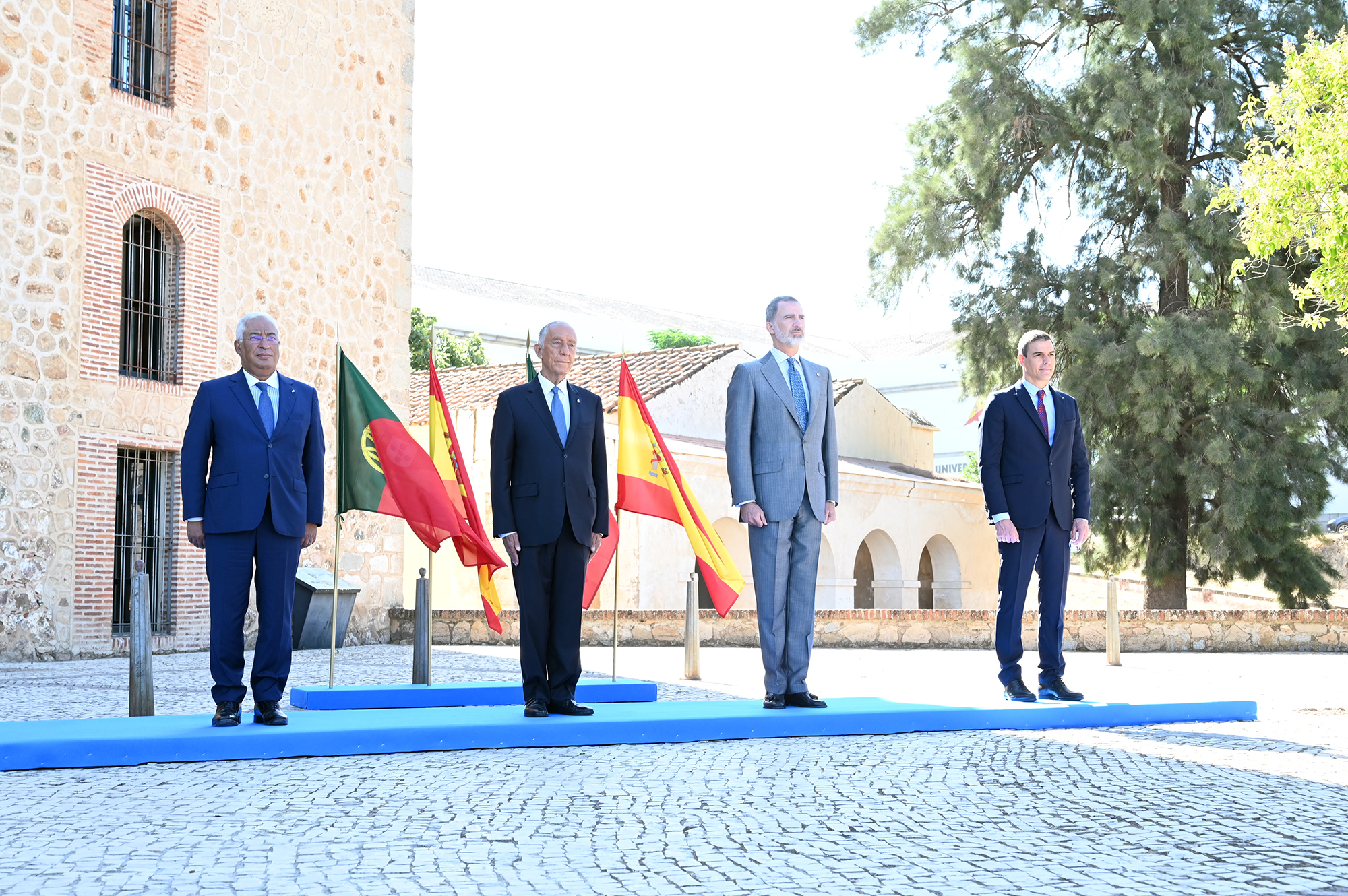
1 July: António Costa, Marcelo Rebelo de Sousa, Felipe VI, and Pedro Sánchez attend the border re-opening ceremony

- 1 July – After being shut for more than three months due to the COVID-19 pandemic, the Spanish-Portuguese border is formally re-opened in a ceremony attended by President Marcelo Rebelo de Sousa, Prime Minister António Costa, King Felipe VI, and Spanish Prime Minister Pedro Sánchez.
- 3 July – Foreign Minister Augusto Santos Silva attacks the "profoundly unfair and wrong" decision to exclude Portugal from the United Kingdom's list of countries that English tourists could visit without needing to self-quarantine on their return. Visitors from the United Kingdom constitute approximately 20% of all international tourists to Portugal.
- 15 July – FC Porto win the 2019–20 Primeira Liga after securing an unassailable points lead over title rivals S.L. Benfica with two games remaining. It is the club's 29th championship title.
- 28 July – The Government of Madeira announces that from 1 August the use of face masks will become compulsory in both indoor and outdoor public areas for all those over the age of 10. As of this date the island has recorded 105 cases of COVID-19, eight of which are listed by the government as active cases.
- 29 July – Data from the Instituto Nacional de Estatística (INE) reveals that the national unemployment rate rose to 7.0% in June as a result of the COVID-19 pandemic and the associated lockdown, with an estimated 180,000 jobs lost since February. The figures also show a rise in the youth unemployment rate to 25.6%.
- 31 July – An Alfa Pendular train carrying 240 passengers derails following a collision with a maintenance vehicle in the town of Soure, killing two and injuring more than 30.

=== August ===
- 3 August – Health Secretary António Sales confirms that zero deaths from COVID-19 were recorded over the preceding 24 hours across Portugal for the first time since mid-March. As of this date there have been 51,569 national cases of COVID-19 and 1,738 deaths.
- 12–23 August – The final three rounds of the 2019–20 UEFA Champions League are played at the Estádio José Alvalade and Estádio da Luz in Lisbon following a rescheduling of the competition in light of the COVID-19 pandemic. The final, which is played on 23 August behind closed doors at Estádio da Luz, sees Bayern Munich defeat Paris St. Germain 1–0 to win their sixth European title.
- 13 August – Archaeologists announce the discovery of the foundations of a wooden Neolithic structure at the Perdigões Archaeological Complex in the Évora District. The site is the first of its kind to have been unearthed in Iberia and is thought to date back some 5,500 years.
- 31 August – A report published by the INE outlining the second quarter economic impact of the COVID-19 pandemic shows a year-on-year drop of 40% in the exports of goods and services between April and June. The report also shows a decline of 56% in the tourism-dominated services sector, with the month of June alone seeing international visitors to the country fall by 96% compared to twelve months earlier.

=== September ===
- 3 September – Six Portuguese activists aged between 12 and 21 bring the first climate change case to the European Court of Human Rights in an attempt to legally bind thirty-three countries to pledges made in the 2015 Paris Agreement to reduce greenhouse gas emissions.
- 5 September – A total of 486 new cases of COVID-19 are recorded across Portugal, the highest national daily rise in four months. As of this date there have been 59,943 reported cases of COVID-19 and 1,838 deaths.
- 13 September – Five firefighters are injured and more than 20 residents are evacuated after a wildfire breaks out near Proença-a-Nova in the Castelo Branco District. By the following day, nearly 1,000 firefighters and fifteen aircraft are sent to control the blaze.

=== October ===
- 11 October – Manuel Heitor, the Minister for Science, Technology and Higher Education, tests positive for COVID-19 and enters self-isolation. It is the first known case of COVID-19 within the government.
- 13 October – Approximately 4,000 worshippers attend the annual pilgrimage to the Sanctuary of Fátima in Cova da Iria in a reduced ceremony commemorating the Miracle of the Sun in 1917. Following large numbers of visitors to the site in the preceding month, restrictions on capacity are introduced to limit COVID-19 transmission, cutting attendance from the 300,000 observed in previous years to a maximum of 6,000.
- 14 October – The government re-introduces a national "state of calamity" amid rising COVID-19 infection rates, and announces plans for new laws to reduce the size of gatherings to five people, broaden the mandatory use of face masks in outdoor settings, and increase the maximum fines applied to businesses who breach COVID-19 restrictions to €10,000. The day also sees 2,072 new reported cases of COVID-19, the highest daily number recorded nationally since the beginning of the pandemic.
- 25 October:
  - Azorean regional election: The Socialist Party remains the largest party in the Legislative Assembly but loses its majority for the first time in 20 years, winning 25 of the Assembly's 57 seats against the Social Democratic Party's 21 seats. Turnout increases from the previous election to 45%.
  - Lewis Hamilton wins the 2020 Portuguese Grand Prix held at the Algarve International Circuit, the first Formula One motor race to take place in the country since 1996.
- 31 October – Prime Minister António Costa announces tighter COVID-19 restrictions to stem transmission rates in 121 municipalities nationwide. The new rules, which will come into effect on 4 November and affect approximately seven million residents, will only allow residents to leave home for shopping, employment, and education purposes.

=== November ===
- 2 November – A day of national mourning is held to commemorate those who have died of COVID-19, which as of this date stands at 2,544. A ceremony is held at Belém Palace where a minute's silence is observed and flags are flown at half-mast.
- 6 November – MPs approve President Marcelo Rebelo de Sousa's decree from the previous day for the nation to re-enter a state of emergency for fifteen days beginning 9 November. It is the fourth time this year that such a measure has been ratified due to the number of COVID-19 cases in the country.
- 8 November – A curfew extending from 11pm to 5am on weekdays and 1pm to 5am on weekends is announced by Prime Minister António Costa for the 121 municipalities already under extended restrictions since 4 November. The measure will come into force the following day.
- 22 November – Miguel Oliveira wins the 2020 Portuguese motorcycle Grand Prix held at the Algarve International Circuit.

=== December ===
- 3 December – The government outlines its proposals to vaccinate one million residents against COVID-19 in the first four months of 2021. Those most clinically vulnerable to the virus over the age 50, frontline and emergency healthcare workers, and residents and staff of care homes are listed as the priority groups that will be the first to receive the vaccine.
- 7 December – President Marcelo Rebelo de Sousa announces his bid for a second term in office ahead of the presidential election in January 2021. An opinion poll by Aximage suggests that Rebelo de Sousa will win re-election by a wide margin ahead of his closest rivals, the former MEP Ana Gomes and the far-right Chega leader Andre Ventura.
- 11 December – The government announces a rescue package worth more than €3 billion for the national air carrier TAP Air Portugal, which suffered losses of more than €700 million from January to September due to restrictions imposed by the COVID-19 pandemic. The deal, which is subject to approval by the European Commission, will see more than 3,500 jobs cut, wages reduced by 25%, and a decrease in the number of planes in the carrier's fleet.
- 15 December – Social Democratic MPs call for the resignation of Eduardo Cabrita, the Minister for Home Affairs, over his response to the death of Ukrainian national Ihor Homenyuk at the hands of SEF border officials on 12 March. The calls come one week after Cabrita announced that the head of the SEF would leave his post in a reorganisation of the service.
- 19 December – Prime Minister António Costa enters self-isolation after French President Emmanuel Macron, with whom Costa met three days earlier on 16 December, tests positive for COVID-19.

== Ongoing events ==
- COVID-19 pandemic in Portugal
- Sanlúcar de Barrameda 2019–2022 – A series of events held in Spain and Portugal between 2019 and 2022 commemorating the 500th anniversary of the first circumnavigation of the globe by Ferdinand Magellan and Juan Sebastián Elcano.

== Deaths ==
=== January to March ===
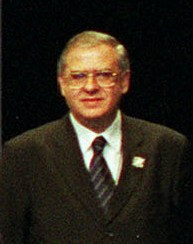
Júlio Castro Caldas

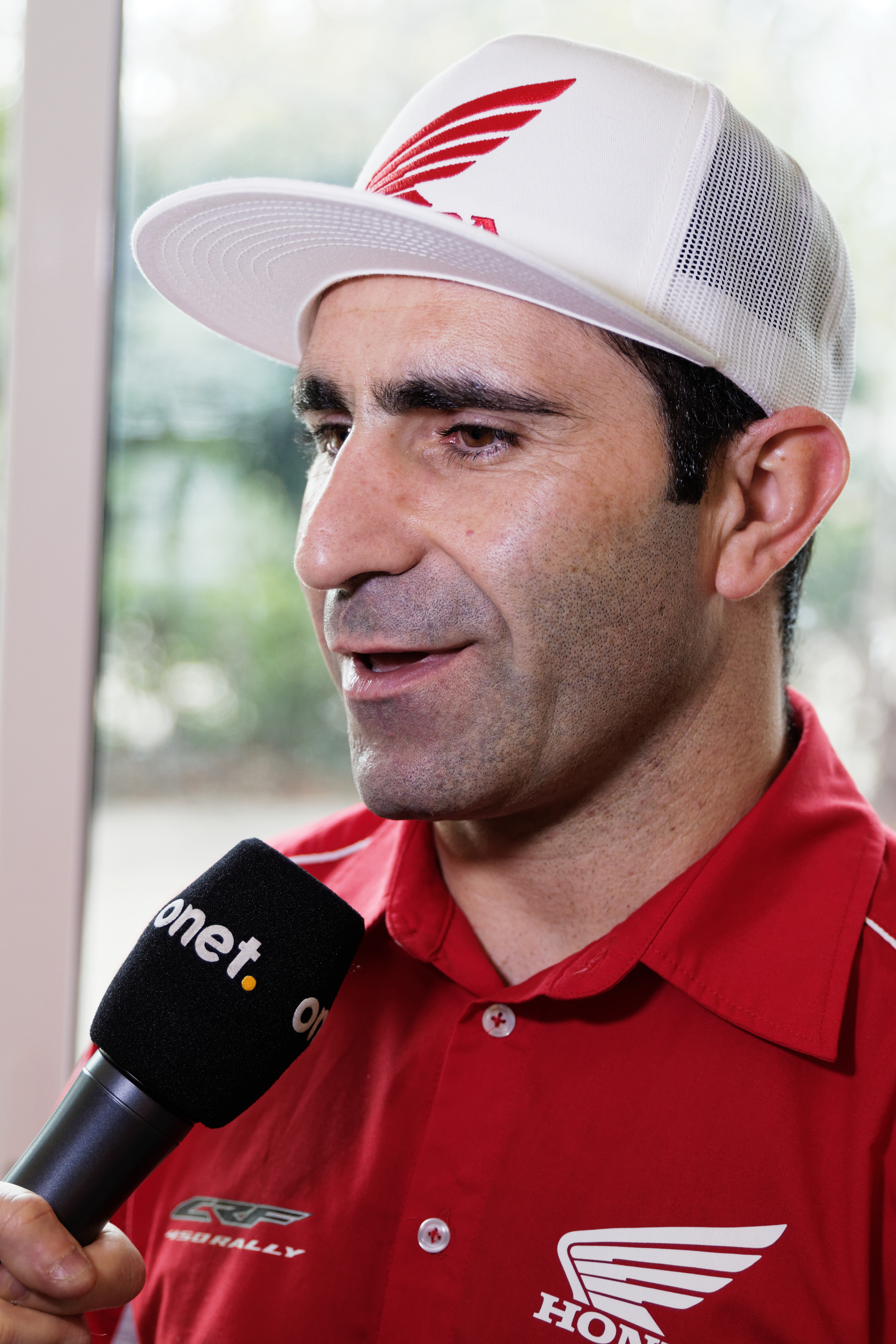
Paulo Gonçalves in 2015

- 4 January – Júlio Castro Caldas, lawyer and politician (born 1943).
- 11 January – Fernanda Pires da Silva, businesswoman (born 1926).
- 12 January – Paulo Gonçalves, motorcycle rally driver (born 1979).
- 10 February – Álvaro Barreto, politician (born 1936).
- 20 February – Joaquim Pina Moura, politician and economist, Minister of Economy and Treasury (1997–2001) (born 1952).
- 21 February – Ilídio Pinto Leandro, Roman Catholic clergyman, Bishop of Viseu (2006–2018) (born 1950).
- 12 March – Francisco Romãozinho, rally driver (born 1943).

=== April to June ===
- 14 April – Maria de Sousa, immunologist (born 1939).
- 17 May – José Cutileiro, diplomat and writer (born 1934).
- 23 May – Maria Velho da Costa, writer (born 1938).
- 8 June – Tavares Moreira, economist, governor of the Bank of Portugal (1986–1992) (born 1944).
- 10 June – Maria José, actress (born 1927).
- 20 June - Pedro Lima, actor (born 1971).

=== July to September ===
- 4 July – Arsénio Rodrigues Jardim, footballer (born 1949).
- 28 July – Eugénio Eleutério, Olympic sprinter (1952) (born 1920).
- 6 August – Fernanda Lapa, actress (born 1943).
- 17 August – Mário de Araújo Cabral, racing driver (born 1934).
- 3 September – Eduardo Cameselle Mendez, football player and manager (born 1962).
- 21 September – Jaime Alves, footballer (born 1965).

=== October to December ===
- 11 October - Ângelo Martins, footballer (born 1930).
- 19 October – Helena Marques, writer and journalist (born 1935).
- 30 October – Kalidás Barreto, trade unionist, co-founder of the General Confederation of the Portuguese Workers (born 1932).
- 8 November – Cruzeiro Seixas, painter and poet (born 1920).
- 11 November – Gonçalo Ribeiro Telles, architect and politician (born 1922).
- 24 November – José de Bastos, football player and manager (born 1929).
- 1 December – Eduardo Lourenço, philosopher and writer (born 1923).
