= 2016 in Portugal =

- Decades: 1990s; 2000s; 2010s; 2020s; 2030s
- See also: History of Portugal; Timeline of Portuguese history; List of years in Portugal

The following lists events during 2016 in Portugal.

== Incumbents ==
- President: Aníbal Cavaco Silva (until 9 March); Marcelo Rebelo de Sousa (from 9 March)
- Prime Minister: António Costa (Socialist)

== Events ==
=== January to March ===
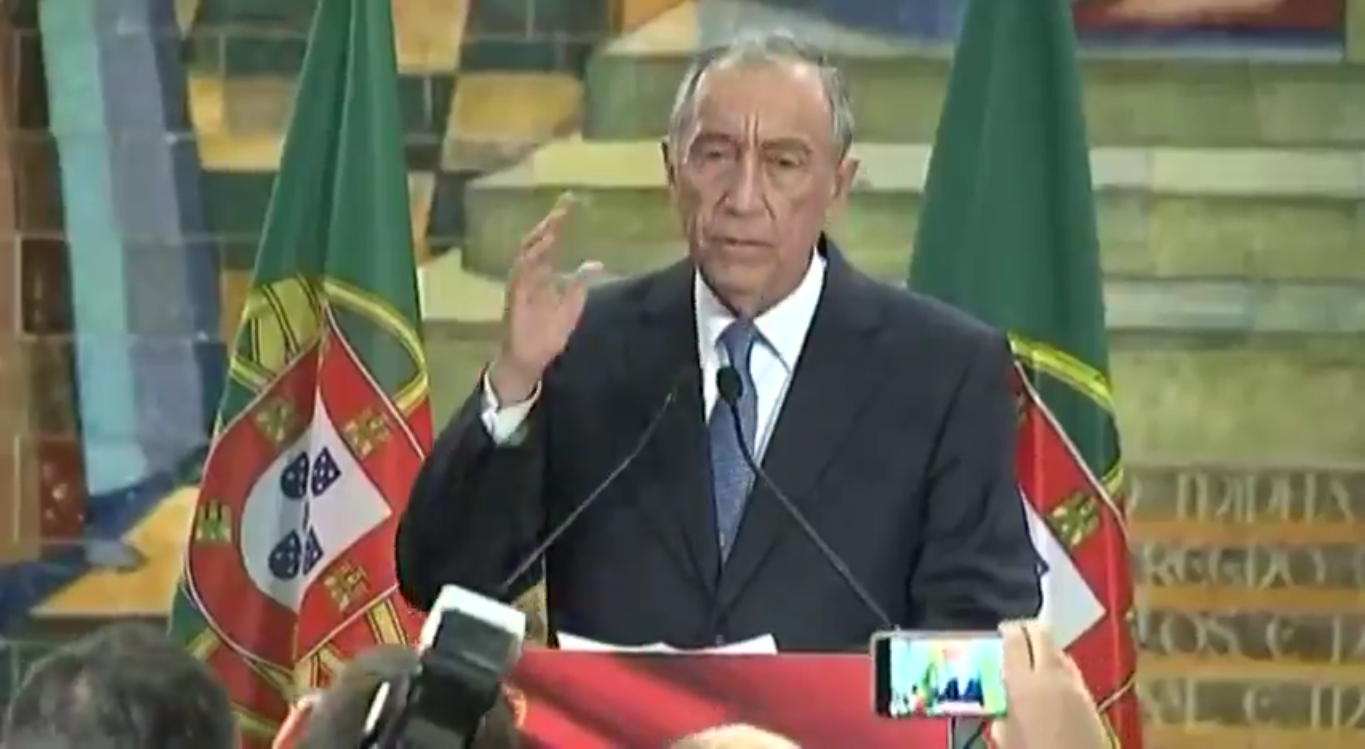
24 January: Marcelo Rebelo de Sousa speaks after his victory in the 2016 presidential election

- 24 January – Presidential election: Marcelo Rebelo de Sousa is elected as President after securing 52.4% of the vote in the first round, a majority that removes the need for a second round. Turnout rises slightly from the last election to 49%.
- 27 January – The National Health Institute confirms that there are five positive cases of the Zika virus in Portugal. Described as "mild" with no need for hospitalisation, each case was imported from Brazil where an outbreak of the virus has been reported.
- 10 February – President Anibal Cavaco Silva's veto against a measure allowing same-sex couples to adopt is overridden by MPs in the Assembly of the Republic. The measure, which was passed by MPs in November 2014, will be signed into law within eight days as per the constitution.
- 12–14 February – Severe weather across areas of northern and central Portugal leads to flooding which claims the life of one person in the town of Albergaria-a-Velha in the Aveiro District. Transport links are also affected as the Águeda, Mondego, and Vouga rivers burst their banks and localised landslides and damage to trees occur.
- 16 February – Figures from the Instituto Nacional de Estatística reveals that the number of foreign tourists visiting Portugal in 2015 topped 10 million for the first time, a rise of 10% over 2014. The number of domestic tourists also grew by more than 7%, contributing to a growth of more than 13% in the hospitality industry for the year. The travel and tourism sector is worth approximately 10% of Portugal's gross domestic product.
- 9 March – Marcelo Rebelo de Sousa is sworn in as the 20th President of Portugal.

=== April to June ===
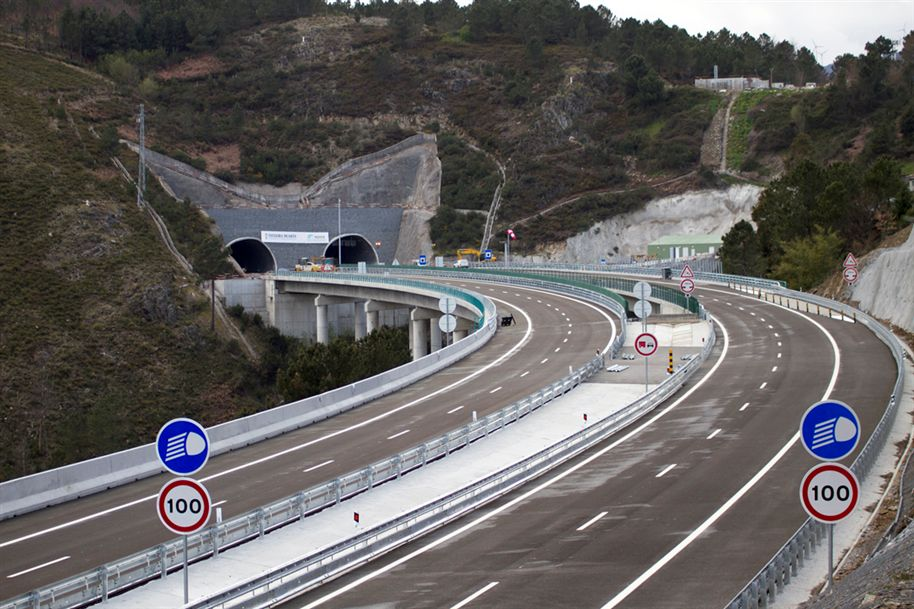
7 May: The Marão Tunnel in the Vila Real District opens four years after originally scheduled.

- 4 May – Infraestruturas de Portugal states it plans to press charges against a 24-year-old man who dislodged and damaged a 126-year old statue of King Sebastian at Lisbon's Rossio railway station after climbing upon it to take a selfie photograph.
- 5 May – Figures released by Eurostat show that national emissions of carbon dioxide rose by 8.6% in 2015, the second highest increase among European Union (EU) member states. As a signatory to the 2015 Paris Climate Accords, the EU is committed to reducing greenhouse gas emissions, the main cause of anthropogenic climate change.
- 7 May – The Marão Tunnel in the Vila Real District is officially opened by Prime Minister António Costa. Constructed at a cost of €137 million and delayed from its planned opening date of 2012 due to various financial and legal obstacles, the 5.7-kilometre (3.5 mi) tunnel is the longest of its kind on the Iberian peninsula.
- 15 May – In association football, S.L. Benfica win the 2015–16 Primeira Liga after a 4–1 victory over C.D. Nacional, finishing two points clear of title rivals Sporting CP to claim the club's 35th championship title.
- 22 May:
  - In motor racing, Great Britain's Kris Meeke wins the 2016 Rally de Portugal.
  - In association football, Sporting Braga defeat F.C. Porto in a penalty shoot-out to win the 2015–16 Taça de Portugal for the first time in fifty years.
- 24 May – Frederico Carvalhão, a spy for the Portugal's intelligence service, is arrested in Rome after being accused of sharing classified information about NATO and the European Union with a Russian intelligence officer.
- 7 June – The longest case of womb survival in a brain dead mother in Portugal is recorded after the birth of a boy in Lisbon's São José Hospital to a woman whose brain activity ceased on 20 February.

=== July to September ===
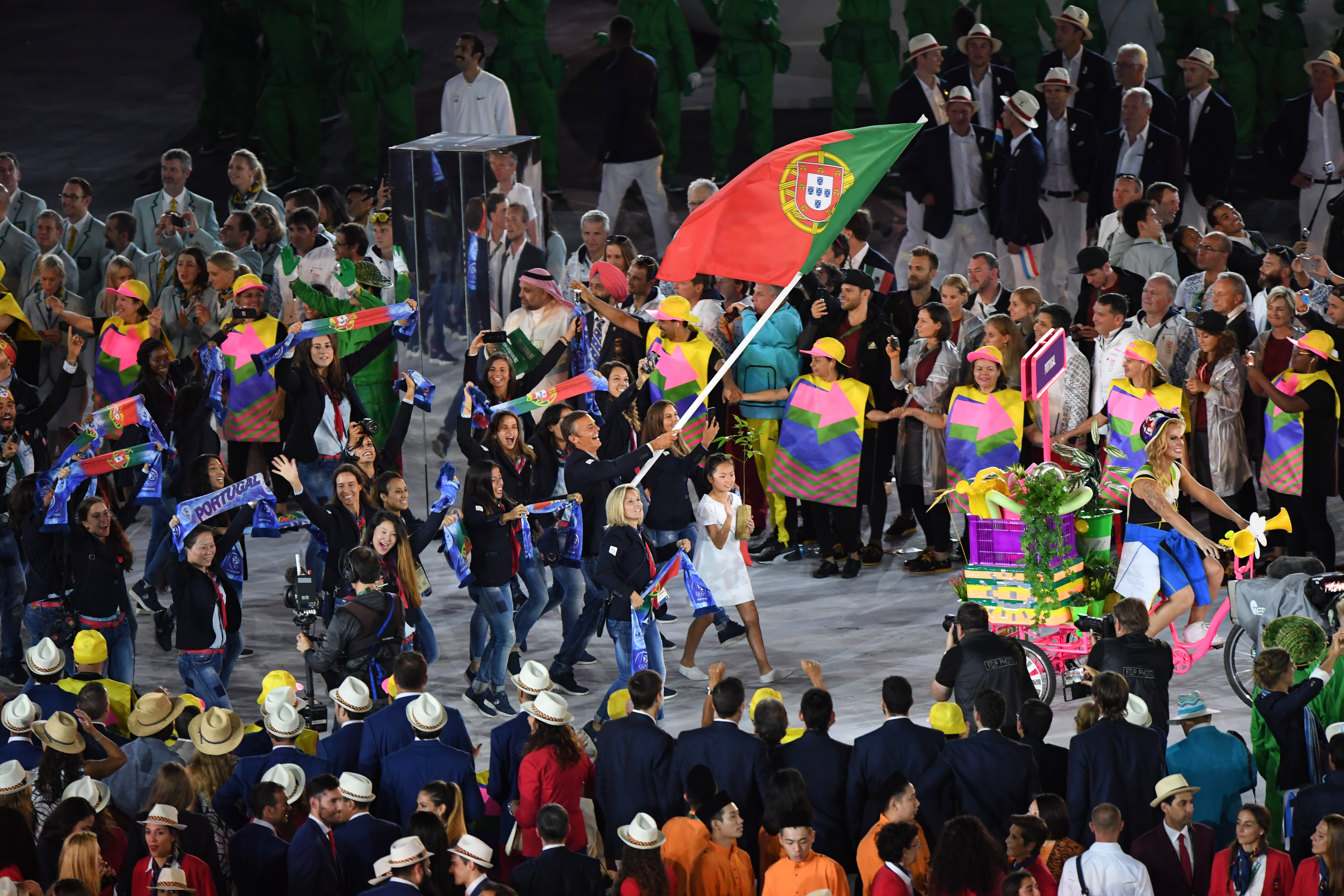
5 August: Portuguese Olympians during the opening ceremony of the 2016 Summer Olympics

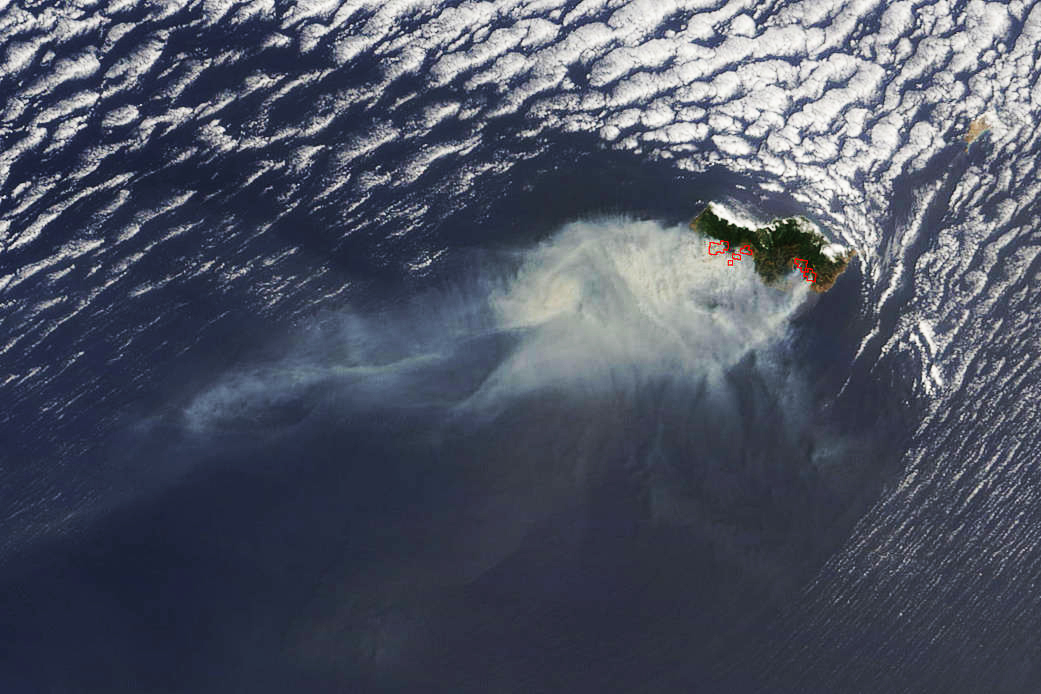
10 August: Smoke from Madeira's wildfires as seen from space

- 10 July – In association football, the Portuguese national team defeat France by a score 1–0 in the final of UEFA Euro 2016 to win the country's first major international football competition.
- 5–11 August – A series of wildfires break out across Madeira and the Portuguese mainland after a spell of temperatures above 35°C. On 10 August the National Authority for Civil Protection announces that more than 4,000 emergency workers were attending 176 active fires across Portuguese territory, one of which was threatening the Madeiran capital of Funchal. The day also sees the confirmation of four deaths with three in Madeira and one on the mainland. On 11 August The New York Times reports that approximately 150 homes in Funchal have been destroyed by fire, forcing the evacuation of at least 1,000 people to temporary shelter.
- 5–21 August – Portugal competes in the 2016 Summer Olympics in Rio de Janeiro with 92 athletes contesting in 16 sports. Telma Monteiro wins the country's sole medal with bronze in the women's 57 kg judo.
- 7 August – In cycling, Rui Vinhas wins the 2016 Volta a Portugal in a time of 40 hours, 56 minutes, and 57 seconds. He is the first Portuguese victor of the event since 2011.
- 9 August – The European Union declines to financially penalise the Portuguese government for failing to abide by national deficit limits in 2015, citing "exceptional circumstances". The government is given until the end of the year to bring its deficit down from 4.4% of gross domestic product to 2.5%.
- 23 August – The government and the European Commission agree in principle to a €2.7 billion injection of cash for the struggling Caixa Geral de Depositos bank, which reported a loss of more than €200 million in the first six months of the year.
- 27 September – Prime Minister António Costa announces that a series of artworks by Spanish painter Joan Miró under public ownership will remain in the country after plans to sell the collection in 2014 were shelved due to public criticism.

=== October to December ===
- 14 October:
  - Former Prime Minister António Guterres is appointed the Secretary-General of the United Nations. He will formally take office and succeed the incumbent Ban Ki-moon on 1 January 2017.
  - The government unveils a bill to introduce a sugar tax on carbonated beverages in 2017, with drinks exceeding 80g of sugar per litre levied at €16.46 per 100 litres. The move is predicted to raise €80m for the National Health Service.
- 16 October – Azorean regional election: The Socialist Party maintains its majority in the Legislative Assembly, albeit with one fewer seat and a smaller share of the popular vote, with the opposition Social Democrats also losing one seat in the face of gains by the CDS – People's Party and the Left Bloc. Turnout falls to 40.9%, the lowest ever recorded in the region.
- 8 November – Twenty members of a Neo-Nazi group are arrested by police across the country on charges including attempted murder and theft carried out between 2013 and 2015.

== Deaths ==
=== January to March ===
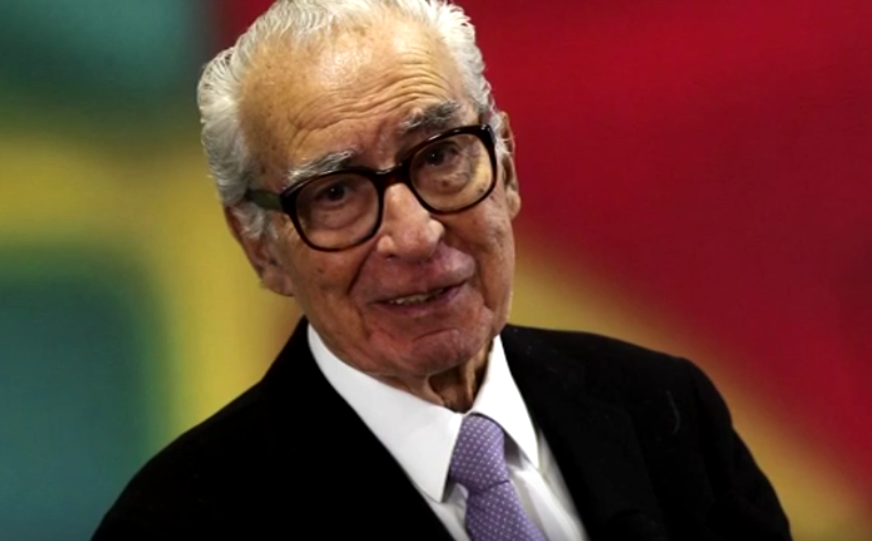
António de Almeida Santos

- 18 January – António de Almeida Santos, lawyer and politician (born 1926).
- 26 January – José Boavida, actor (born 1964).
- 23 February – Jaime Ornelas Camacho, politician, President of the Regional Government of Madeira (1976–1978) (born 1921).
- 24 February – Ernesto Oliveira, footballer (born 1921).
- 29 February – Ana Vieira, artist (born 1940).
- 2 March – Noémia Delgado, television and film director (born 1933).
- 11 March – Vasco Nunes, cinematographer (born 1974).
- 14 March – Nicolau Breyner, actor (born 1940).
- 31 March – Fernando Mendes, footballer (born 1937).

=== April to June ===
- 12 April – Francisco Nicholson, actor and screenwriter (born 1938).
- 28 May – Vicente da Câmara, fado singer (born 1928).

=== July to September ===
- 2 July – Camilo de Oliveira, actor (born 1924).
- 25 July – Artur Correia, footballer (born 1950).
- 31 July – Mário Moniz Pereira, athletic coach (born 1921).
- 25 August – Maria Eugénia, actress (born 1927).
- 31 August – Anna Paula, actress (born 1929).
- 3 September – Maria Isabel Barreno, writer (born 1939).
- 7 September – António Barbosa de Melo, politician, President of the Assembly of the Republic (1991–1995) (born 1932).
- 12 September – Arquimínio Rodrigues da Costa, Roman Catholic prelate, Bishop of Macau (1976–1988) (born 1924).

=== October to December ===
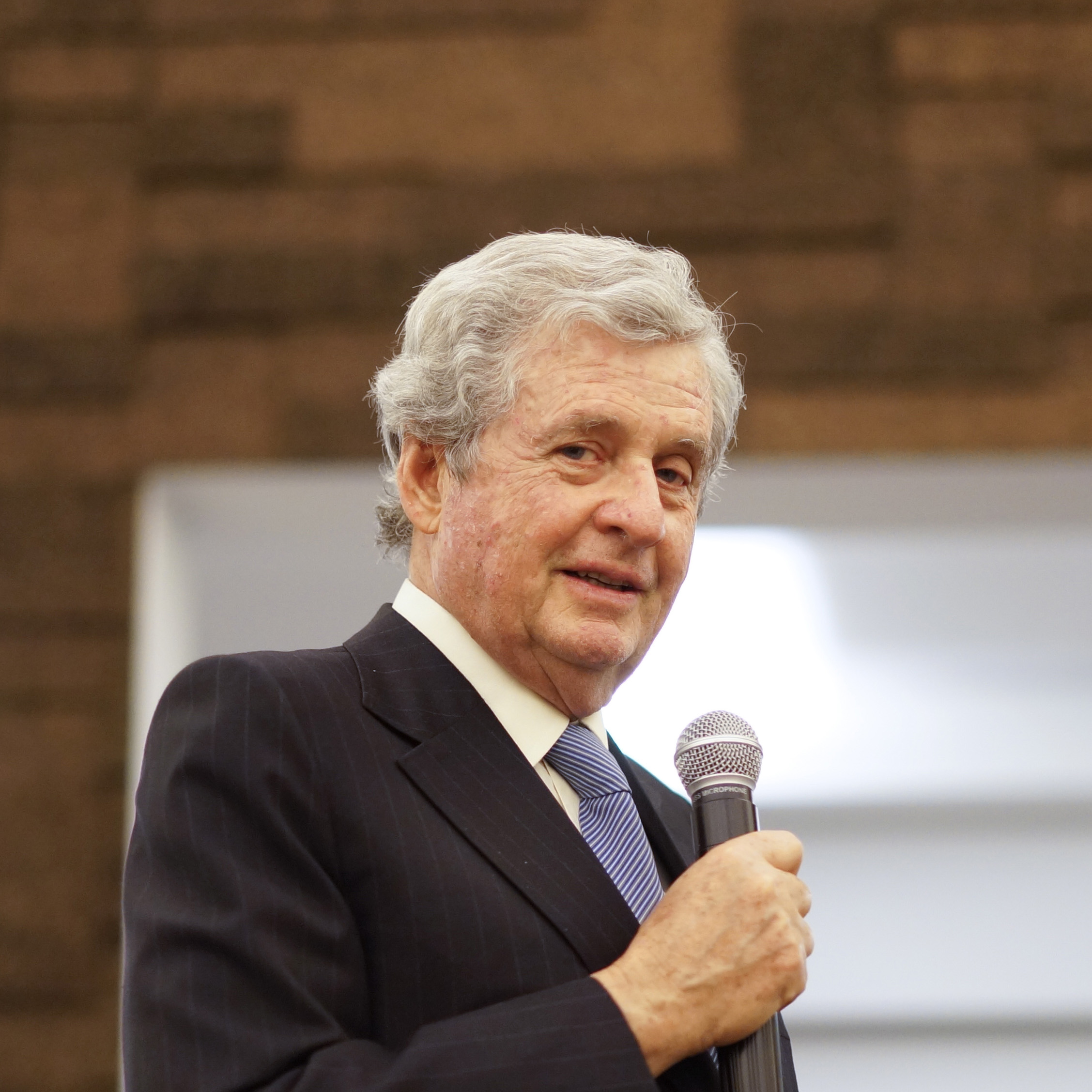
João Lobo Antunes in 2014

- 3 October – Mário Wilson, footballer (b. 1929).
- 14 October – José Lello, politician (b. 1944).
- 27 October – João Lobo Antunes, neurosurgeon (b. 1944).
- 27 October – Jaime Fernandes, radio broadcaster (b. 1947).
- 11 November – Alfredo Bruto da Costa, politician (b. 1938).
- 27 November – Carlos Santos, actor (b. 1937)
- 10 December – Alberto Seixas Santos, film director (b. 1936).
- 11 December – Manuel Bola, actor (b. 1944).
- 22 December – Luís de Azevedo Coutinho, politician (b. 1928)
- 25 December – José Silva Marques, politician (b. 1938).

== See also ==
- List of Portuguese films of 2016
