= 2018 in Portugal =

- Decades: 1990s; 2000s; 2010s; 2020s; 2030s
- See also: History of Portugal; Timeline of Portuguese history; List of years in Portugal

Events in the year 2018 in Portugal.

== Incumbents ==
- President: Marcelo Rebelo de Sousa
- Prime Minister: António Costa (Socialist)

== Events ==
=== January ===
15 January: A magnitude 4.9 earthquake felt across large areas of Portugal was centered in Arraiolos (in red)

- 14 January:
  - Eight people are killed and a further 35 are injured in a fire at a community centre in the town of Vila Nova da Rainha in Tondela.
  - Rui Rio is elected as the leader of the Social Democratic Party with 54% of the party members' vote, defeating rival candidate and former Prime Minister Pedro Santana Lopes.
  - The Instituto Nacional de Estatística estimates that the country's GDP growth in 2017 was 2.7%, the highest annual increase since 2000.
- 15 January – An earthquake with a local magnitude of 4.9 occurs in Arraiolos in the Évora District. Although widely felt across central and southern Portugal, no damage or injuries are reported.
- 24 January – Prime Minister António Costa announces that Google will open a support centre in Oeiras for its European, African, and Middle Eastern regions later in the year, a move that is expected to create 500 high-skilled technology jobs.
- 29 January – A 67-year-old man is shot and killed at a school in Nazaré following a dispute between the family members of two students.

=== February ===
- 1 February – The largest in a series of aftershocks from the 15 January earthquake occurs in Arraiolos with a local magnitude of 3.1. Unlike the earlier earthquake, its effects are largely confined to Arraiolos area.
- 9–25 February – Portugal contests the 2018 Winter Olympics in Pyeongchang with a delegation comprising cross-country skier Kequyen Lam and alpine skier Arthur Hanse.

=== March ===
- 15 March – One person is killed and another is injured after a rockslide falls on a group of tourists camping on a beach less than one mile north of Cape Roca. The incident comes one night after the passing of Storm Gisele over the area, which authorities cite as the cause of the subsequent cliffside instability.
- 25 March – Approximately 67,500 trees are planted by 3,000 volunteers in Leiria, marking the start of a reforestation project to repair a 13th-century pine forest badly affected by the wildfires in October 2017 which killed 49 people.

=== April ===
- 4 April – Redes Energéticas Nacionais announces that the electricity demand of the nation was met entirely by renewable energy in March, the first time this has been recorded in Portugal in the 21st century.
- 13 April – MPs in the Assembly of the Republic approve a law allowing individuals to change their gender on legal documents from the age of sixteen without the need of a medical report.

=== May ===
- 5 May – In association football, F.C. Porto win the 2017–18 Primeira Liga after their title rivals S.L. Benfica and Sporting CP draw 0–0, leaving the club with an unassailable points lead with two games of the season remaining. It is the club's first league championship in five years.
- 10 May – President Marcelo Rebelo de Sousa vetoes the gender change law passed by MPs on 13 April, citing concerns about the proposed lack of medical consultations for those aged between sixteen and eighteen. An amended proposal acceding to Rebelo de Sousa's wishes is later passed by the Assembly in July.
- 12 May – Lisbon hosts the final of the 2018 Eurovision Song Contest following the victory of Portugal's Salvador Sobral in the previous year's contest. Israel's Netta Barzilai is voted as the winner.
- 15 May – Approximately 50 masked intruders gain access the training centre of football club Sporting CP, inflicting minor injuries to players and staff and causing minor damage to facilities.
- 20 May – In motor racing, Belgium's Thierry Neuville wins the 2018 Rally de Portugal.
- 29 May – MPs narrowly vote against a bill legalising the voluntary use of euthanasia for consenting terminally-ill patients. Introduced by the Socialist Party and supported by the Left Bloc and a number of Social Democratic MPs, the bill is defeated 115–110 after opposition from the CDS – People's Party and the Communist Party.

=== June ===
- 15 June – MPs pass a bill legalising the use of prescription drugs containing marijuana.
- 30 June – In association football, Portugal are eliminated from the 2018 FIFA World Cup following a 2–1 loss to Uruguay in the round of 16 at Sochi's Fisht Olympic Stadium.

=== July ===
- 6 July – A bid by the sole MP of the People-Animals-Nature party to ban bullfighting is opposed in the Assembly by 178 votes to 31.
- 27 July – Prime Minister António Costa agrees a deal with his French and Spanish counterparts for the construction of a new electricity power line under the Bay of Biscay to improve energy links between the three countries. Expected to cost more than €1 billion, the 370-kilometre (230 mi) line is forecast to be completed by 2025.

=== August ===
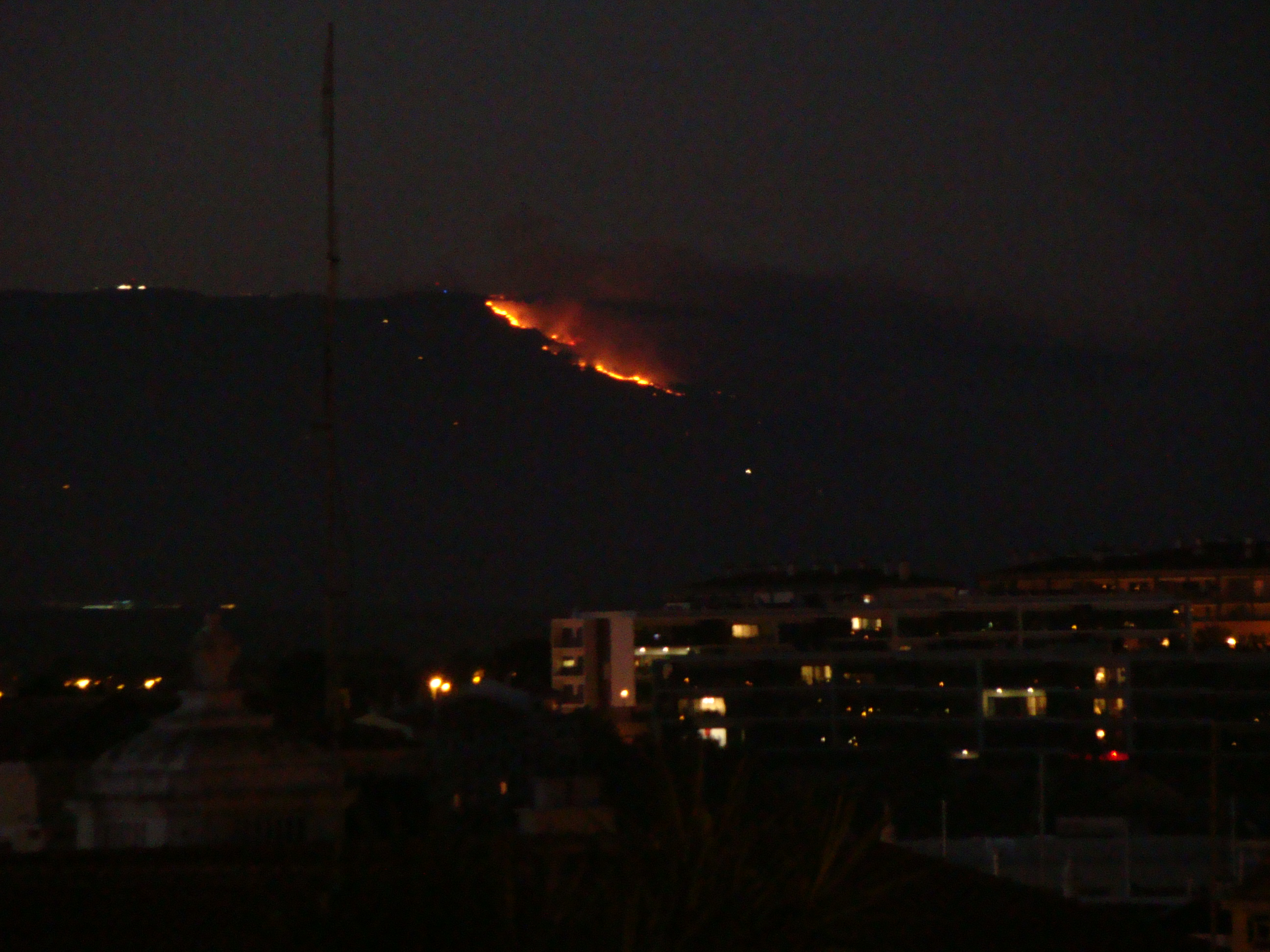
7 August: A wildfire continues to burn in Monchique following a spell of warm weather

- 3–10 August – European heat wave:
  - A mass of warm air from the Sahara causes a heat wave across large parts of Europe in which national temperatures rise above 40°C. A national high of 45.9°C is observed at Alcácer do Sal near Setúbal on 3 August, a day that sees sixteen weather stations across the country set new local temperature records.
  - Warm and dry conditions lead to an outbreak of wildfires, with 700 firefighters attending a blaze in Monchique in the Algarve affecting over 1,000 hectares (3.9 sq mi) of forest. On 10 August the fires are extinguished after burning for a week, by which point cooler conditions begin to prevail across southern Portugal.
- 12 August – In cycling, Spain's Raúl Alarcón wins the 2018 Volta a Portugal in a time of 41 hours, 15 minutes, and 32 seconds.

=== September ===
- 24 September – Archaeologists announce the discovery of a 400-year old shipwreck off the coast of Cascais thought to have been involved in the trading of spices between Europe and India. Artefacts recovered include a bronze cannon bearing the Portuguese coat of arms and Chinese porcelain dating to the time of the Wanli Emperor.

=== October ===
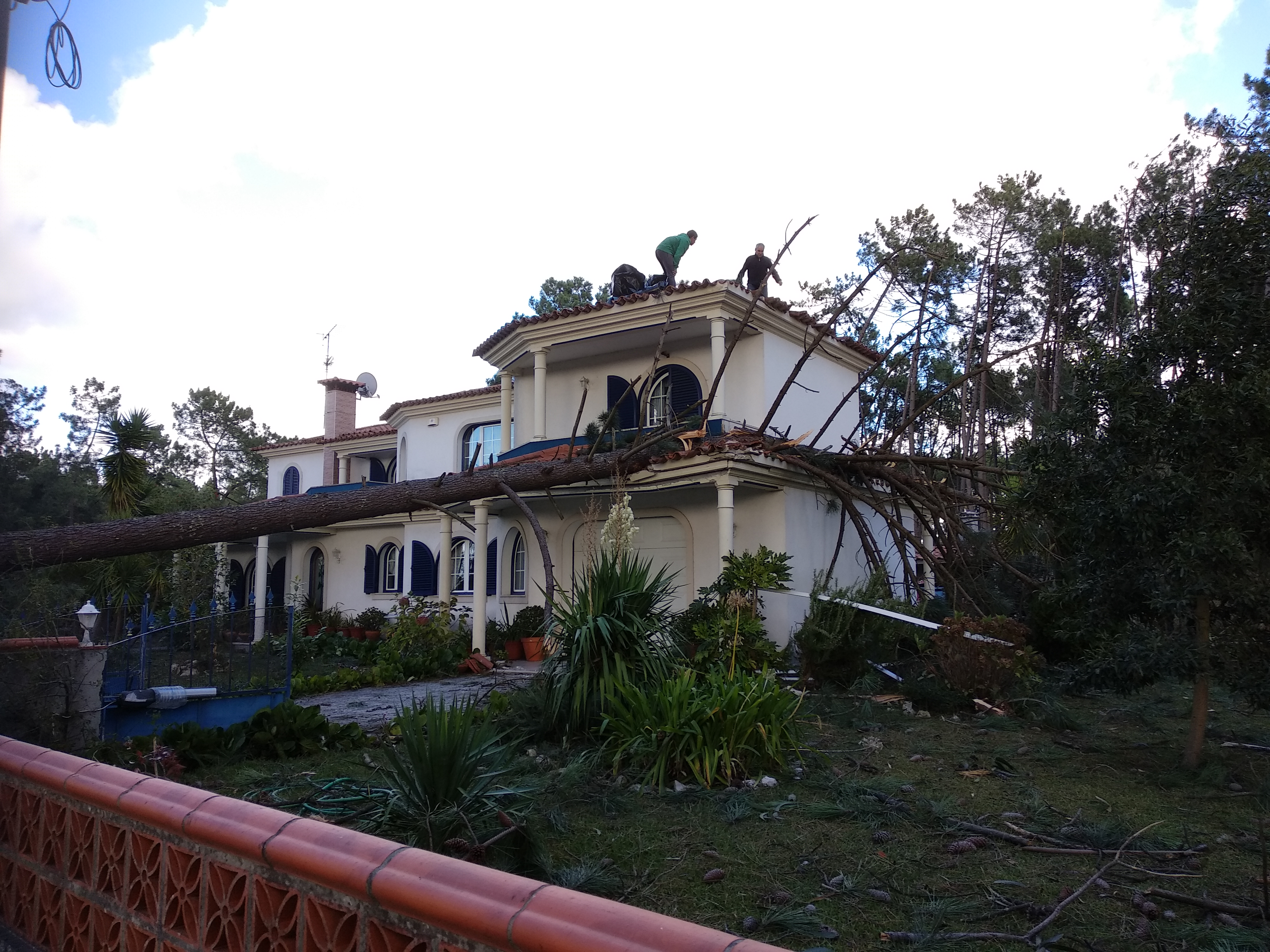
14 October: A damaged property in the Leiria District following Storm Leslie

- 12 October – Minister of National Defence José Alberto Azeredo Lopes resigns amid a political scandal over the theft of military weapons from an arms depot in Tancos in June 2017.
- 13 October – Storm Leslie passes over north and central Portugal, injuring 27 people and leaving 300,000 homes without power. Hurricane-strength winds of up to 109 miles per hour (175 km/h) uproot trees and cause damage and disruption across Lisbon and the districts of Leiria and Coimbra; the districts of Porto, Aveiro, and Viseu to the north are also affected. It is the most powerful storm to hit the country since 1842.
- 14 October – Prime Minister António Costa undertakes the largest major cabinet reshuffle of his premiership, moving Pedro Siza Vieira to the Ministry of Economy and appointing Graca Maria da Fonseca and Marta Temido as Ministers of Culture and Health respectively. Azeredo Lopes, who resigned from his post as the Ministry of National Defence two days earlier, is replaced by Joao Gomes Cravinho.

=== November ===
- 19 November – The collapse of a road at a quarry in the Évora District leaves two people dead and a further four missing. Following thirteen days of rescue operations the final death tally is revised to five on 1 December.

=== December ===
- 14 December – Twenty-eight passengers and pedestrians are injured when a tram derails in Lisbon.
- 15 December – Four people are killed after a AgustaWestland AW109 air ambulance crashes in the Valongo municipality following the transfer of a patient to Porto's Santo António Hospital. It is the first incident of its kind involving an emergency medical aircraft ever recorded in the country.

== Culture ==
=== Film ===
- Até Que o Porno Nos Separe (Until Porn Do Us Part) by Jorge Pelicano.
- Diamantino by Gabriel Abrantes and Daniel Schmidt.

== Deaths ==
=== January to March ===
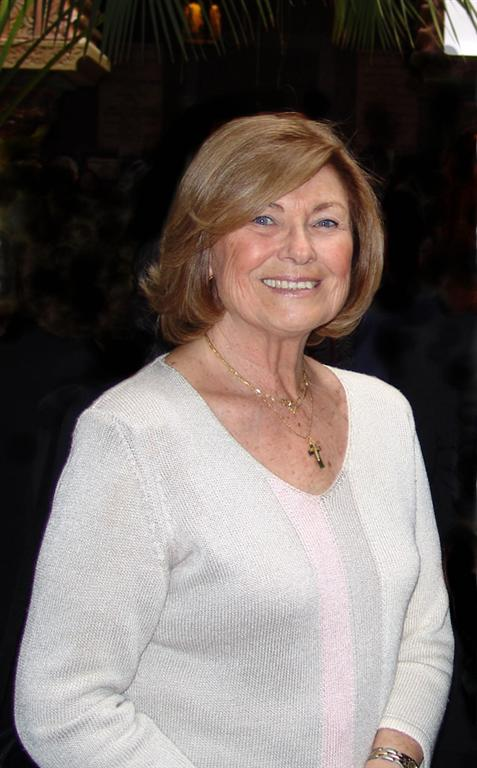
Madalena Iglésias in 2010

- 2 January – Guida Maria, actress (born 1950).
- 16 January – Madalena Iglésias, actress and singer (born 1939).
- 27 January – Edmundo Pedro, politician and political prisoner (Tarrafal camp), member of the Assembly of the Republic (born 1918).
- 20 March – João Calvão da Silva, politician (born 1952).
- 27 March – António dos Santos, Roman Catholic prelate, Bishop of Guarda (born 1932).

=== April to June ===
- 6 April – Acácio Pereira Magro, politician, economist and academic (born 1932).
- 8 April – António Barros, footballer (born 1949).
- 7 May – António Saraiva, footballer (born 1934).
- 21 May – António Arnault, poet, fiction writer, essayist, lawyer, and politician (born 1936).
- 22 May – Júlio Pomar, painter (born 1926).

=== July to September ===
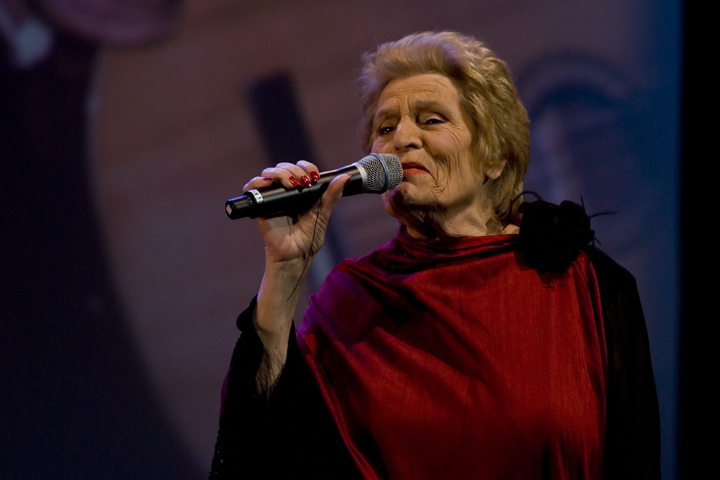
Celeste Rodrigues in 2008

- 12 July – Laura Soveral, actress (born 1933).
- 17 July – João Semedo, pulmonologist and politician (born 1951).
- 29 July – António José Rafael, Roman Catholic prelate, Bishop of Bragança-Miranda (born 1925).
- 1 August – Celeste Rodrigues, fado singer (born 1923).
- 18 August – Pedro Queiroz Pereira, businessman (born 1949).
- 25 September – Helena Almeida, photographer and painter (born 1934).
- 29 September – Alves Barbosa, road cyclist (born 1931).

=== October to December ===
- 3 November – Maria Guinot, singer (born 1945).
- 8 December – Maria Teresa Cárcomo Lobo, politician and jurist (born 1929).
