= 2019 in Portugal =

- Decades: 1990s; 2000s; 2010s; 2020s; 2030s
- See also: History of Portugal; Timeline of Portuguese history; List of years in Portugal

Events in the year 2019 in Portugal.

== Incumbents ==
- President: Marcelo Rebelo de Sousa
- Prime Minister: António Costa (Socialist)

== Events ==
=== January ===
- 8 January – Funding worth €1.15 billion for both an expansion of Lisbon Airport and the construction of a second airport in Montijo is agreed to by the government and French company Vinci SGEF.PA. The plans for the new airport, which seek to increase capacity for the growing tourism industry, are opposed by environmental campaigners over the ecological value of the proposed Montijo site.
- 10 January – A programme investing €10 billion into infrastructure works by 2030 is approved by the government. Transport projects will receive a majority of the funding with €6 billion earmarked for plans such as improvements to the Lisbon–Porto railway link.
- 16 January:
  - Police intercept 430 kilograms of cocaine hidden within a shipment of bananas in Leixões after receiving a tip-off from the Spanish authorities. The seized cocaine was en route to Spain from Latin America and is estimated to have a street value of approximately €15 million.
  - A Portuguese man, named as Rui Pinto by Portuguese media, is detained in Hungary on charges of extortion after hacking the emails of football clubs F.C. Porto, S.L. Benfica, and Sporting CP. Details from the hacked emails later appear on the website Football Leaks. Pinto's lawyers later confirm his identity as the arrested man.

=== February ===
- 4 February – Portugal joins fifteen other European governments in recognising Juan Guaido as the acting president of Venezuela in the country's leadership dispute.
- 14 February – Figures released by the Instituto Nacional de Estatística (INE) show that the number of tourists visiting Portugal in 2018 was the highest on record at 12.8 million.

=== March ===
- 7 March – In response to the deaths of twelve women to domestic violence since the beginning of the year, the highest number in Portugal for a decade, a national day of mourning is held with flags being flown at half-mast and the Assembly observing a minute's silence.
- 8 March – Between 6,000 and 10,000 people march in Lisbon demanding improvements in pay and working conditions for nurses.
- 26 March – Data from the INE reveals that the government's budget deficit fell to 0.5% of gross domestic product in 2018, the lowest recorded since the Carnation Revolution in 1974.
- 28–29 March – A series of wildfires break out in the north of the country after a spell of unseasonably warm and dry weather. There are no reports of any injuries.

=== April ===
- 4 April – Amid increasing criticism of nepotism within the government, Secretary of State for the Environment Carlos Martins resigns after the appointment of his cousin as his assistant becomes public.
- 15–18 April – Drivers of fuel-tankers strike over pay and working conditions, agreeing only to deliver supplies to critical infrastructure as part of a legal minimum service requirement. Despite government requests motorists form long queues at petrol stations across the country, thousands of which run completely dry. The strike ends on 18 April after the drivers' employers agree to hold talks the following month.
- 17 April – At least 29 people are killed and a further 27 are injured in a bus crash on the island of Madeira.
- 24 April – Shareholders of utilities company Energias de Portugal, the largest business in the country, reject a €9 billion buy-out bid by the Chinese energy company China Three Gorges.

=== May ===
- 9 May – The Institute for Nature Conservation and Forests confirms that sightings made earlier in the year of a brown bear in the northeastern Montesinho Natural Park constitute the first presence of the species on Portuguese territory in more than 100 years. Though numerous in neighbouring Spain, brown bears have been extinct in Portugal since the mid-19th century.
- 10 May – A bill to financially compensate teachers for a series of wage freezes over the past ten years is opposed by MPs after Prime Minister António Costa threatens to resign his government and call an early general election if passed. Forecast to cost at least €600 million, Costa argues that approval of the bill would have constituted an unacceptable divergence from the government's economic objectives.
- 18 May – In association football, Benfica secure the 2018-19 Primeira Liga title with a 4–1 victory over C.D. Santa Clara, becoming Portuguese football league champions for the 37th time.
- 20 May – Eight police officers are convicted of the kidnapping and assault of six men in an Amadora police station in 2015, the highest number of police officers found guilty in such a case in Portugal.
- 26 May – European Parliament election: The Socialist Party wins the highest proportion of the vote with 35.9%, securing nine of Portugal's twenty-one seats in the European Parliament. The Social Democratic Party finishes second with six seats and 23.6% of the vote. The remaining seats are won by the Left Bloc, the Unitary Democratic Coalition, the CDS – People's Party, and People–Animals–Nature. The result is seen as bolstering the chances of Prime Minister António Costa winning an overall majority in October's general election and represents the worst result for the Social Democratic Party in a national election.

=== June ===
- 2 June – In motor racing, Estonia's Ott Tänak wins the 2019 Rally de Portugal.
- 4 June – The police announce the successful dismantling of a human trafficking network in the north of the country after a six-month investigation. Twenty women are rescued from the trafficking ring and eight foreign nationals are arrested.
- 9 June – In association football, Portugal win the inaugural UEFA Nations League with a 1–0 victory over the Netherlands at the Estádio do Dragão in Porto.
- 21–30 June – Ninety-nine Portuguese athletes contest the 2019 European Games held in the Belarusian capital of Minsk, winning a total of 15 medals. The country's three gold medals are won by Carlos Nascimento in the men's 100-metres, Fu Yu in the women's individual table tennis, and the men's team in beach football.

=== July ===
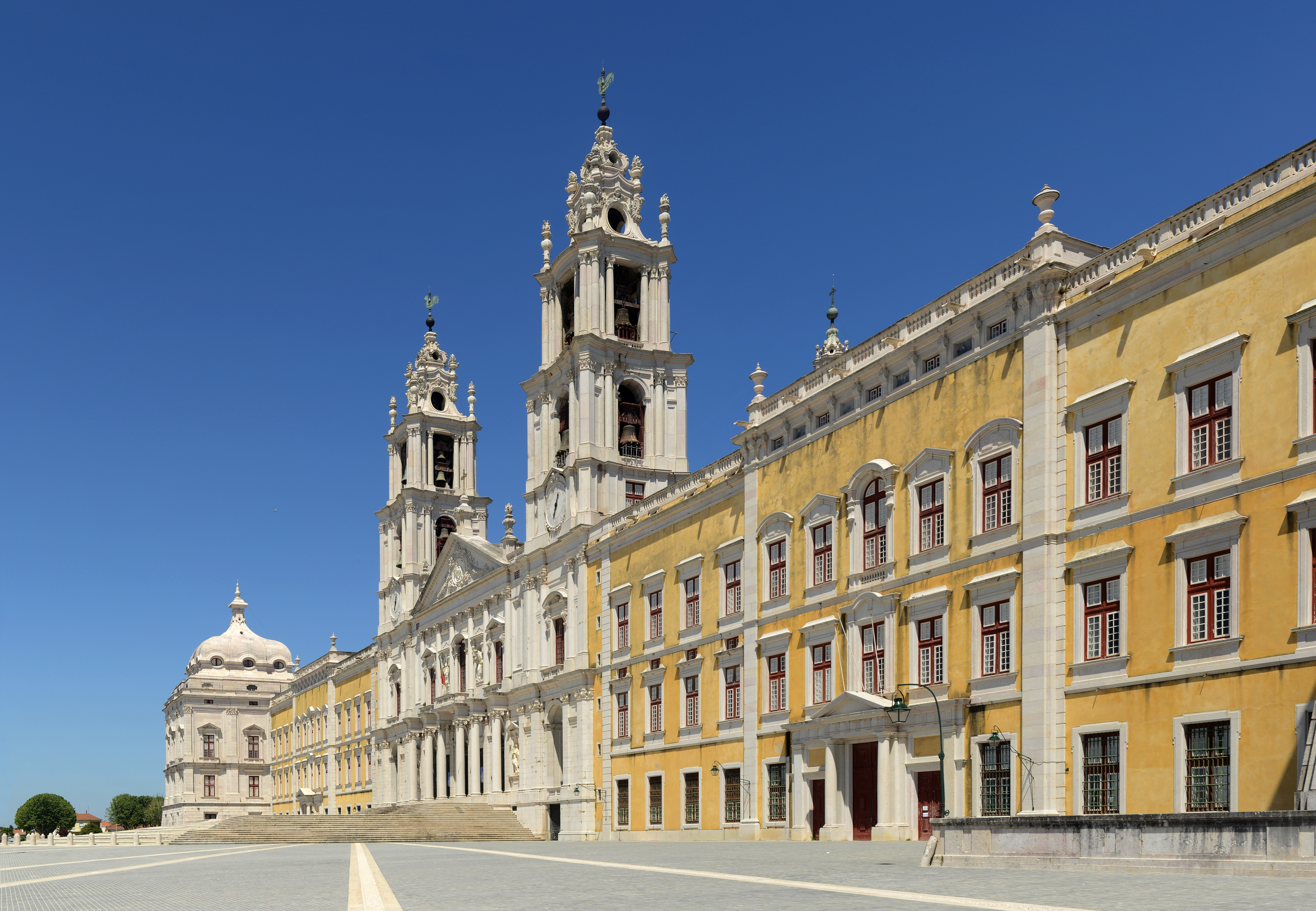
7 July: The Palace of Mafra is awarded UNESCO World Heritage Site status

- 7 July – UNESCO announces the addition of the Palace of Mafra and the Bom Jesus do Monte to its list of World Heritage Sites, bringing the total number of sites in Portugal to seventeen.
- 16 July – Foreign Minister Augusto Santos Silva announces that the government will provisionally withhold from issuing entry visas to citizens of Iran for undisclosed security reasons. Santos Silva also confirms that the move is not a response to any deterioration of Portuguese–Iranian relations.
- 20 July – A series of wildfires break out in the Castelo Branco district, injuring at least 20 people. More than 1,800 firefighters are sent to attempt to contain the outbreak.
- 30 July – The government seizes a series of more than 900 artworks belonging to businessman José Berardo, who had pledged the collection as a guarantee of debt repayments to the state totalling some €1 billion. The paintings, which include works by Joan Miró and Piet Mondrian, have been publicly exhibited in Lisbon's museums since 2006.

=== August ===
- 9 August – In anticipation of a second strike by drivers of fuel-tankers, the government declares an energy crisis to maintain supplies to critical infrastructure such as hospitals and airports. It also announces rationing of petrol and diesel lasting from 10 August until 21 August, restricting motorists to a maximum of 15 litres of fuel.
- 11 August – In cycling, João Rodrigues wins the 2019 Volta a Portugal in a time of 40 hours, 57 minutes, and 4 seconds.
- 12–16 August – Fuel-tanker drivers strike for the second time this year over pay and working conditions. In their absence police officers and soldiers are drafted in to help maintain supplies to key sectors. Fourteen striking drivers are meanwhile cited by the government for flouting a decree mandating their co-operation in deliveries to hospitals and other critical infrastructure. After five days the fuel-tanker drivers agree to end their strike on 16 August and enter negotiations.

=== September ===
- 4 September – A new law tightening penalties against the littering of cigarette butts in public areas is introduced, with offenders facing fines of up to €250 from September 2020.
- 4–5 September – Two helicopters crash in separate incidents on successive days while tackling wildfires in northern Portugal, leaving the pilot of the first with minor injuries and killing the pilot of the second.
- 11 September – MPs vote to condemn the planned opening of a museum later in the year dedicated to António de Oliveira Salazar, the authoritarian Prime Minister of Portugal from 1932 to 1968, in Salazar's hometown of Santa Comba Dão.
- 22 September – Madeiran regional election: The Social Democratic Party loses the majority it has held in the Legislative Assembly since 1976 and enters into a coalition with the CDS – People's Party.
- 26 September – Prosecutors announce that the former Defence Minister José Azeredo Lopes will face charges including abuse of power, denial of justice, and misfeasance over his role in the theft of arms from a military depot in Tancos in June 2017. Azeredo Lopes, who resigned from his post in 2018, is one of 23 defendants who will stand trial over the incident and the attempted obstruction of the subsequent police investigation.

=== October ===
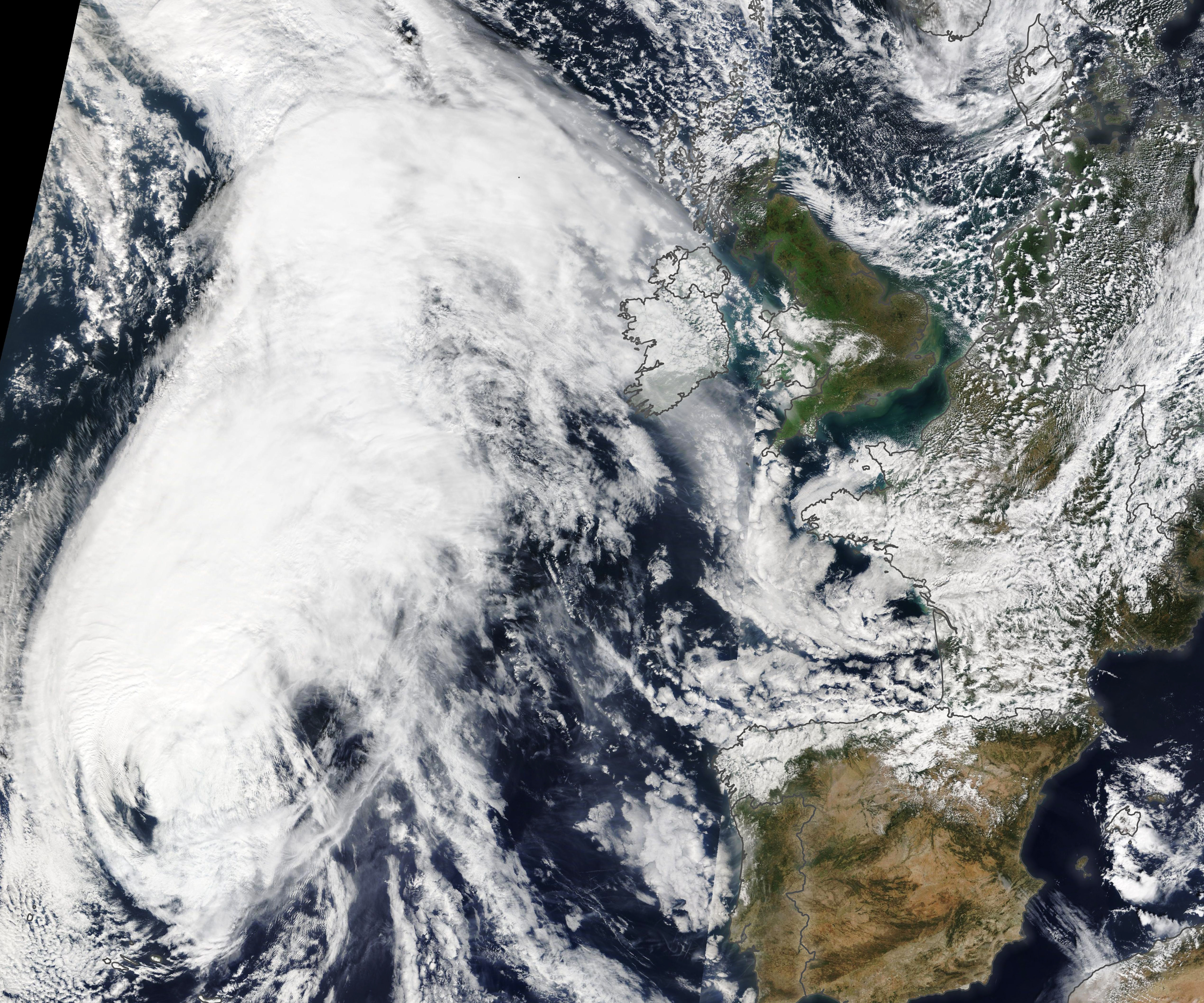
2 October: Hurricane Lorenzo passes near the Azores at Category 1 strength

- 2 October – Hurricane Lorenzo passes near the western Azores, bringing strong winds to much of the archipelago and severely damaging the main port on Flores. There are no reports of any injuries.
- 6 October – Legislative election: The Socialist Party of Prime Minister António Costa wins 106 seats to remain the largest party in the Assembly, taking 36.7% of votes ahead of the Social Democratic Party on 29.7%. Short by an overall majority of ten seats, Costa announces negotiations to continue his party's alliance with the Left Bloc and the Portuguese Communist Party for another term. Chega meanwhile becomes the first far-right party to win a seat in the Assembly since the Carnation Revolution. Turnout falls to 54.5%, the lowest for a general election since Portugal's return to democracy in 1974.
- 22 October – The Ordem dos Médicos suspends obstetrician Artur Carvalho over claims of negligent conduct after failing to detect severe fetal abnormalities in a boy born on 7 October in Setúbal. Further cases of similar negligence by Carvalho spanning more than 10 years subsequently emerge, prompting media debates over procedures within the national health care system.

=== November ===
- 13 November – Prime Minister António Costa unveils government plans to raise the monthly minimum wage from €600 to €635 on 1 January 2020 as part of a pledge to reach €750 by 2023.

=== December ===
- 5 December – Government officials confirm that Chinese technology company Huawei will not be prevented from helping to develop the nation's 5G wireless network. The decision comes amid warnings to European nations from United States Secretary of State Mike Pompeo over the risk of Huawei passing critical and confidential data onto the Chinese government.
- 19–20 December – Two people are killed and 50 are made homeless in Porto as Storm Elsa passes over the country, bringing severe rainfall and flooding. The weather causes disruption to ferry services across the Tagus and to train services between Lisbon and Porto, the latter of which are temporarily halted until 22 December.

== Ongoing events ==
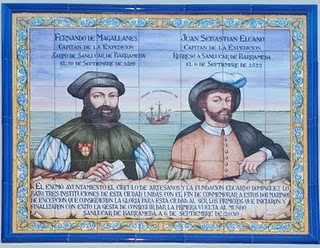
A ceramic azulejo panel commemorating the first circumnavigation of the world

- Sanlúcar de Barrameda 2019–2022 – A series of events held in Spain and Portugal between 2019 and 2022 commemorating the 500th anniversary of the first circumnavigation of the globe by Ferdinand Magellan and Juan Sebastián Elcano.

== Anniversaries ==
- 1 July – The 600th anniversary of the discovery of Madeira Island, according to tradition.

== Deaths ==
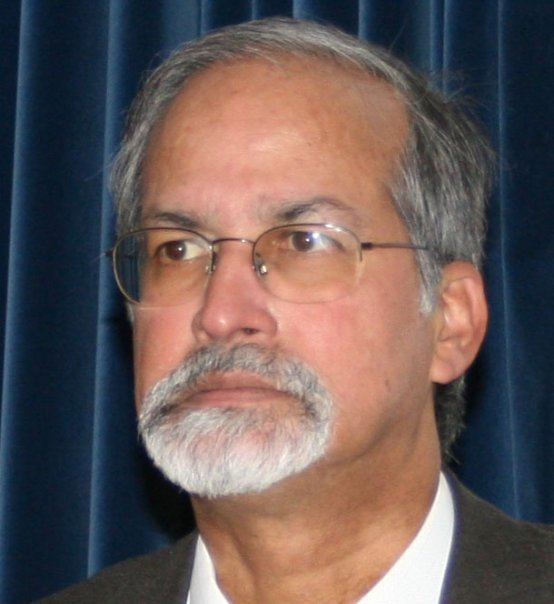
Teotónio de Souza in 2009

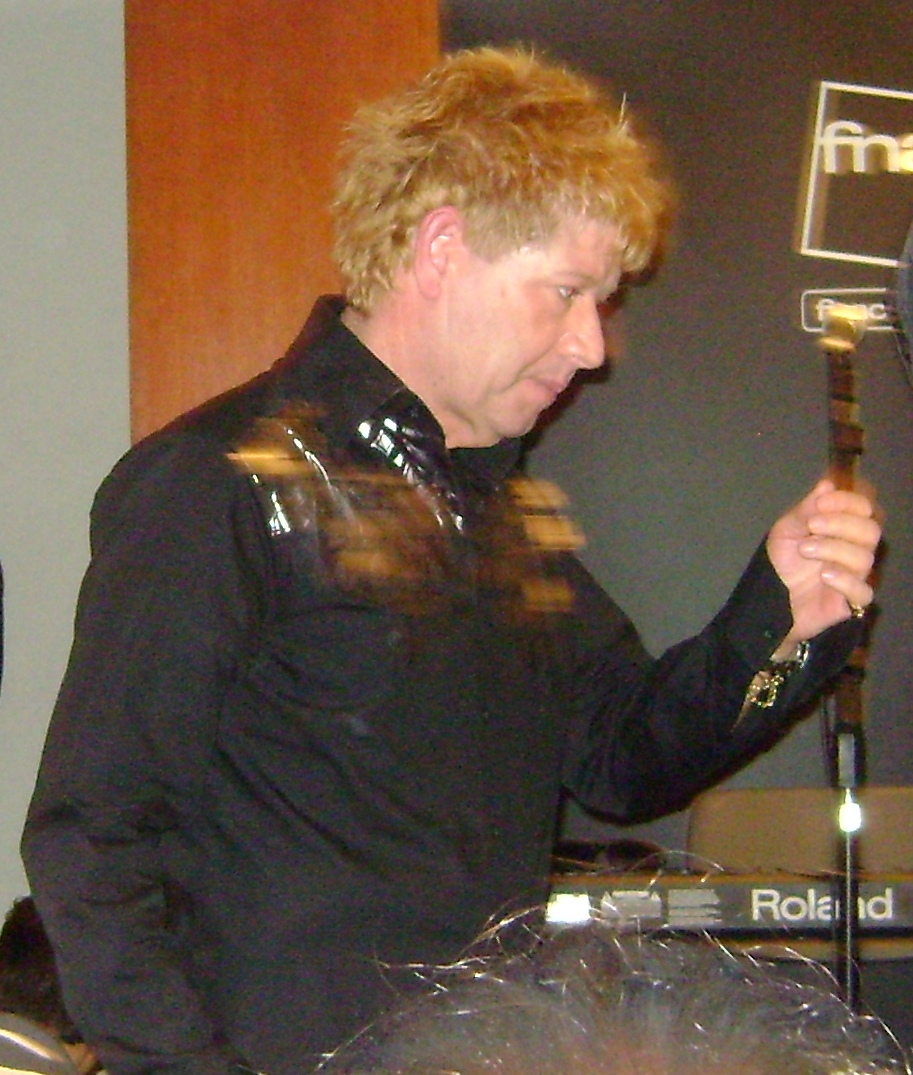
Roberto Leal in 2010

=== January to March ===
- 14 January – Francisco de Oliveira Dias, politician (born 1930).
- 24 January – Altino Pinto de Magalhães, military officer and politician, President of the Regional Junta of the Azores (1975–1976) (born 1922).
- 3 February – Octávio Matos, actor (born 1939).
- 10 February – Fernando Peres, footballer (born 1943).
- 20 February – Teotónio de Souza, historian (born 1946).
- 21 February – Sequeira Costa, pianist (born 1929).
- 14 March – Augusto Cid, cartoonist (born 1941).

=== April to June ===
- 11 April – Dina, singer (born 1956).
- 15 April – Maria Alberta Menéres, author and poet (born 1930).
- 3 June – Agustina Bessa-Luís, writer (born 1922).

=== July to September ===
- 1 July:
  - Manuel da Costa Braz, military officer and politician (born 1934).
  - António Manuel Hespanha, historian and lawyer (born 1945).
- 18 July – André Bradford, politician (born 1970).
- 16 August – Alexandre Soares dos Santos, businessman (born 1934).
- 15 September – Roberto Leal, singer (born 1951).

=== October to December ===
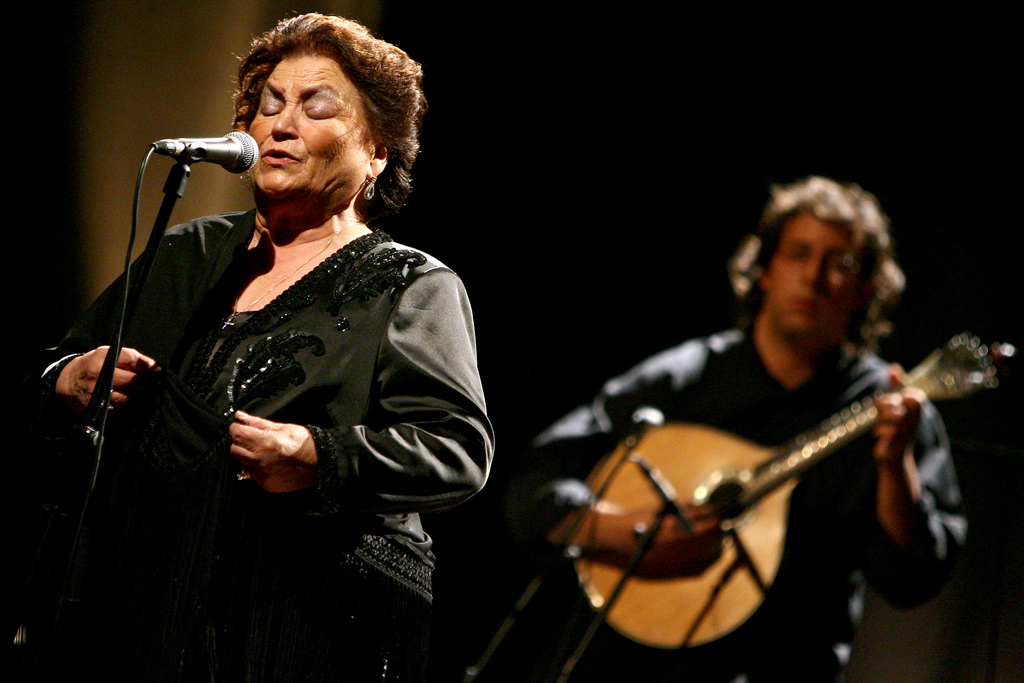
Argentina Santos (left) in 2007

- 3 October – Diogo Freitas do Amaral, politician, acting Prime Minister (1980–81) (born 1941).
- 8 October – Avelino Ferreira Torres, politician (born 1945).
- 11 November – Teresa Tarouca, fado singer (born 1942).
- 18 November – Argentina Santos, fado singer (born 1924).
- 19 November – José Mário Branco, singer-songwriter and record producer (born 1942).
- 3 December – Carlos Amaral Dias, psychoanalyst and academic (born 1946).
- 17 December – Fernando Lemos, artist (born 1926).

== See also ==
- 2019 European Parliament election in Portugal
