= 1940 in Portugal =

- Decades: 1920s; 1930s; 1940s; 1950s; 1960s
- See also: History of Portugal; Timeline of Portuguese history; List of years in Portugal

Events in the year 1940 in Portugal.

== Incumbents ==
- President: Óscar Carmona
- Prime Minister: António de Oliveira Salazar (National Union)

== Events ==
- Portuguese Mathematical Society founded
- Portuguese World Exhibition

== Births ==
- 11 March – Sebastião Alba, poet (d. 2000)
- 30 July – Nicolau Breyner, playwright and actor (d. 2016)

=== Full date missing ===
- Ana Vieira, artist (d. 2016)

== Deaths ==
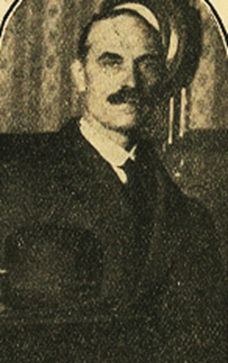
Abel Fontoura da Costa

- 28 June – António Ginestal Machado, politician (born 1874)

=== Full date missing ===
- Abel Fontoura da Costa, colonial administrator (born 1869).
