= Sebastião Alba =

Portuguese poet

Sebastião Alba (11 March 1940 – 14 October 2000) was a Portuguese poet, born in Braga who lived a long period of his life in former Portuguese colony Mozambique. He became a journalist in Mozambique and published three books of poetry before his decline caused by alcoholism. The last two decades of his life, he became a homeless alcoholic wandering and living in the streets of Braga. During this period he wrote poems and texts on scrap papers, napkins and often giving them to friends and family. These writings were posthumously compiled in a book called "Albas" edited in 2003. He died in 2000 as he was hit by a motorist.

== Published works ==
- Poesias, 1965
- O ritmo do presságio, 1974
- A noite dividida, 1982
- Albas, 2003

== Sources ==
- List of poets (in Portuguese)
