= Manuela Saraiva de Azevedo =

Portuguese journalist

- Born: August 31, 1911
- Died: February 10, 2017 (aged 105)
- Occupation: Journalist

Manuela Saraiva de Azevedo (31 August 1911 – 10 February 2017) was a Portuguese journalist and writer. She was the first woman to become a professional journalist in Portugal, working for, among others, the República, Diário de Lisboa and Diário de Notícias newspapers from 1935 until her retirement in 1996. Between 1942 and 1945 she worked as a magazine editor before moving to the Diário de Lisboa, where in 1946 she was the first journalist to interview the exiled Umberto II of Italy following the establishment of the Italian Republic.

In 2016 she was presented with the Order of Public Instruction by President Marcelo Rebelo de Sousa. de Azevedo died in Lisbon on 10 February 2017 at the age of 105. According to the Jornal de Notícias newspaper, she was the world's oldest journalist the time of her death.
