= José Fernandes Fafe =

Portuguese diplomat and writer

José Fernandes Fafe (January 31, 1927 – February 20, 2017) was a Portuguese diplomat and writer. He is the author of more than 20 books, including poetry, romance and essays.

He was the ambassador of Portugal to Cuba (1974-1977), Mexico (1977-1980), Cabo Verde (1985-1990) and Argentina (1990-1992), being also itinerant ambassador to the Portuguese-speaking African countries.
