= António José Rafael =

Portuguese Roman Catholic bishop

António José Rafael (11 November 1925 – 29 July 2018) was a Roman Catholic bishop.

Rafael was born in Portugal and was ordained to the priesthood in 1948. He served as bishop of the Roman Catholic Diocese of Bragança-Miranda, Portugal, from 1979 to 2001.
