= Armando Baptista-Bastos =

Portuguese journalist and writer

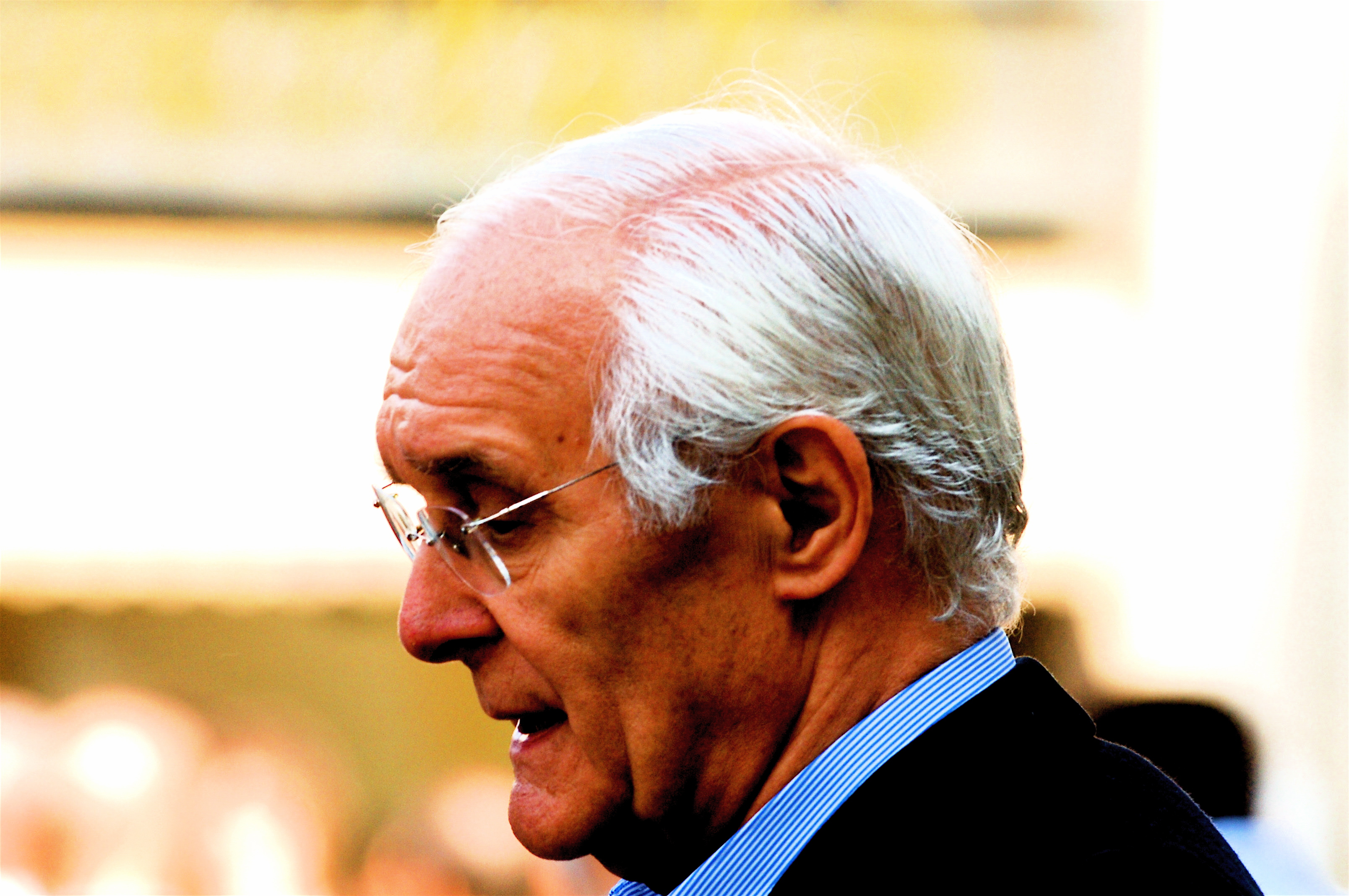
- Baptista Bastos in 2006.
- Born: 27 February 1933; Lisbon
- Died: 9 May 2017 (aged 84); Lisbon
- Occupations: Journalist and writer

Armando Baptista-Bastos (born and died Lisbon, Portugal; 27 February 1933 – 9 May 2017) was a Portuguese journalist and writer.

Baptista-Bastos' mother died when he was young. His father, a printer by trade, influenced his interest in journalism and writing. Baptista-Bastos also studied French at the Liceu Francês Charles Lepierre.
