= Argentina Santos =

Portuguese singer (1924–2019)

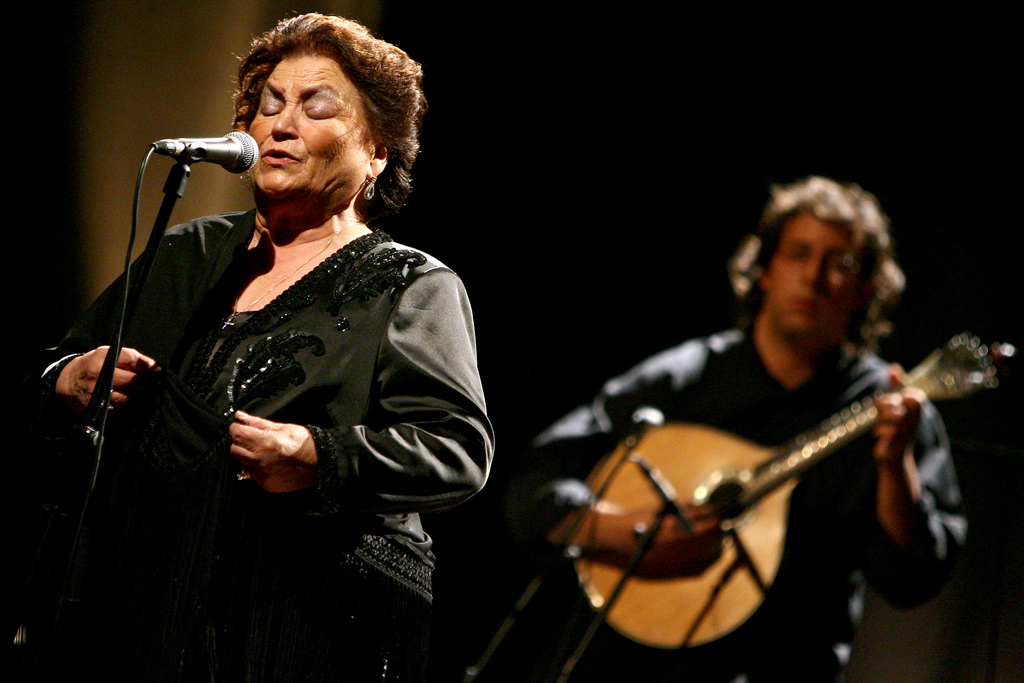
- Born: 6 February 1924; Lisbon
- Died: 18 November 2019 (aged 95)
- Occupation: Fado singer

Argentina Santos or Maria Argentina Pinto dos Santos (6 February 1924 – 18 November 2019) was a Portuguese singer considered one of the last great Fado singers.

== Life ==
Santos was born in the Mouraria area of Lisbon in 1924. She started school but left so quickly that she was illiterate and had to learn reading and writing much later. She was interested in singing but married twice and neither of her husbands approved of her singing in public. It was only after her second husband died that she was able to regain her career and her singing became popular.

In 1950 she took charge of the Lisbon restaurant "Parreirinha de Alfama" which became a centre for Fado playing.

In 1995 she began to appear on Portuguese television and the following year she was performing on Brazilian TV. She appeared in several European cities including appearing at the Edinburgh Festival.

In 2005 she was given an award in Lisbon for her singing.

In 2013 she was given an award (Infant D Henrique) by the Portuguese government.

She died in Lisbon's Santa Maria Hospital in 2019.
