= 1937 in Portugal =

- Decades: 1910s; 1920s; 1930s; 1940s; 1950s
- See also: History of Portugal; Timeline of Portuguese history; List of years in Portugal

Events in the year 1937 in Portugal.

== Incumbents ==
- President: Óscar Carmona
- Prime Minister: António de Oliveira Salazar (National Union)

== Sports ==
- A.A. Avanca founded
- G.D. Fabril founded
- Mem Martins Sport Clube founded
- UD Sousense founded

== Births ==
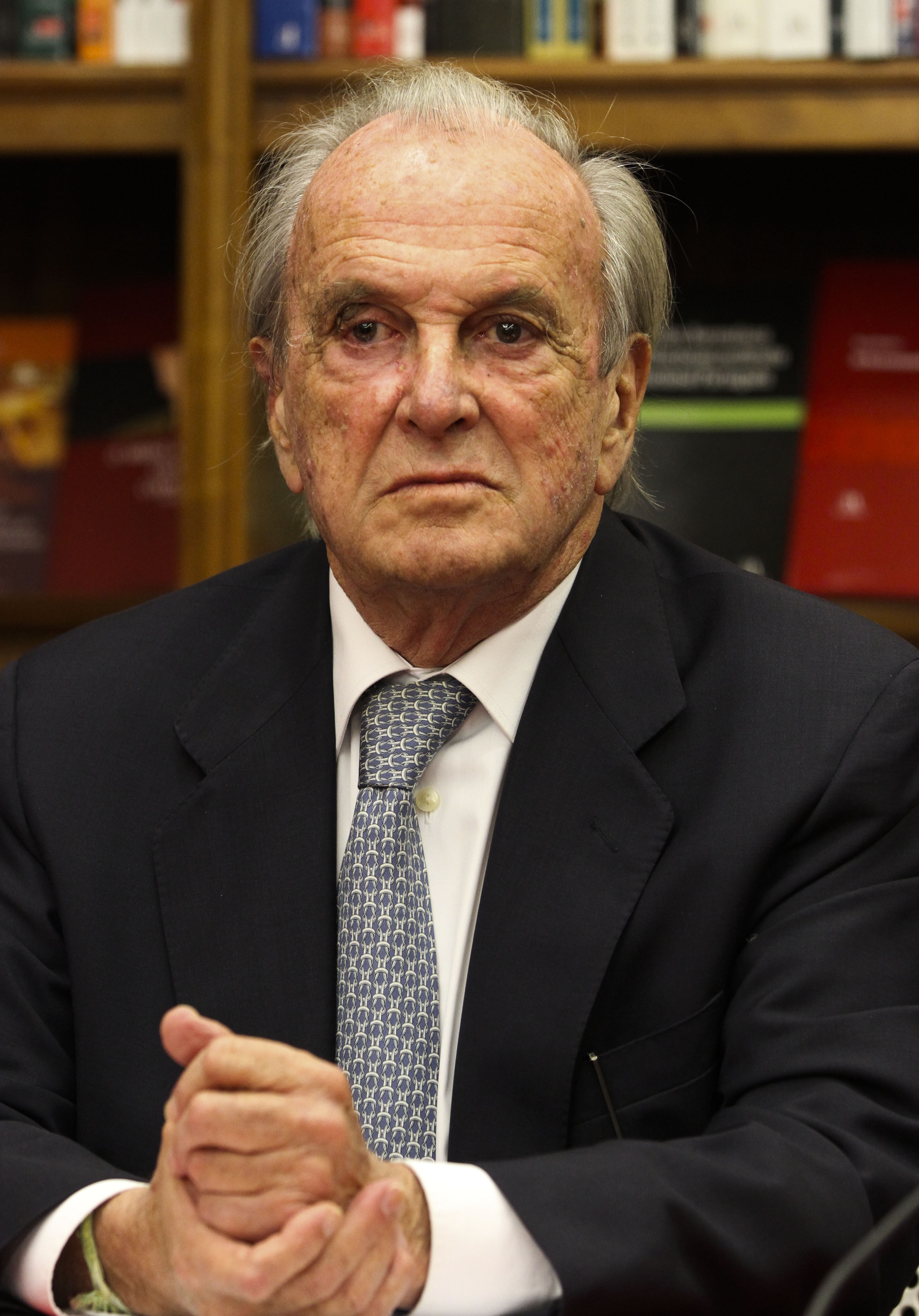
Francisco Pinto Balsemão

- 1 September – Francisco Pinto Balsemão, businessman, journalist and politician.
- 7 December - Ary dos Santos, poet, songwriter (died 1984)
