= 1936 in Portugal =

- Decades: 1910s; 1920s; 1930s; 1940s; 1950s
- See also: History of Portugal; Timeline of Portuguese history; List of years in Portugal

Events in the year 1936 in Portugal.

== Incumbents ==
- President: Óscar Carmona
- Prime Minister: António de Oliveira Salazar (National Union)

== Events ==
- Minho Province established
- 1936 Naval Revolt (Portugal)

== Births ==
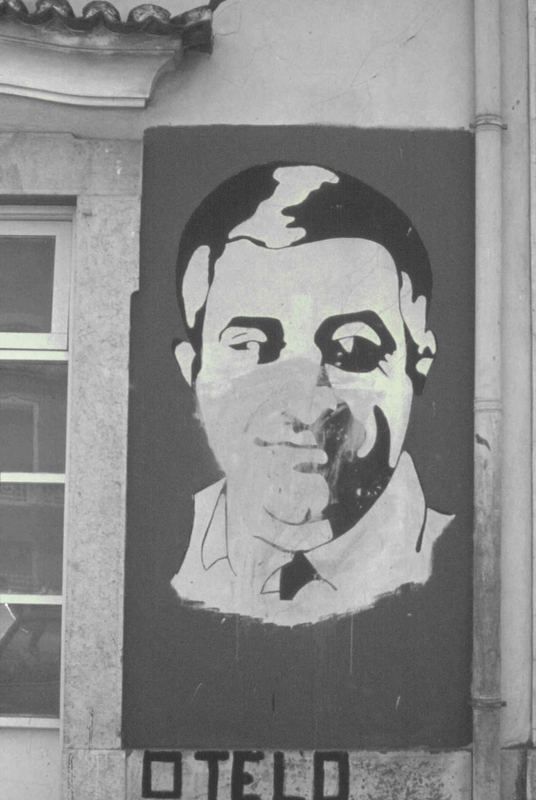
Otelo Saraiva de Carvalho

- 25 July – Carlos Mota Pinto, law professor and politician (died 1985)
- 31 August – Otelo Saraiva de Carvalho, military officer (died 2021).
- 7 November – Maria Nápoles, fencer (born in Mozambique).
