= Ana Vieira =

Portuguese artist

Ana Vieira (Coimbra, 1940 – 29 February 2016) was a Portuguese artist.

== Biography ==
Ana Vieira was born in Coimbra, Portugal, in 1940. She grew up on São Miguel Island in the Azores, Portugal. She lived and worked in the Portuguese capital of Lisbon.

Vieira died in Lisbon in 2016.
