= 1935 in Portugal =

- Decades: 1910s; 1920s; 1930s; 1940s; 1950s
- See also: History of Portugal; Timeline of Portuguese history; List of years in Portugal

Events in the year 1935 in Portugal.

== Incumbents ==
- President: Óscar Carmona
- Prime Minister: António de Oliveira Salazar (National Union)

== Events ==
- 17 February - Presidential election.

== Arts and entertainment ==
- 4 August – Launch of Rádio e Televisão de Portugal
- 4 August – First air date of the radio channel Antenna 1

== Sports ==
- Clube de Futebol Os Armacenenses founded
- Mira Mar SC founded

== Births ==
- 8 January – Isabel Rilvas, acrobatic pilot (d. 2025)
- 25 January – António Ramalho Eanes, general and politician
- 26 January – Paula Rego, visual artist (d. 2022)

== Deaths ==
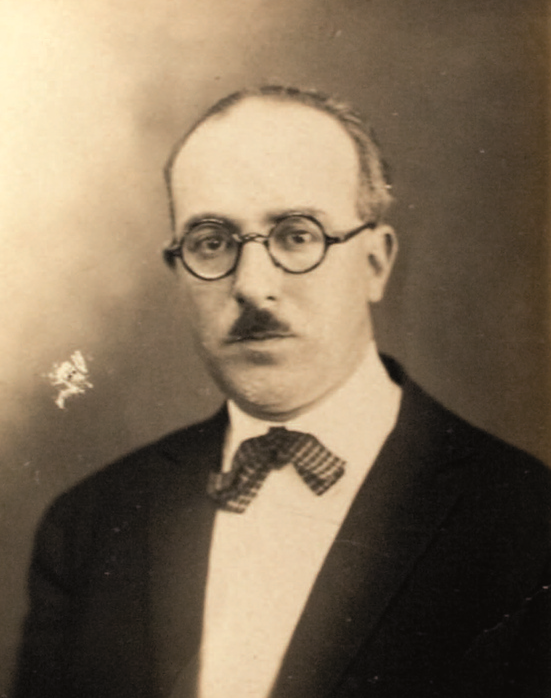
Fernando Pessoa

- 23 March; Ana de Castro Osório, writer, journalist, feminist and republican activist (born 1872)
- 19 May; António Osório Sarmento de Figueiredo Jr., nobleman, jurist, politician and magistrate (born 1855)
- 30 November; Fernando Pessoa writer/poet
