= 1938 in Portugal =

- Decades: 1910s; 1920s; 1930s; 1940s; 1950s
- See also: History of Portugal; Timeline of Portuguese history; List of years in Portugal

Events in the year 1938 in Portugal.

== Incumbents ==
- President: Óscar Carmona
- Prime Minister: António de Oliveira Salazar (National Union)

== Events ==
- 30 October – Portuguese legislative election, 1938.

== Sports ==
- Merelinense F.C. founded
- Moreirense F.C. founded

== Births ==
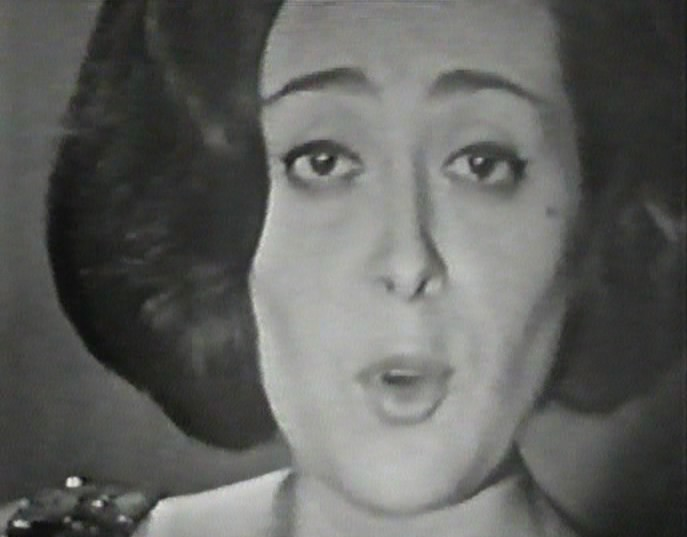
Simone de Oliveira

- 11 February – Simone de Oliveira, singer and actress
- 26 June – Maria Velho da Costa, writer (d. 2020)
- 17 November – Álvaro Cassuto, conductor and composer (d. 2026)

== Deaths ==
- 1 December – Alfredo Rodrigues Gaspar, military officer and politician (born 1865)
