= 1934 in Portugal =

- Decades: 1910s; 1920s; 1930s; 1940s; 1950s
- See also: History of Portugal; Timeline of Portuguese history; List of years in Portugal

Events in the year 1934 in Portugal.

== Incumbents ==
- President: Óscar Carmona
- Prime Minister: António de Oliveira Salazar (National Union)

== Events ==
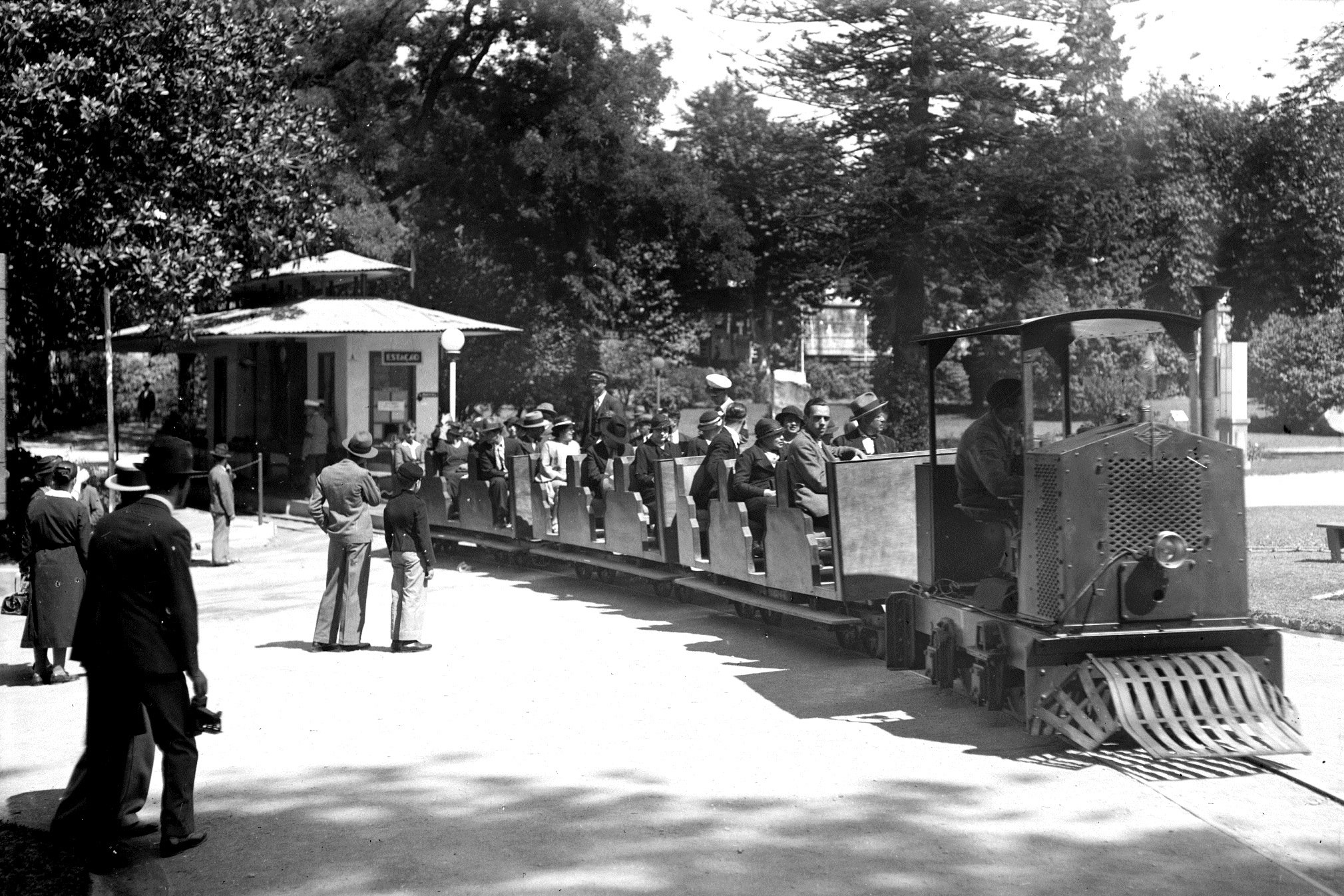
From the Portuguese colonial exhibition

- 18 january - Revolution of the working class in Marinha Grande
- 16 June to 30 September – Portuguese colonial exhibition held in Oporto.
- 16 December – Portuguese legislative election, 1934.

== Sports ==
- The Primeira Liga established
- The club Associação Cultural e Recreativa Alvorense 1º Dezembro founded
- The club Grupo Desportivo Torralta founded
- The club FC Infesta founded
- The club F.C. Lixa founded
- The club SC Lamego founded

== Births ==
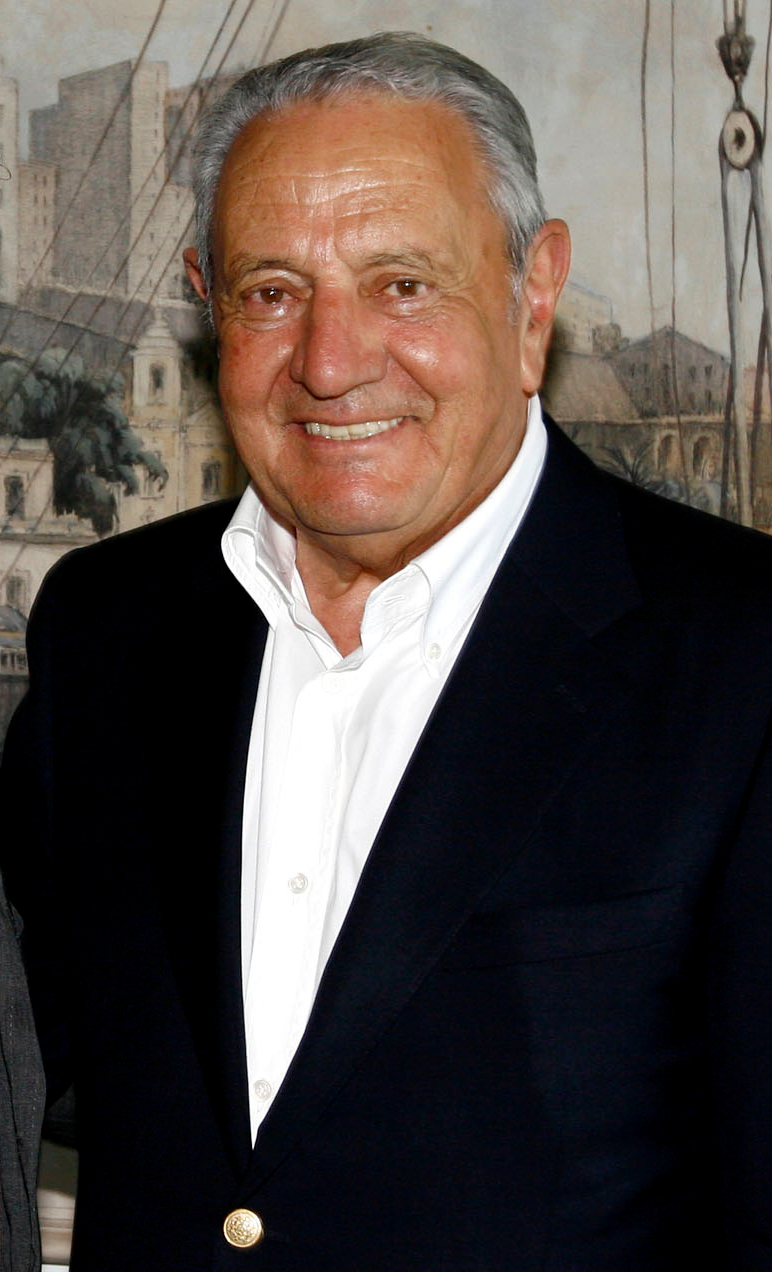
Américo Amorim

- 19 July – Francisco de Sá Carneiro, politician (d. 1980).
- 21 July – Américo Amorim, businessman (d. 2017).

== Deaths ==
- 14 March – João do Canto e Castro, naval officer and politician (born 1862)
