= 1939 in Portugal =

- Decades: 1910s; 1920s; 1930s; 1940s; 1950s
- See also: History of Portugal; Timeline of Portuguese history; List of years in Portugal

Events in the year 1939 in Portugal.

== Incumbents ==
- President: Óscar Carmona
- Prime Minister: António de Oliveira Salazar (National Union)

== Events ==
- 17 March – Signing of the Iberian Pact

== Arts and entertainment ==
- The toy company Majora established

== Sports ==
- Establishment of the Portuguese Roller Hockey First Division.
- F.C. Alverca founded
- G.D. Estoril Praia founded
- S.L. Nelas founded
- Odivelas F.C. founded
- Rio Ave F.C. founded

== Births ==
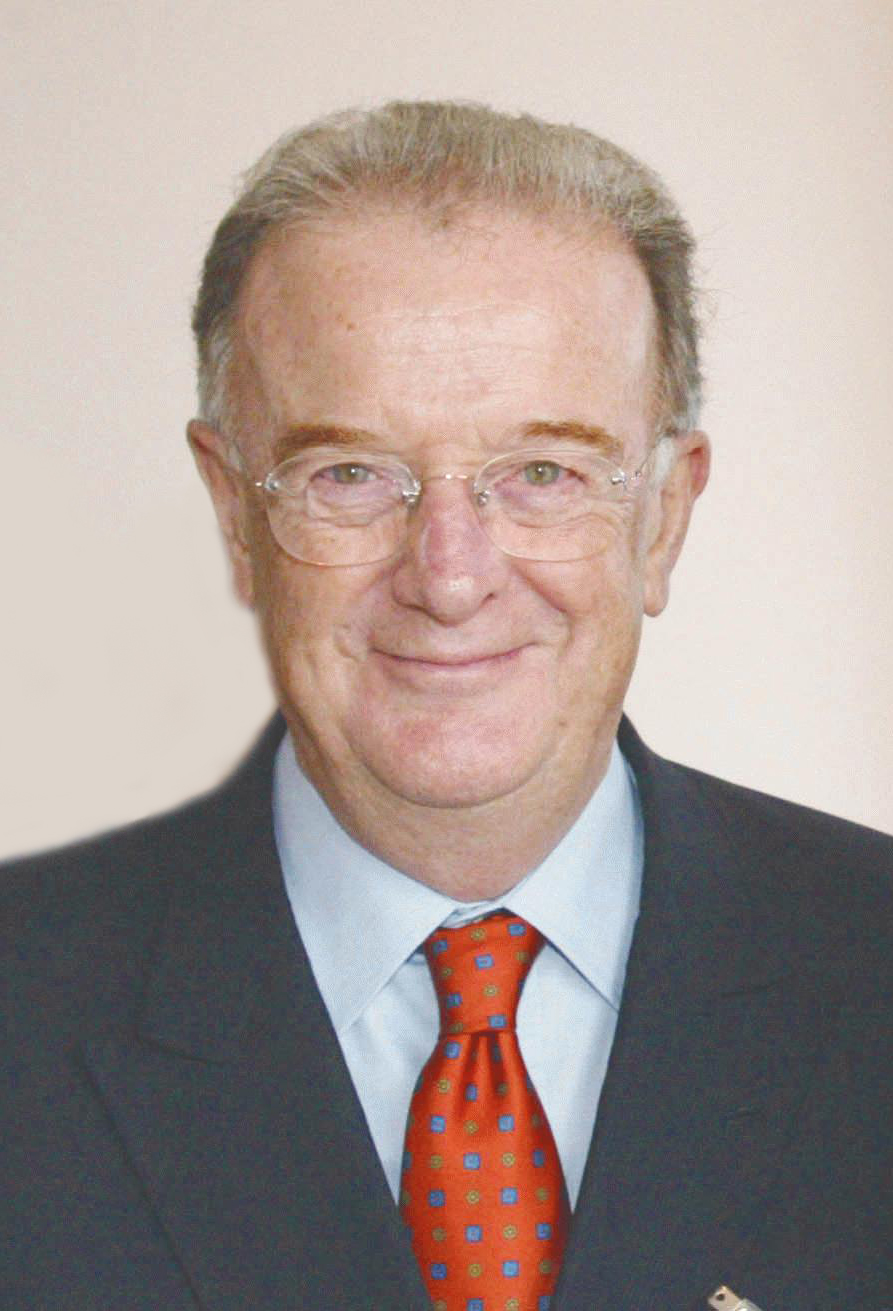
Jorge Sampaio

- 15 July – Aníbal Cavaco Silva, politician
- 18 September – Jorge Sampaio, lawyer and politician. (d. 2021)

== Deaths ==
- 27 March – António Xavier Pereira Coutinho, botanist (born 1851)
- 14 April – José Júlio de Souza Pinto, painter (born 1856)
