= António de Oliveira Salazar =

Dictator of Portugal from 1932 to 1968

His Excellency António de Oliveira Salazar GCTE GCSE GColIH GCIC
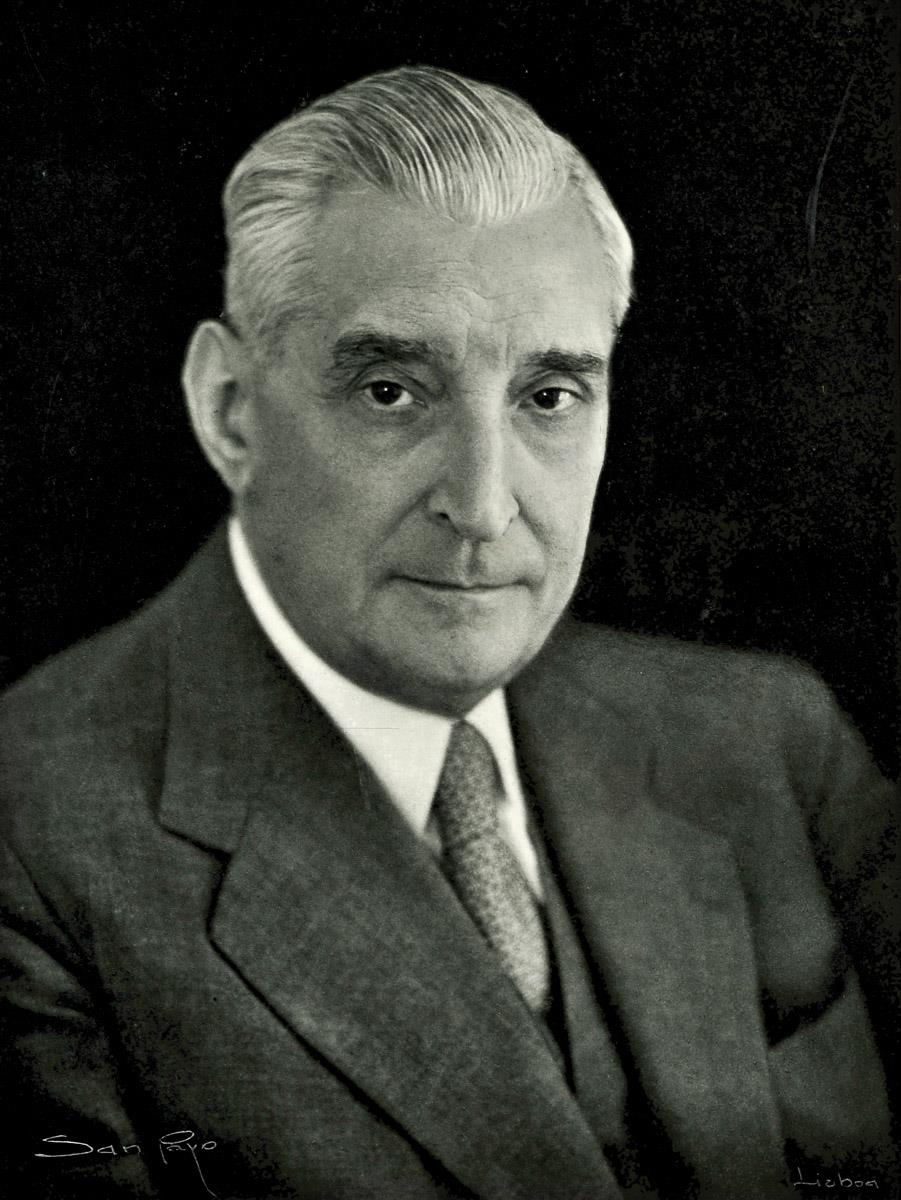
- Formal portrait, c. 1968

Prime Minister of Portugal
- In office 5 July 1932 – 27 September 1968
- President: Óscar Carmona; Himself (acting); Francisco Craveiro Lopes; Américo Tomás
- Preceded by: Domingos Oliveira
- Succeeded by: Marcelo Caetano

Minister of Defence
- In office 13 April 1961 – 4 December 1962
- Prime Minister: Himself
- Preceded by: Júlio Botelho Moniz
- Succeeded by: Manuel Gomes de Araújo

Minister of Finance
- In office 27 April 1928 – 28 August 1940
- Prime Minister: José Vicente de Freitas; Artur Ivens Ferraz; Domingos Oliveira; Himself
- Preceded by: José Vicente de Freitas
- Succeeded by: João Pinto da Costa Leite
- In office 3 June 1926 – 19 June 1926
- Prime Minister: José Mendes Cabeçadas
- Preceded by: José Mendes Cabeçadas
- Succeeded by: Filomeno da Câmara de Melo Cabral

Member of the Chamber of Deputies
- In office July 1921 – September 1921
- Constituency: Guimarães
Offices held ad interim
President of Portugal
Acting; 18 April 1951 – 9 August 1951
Prime Minister	Himself
Preceded by	Óscar Carmona
Succeeded by	Francisco Craveiro Lopes
Acting; 15 April 1935 – 26 April 1935
Prime Minister	Himself
Preceded by	Óscar Carmona
Succeeded by	Óscar Carmona
Minister of the Navy
Acting; 30 January 1939 – 2 February 1939
Prime Minister	Himself
Preceded by	Manuel Ortins de Bettencourt
Succeeded by	Manuel Ortins de Bettencourt
Acting; 25 January 1936 – 5 February 1936
Prime Minister	Himself
Preceded by	Manuel Ortins de Bettencourt
Succeeded by	Manuel Ortins de Bettencourt
Minister of Foreign Affairs
Acting; 6 November 1936 – 6 November 1947
Prime Minister	Himself
Preceded by	Armindo Monteiro
Succeeded by	José Caeiro da Mata
Minister of War
Acting; 11 May 1936 – 6 September 1944
Prime Minister	Himself
Preceded by	Abílio Passos e Sousa
Succeeded by	Fernando Santos Costa
Minister of War
Acting; 5 July 1932 – 6 July 1932
Prime Minister	Himself
Preceded by	António Lopes Mateus
Succeeded by	Daniel Rodrigues de Sousa
Minister of the Colonies
Acting; 3 November 1930 – 6 November 1930
Prime Minister	Domingos Oliveira
Preceded by	Eduardo Marques
Succeeded by	Eduardo Marques
Acting; 21 January 1930 – 20 July 1930
Prime Minister	Domingos Oliveira
Preceded by	Eduardo Marques
Succeeded by	Eduardo Marques

Personal details
- Born: 28 April 1889 Vimieiro, Portugal
- Died: 27 July 1970 (aged 81) Lisbon, Portugal
- Party: National Union (1930–1970)
- Other political affiliations: Portuguese Catholic Centre (1919–1930)
- Height: 1.75 m (5 ft 9 in)
- Education: University of Coimbra (PhD)
- Profession: Economics professor

António de Oliveira Salazar (Note: Pronunciation: English: /ˌsæləˈzɑːr/ SAL-ə-ZAR, US also /ˌsɑːl-/ SAHL-; European Portuguese: [ɐ̃ˈtɔniu ð(ɨ) ɔliˈvɐjɾɐ s̺ɐlɐˈz̻aɾ, ɐ̃ˈtɔnju -].) (28 April 1889 – 27 July 1970) was a Portuguese dictator, academic, and economist who served as the Prime Minister of Portugal from 1932 to 1968. Having come to power under the Ditadura Nacional ("National Dictatorship"), he reframed the regime as the corporatist Estado Novo ("New State"), with himself as dictator. The regime he created lasted until 1974, making it one of the longest-lived authoritarian dictatorships in modern Europe.

A political economy professor at the University of Coimbra, Salazar entered public life as finance minister with the support of President Óscar Carmona after the 28 May 1926 coup d'état. The military of 1926 saw themselves as the guardians of the nation in the wake of the instability and perceived failure of the First Republic, but they lacked the means to address the critical challenges of the hour. Armed with broad powers to restructure state finances, within one year Salazar balanced the budget and stabilised Portugal's currency, producing the first of many budgetary surpluses. In a period when authoritarian regimes elsewhere in Europe were merging political power with militarism, and leaders were adopting military titles and uniforms, Salazar enforced strict separation of the armed forces from politics. Salazar's aim was the de-politicisation of society, rather than the mobilisation of the populace.

Opposed to democracy, communism, socialism, syndicalism and liberalism, Salazar's rule was conservative, (Note: Despite that, Salazar deliberately covered up child sexual abuse by senior government officials, most notably the Ballet Rose scandal, that puts into question the extent to which this conservative ideology was truly followed) corporatist and Portuguese nationalist in nature; it was also opposed to capitalism, which it regarded as plutocratic in nature. Salazar distanced himself from Nazism and fascism, which he described as a "pagan Caesarism" that did not recognise legal, religious or moral limits. Throughout his life Salazar avoided populist rhetoric. He was generally opposed to the concept of political parties when, in 1930, he created the National Union. Salazar described and promoted the Union as a "non-party", and proclaimed that the National Union would be the antithesis of a political party. He promoted Catholicism but argued that the role of the Church was social, not political, and negotiated the Concordat of 1940 that kept the church at arm's length. One of the mottos of the Salazar regime was Deus, Pátria e Família ("God, Fatherland and Family"), although Catholicism was never the state religion. The doctrine of pluricontinentalism was the basis of Salazar's territorial policy, a conception of the Portuguese Empire as a unified state that spanned multiple continents. From the 1950s onward, during the later phase of Salazar’s rule, Portugal recorded sustained growth in GDP per capita and a decline in illiteracy. However, by the end of the Estado Novo in 1974, Portugal still had the lowest per capita income and the lowest literacy rate in Western Europe.

Salazar supported Francisco Franco in the Spanish Civil War and played a key role in keeping Portugal neutral during World War II, providing aid and assistance to the Allies, but also becoming the second receiver of Nazi gold. Despite being a dictatorship, Portugal under his rule took part in the founding of some international organisations. The country was one of the 12 founding members of the North Atlantic Treaty Organization (NATO) in 1949, joined the European Payments Union in 1950, and was one of the founding members of the European Free Trade Association (EFTA) in 1960; it was also a founding member of the Organisation for Economic Co-operation and Development in 1961. Under his rule, Portugal also became a member of the United Nations in 1955 and joined the General Agreement on Tariffs and Trade in 1961. The Portuguese Colonial War broke out in 1961, leading to the independence of Angola, Guinea-Bissau and Mozambique in 1974. The annexation of Goa by India also occurred in 1961.

With the Estado Novo enabling him to exercise vast political powers, Salazar used censorship and the PIDE secret police to quell opposition. One opposition leader, Humberto Delgado, who openly challenged Salazar's regime in the 1958 presidential election, was first exiled and became involved in several violent actions aimed at overthrowing the regime, including the hijacking of the Portuguese cruise liner Santa Maria and the Beja Revolt. These actions ultimately led to his assassination by the PIDE, in 1965. After Salazar fell into a coma in 1968, President Américo Tomás dismissed him from the position of President of the Council of Ministers. The Estado Novo collapsed during the Carnation Revolution of 1974, four years after Salazar's death.

== Background ==
=== Family ===
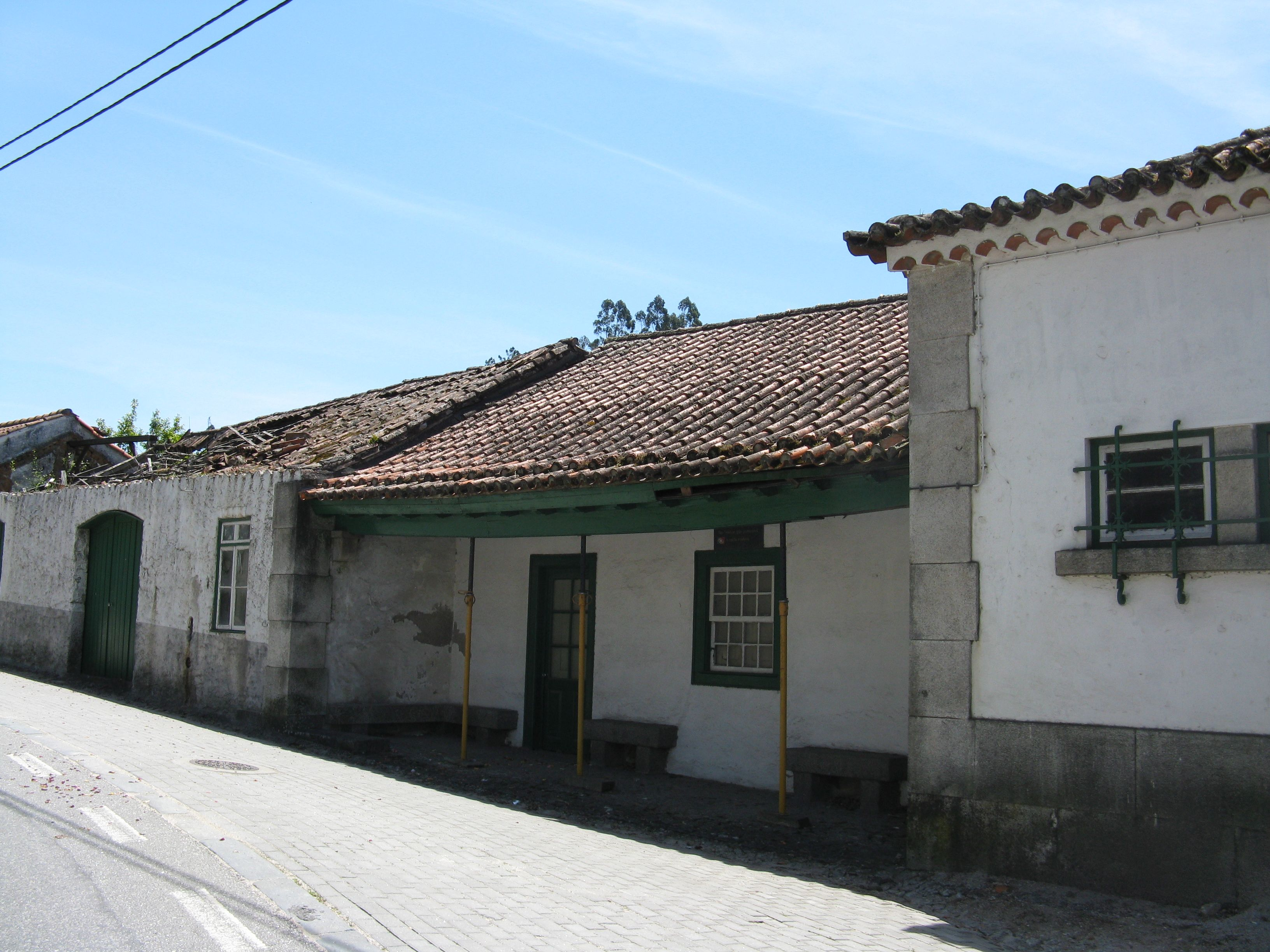
Salazar's birthplace in Santa Comba Dão

Salazar was born in Vimieiro, near Santa Comba Dão (Viseu District), to a family of modest income on 28 April 1889. His father, a small landowner, had started as an agricultural labourer and became the manager for the Perestrelos, a wealthy family of rural landowners of the region of Santa Comba Dão who possessed lands and other assets scattered between Viseu and Coimbra.

He was the only male child of two fifth cousins, António de Oliveira (1839–1932) and his wife Maria do Resgate Salazar (1845–1926). According to Portuguese naming customs, which place the mother's surname first, Salazar's name would have been "António Salazar de Oliveira" – a pattern followed by his four sisters – but, for reasons that remain unclear, (Note: Filipe Ribeiro de Meneses claims it was an accident.) the order of his surnames was reversed, and he thus became "António de Oliveira Salazar". His four older sisters were Maria do Resgate Salazar de Oliveira, an elementary school teacher; Elisa Salazar de Oliveira; Maria Leopoldina Salazar de Oliveira; and Laura Salazar de Oliveira. In 1887, Laura married Abel Pais de Sousa, brother of Mário Pais de Sousa, who served as Salazar's Interior Minister.

=== Education ===
Salazar attended the primary school in his small village and later went to another primary school in Viseu. At age 11, he won a free place at Viseu's seminary, where he studied for eight years, from 1900 to 1908. Salazar considered becoming a priest, but like many who entered the seminary very young, he decided not to proceed to the priesthood after receiving holy orders. He went to Coimbra in 1910 during the first years of the Portuguese First Republic to study law at the University of Coimbra. During these student years in Coimbra, he developed a particular interest in finance and graduated in law with distinction, specialising in finance and economic policy. He graduated in 1914, with 19 points out of 20, and in the meantime, became an assistant professor of economic policy at the Law School. In 1917, he assumed the chairs of economic policy and finance at the university by appointment of professor José Alberto dos Reis. In the following year, Salazar was awarded his doctorate.

== Politics and Estado Novo ==
=== Background ===
Salazar was twenty-one years old at the time of the revolution of 5 October 1910, which overthrew the Portuguese monarchy and instituted the First Portuguese Republic. The political institutions of the First Republic lasted until 1926, when it was replaced by a military dictatorship. This was first known as the "Ditadura Militar" (Military Dictatorship) and then, from 1928, as the "Ditadura Nacional" (National Dictatorship).

The era of the First Republic has been described as one of "continual anarchy, government corruption, rioting and pillage, assassinations, arbitrary imprisonment and religious persecution". It witnessed the inauguration of eight presidents, 44 cabinet re-organisations and 21 revolutions. The first government of the Republic lasted less than 10 weeks and the longest-ruling government lasted little over a year. Revolution in Portugal became a byword in Europe. The cost of living increased twenty-fivefold, while the currency fell to a 1/33 part of its gold value. Portugal's public finances entered a critical phase, having been under imminent threat of default since at least the 1890s. The gaps between the rich and the poor continued to widen. The regime led Portugal to enter World War I in 1916, a move that only aggravated the perilous state of affairs in the country. Concurrently, the Catholic Church was hounded by the anti-clerical Freemasons of the Republic, and political assassination and terrorism became commonplace. Between 1920 and 1925, according to official police figures, 325 bombs were detonated in the streets of Lisbon. The British diplomat Sir George Rendel said that he could not describe the "political background as anything but deplorable... very different from the orderly, prosperous and well-managed country that it later became under the government of Senhor Salazar". Salazar would keep in mind the political chaos of this time when he later ruled Portugal.

Public discontent led to the 28 May 1926 coup d'état, which was welcomed by most civilian classes. At the time, the prevailing view in Portugal was that political parties were divisive and that parliamentarianism was in crisis. This led to general support for, or at least tolerance of, an authoritarian regime.

=== Early path ===
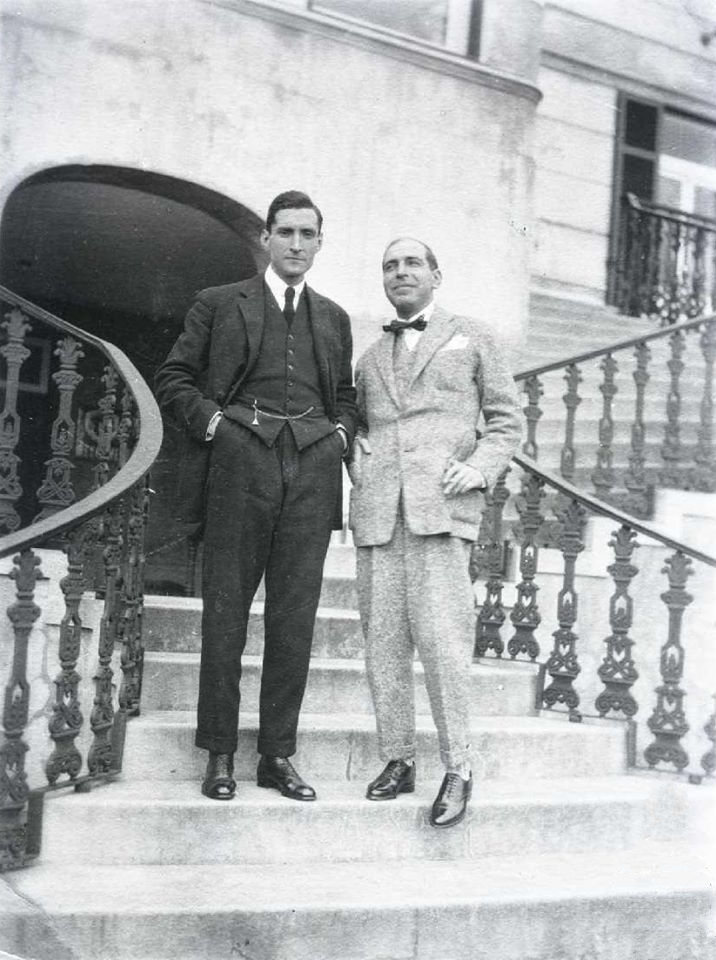
Salazar (left) in 1925

As a young man, Salazar's involvement in politics stemmed from his Catholic views, which were aroused by the First Republic's new anti-clerical stance. He became a member of the non-politically affiliated Catholic movement Centro Académico de Democracia Cristã (Academic Centre for Christian Democracy). Salazar rejected the monarchists because he felt that they were opposed to the social doctrines espoused by Pope Leo XIII to which it is said he was very sympathetic, despite the fact that they were contrary to his actions. He was a frequent contributor to journals concerned with social studies, especially the weekly O Imparcial, which was directed by his friend (and later Cardinal Patriarch of Lisbon) Manuel Gonçalves Cerejeira. Local press described him as "one of the most powerful minds of the new generation".

In 1921, Salazar was persuaded to stand as a candidate for election to parliament, though he did so reluctantly. He appeared once in the chamber and never returned, struck by the disorder he witnessed and a feeling of futility. Salazar was convinced that liberal individualism had led to fragmentation of society and a perversion of the democratic process. After the coup d'état of 28 May 1926 which established the Ditadura Nacional regime, Salazar briefly joined the government of José Mendes Cabeçadas as Minister of Finance. On 11 June, a small group of officers drove from Lisbon to Santa Comba Dão to persuade him to be Minister of Finance. Salazar spent five days in Lisbon. The conditions he proposed to control spending were refused; he quickly resigned. In two hours he was on a train back to Coimbra University, explaining that because of the frequent disputes and general disorder in the government, he could not do his work properly.

Portugal's overriding problem in 1926 was its enormous public debt, much of which was owed to foreign entities. Several times between 1926 and 1928, Salazar turned down appointment to the finance ministry. He pleaded ill-health, devotion to his aged parents and a preference for the academic cloisters. In 1927, under the ministry of Sinel de Cordes, the public deficit kept on growing. The government tried to obtain loans from Baring Brothers under the auspices of the League of Nations, but the conditions were considered unacceptable. With Portugal under the threat of an imminent financial collapse, Salazar finally agreed to become its 81st Finance Minister on 26 April 1928 after the republican and Freemason Óscar Carmona was elected president. However, before accepting the position, he personally secured from Carmona a categorical assurance that as finance minister he would have a free hand to veto expenditures in all government departments, not just his own. Within one year, armed with special powers, Salazar balanced the budget and stabilised Portugal's currency. Salazar produced the first of many budgetary surpluses.

In July 1929, Salazar again presented his resignation. His friend Mário de Figueiredo, Minister of Justice, passed new legislation that facilitated the organisation of religious processions. The new law outraged the republicans, triggered a cabinet crisis, and Figueiredo threatened to resign. Salazar advised Figueiredo against resigning but told his friend he would join him in his decision. Figueiredo did resign, and Salazar – at that time hospitalised due to a broken leg – followed suit on 3 July. Carmona went personally to the hospital on the 4th and asked Salazar to change his mind. Prime Minister José Vicente de Freitas, who took issue with Carmona's policies, left the cabinet. Salazar remained in the cabinet as Minister of Finance, but with additional powers.

Salazar stayed on as finance minister while military prime ministers came and went. From his first successful year in office, he gradually came to embody the financial and political solution to the turmoil of the military dictatorship, which had not produced a clear leader. Finally, on 5 July 1932, President Carmona appointed Salazar as the 100th prime minister of Portugal, after which he began to operate closer to the mainstream of political sentiment in his country. The authoritarian government consisted of a right-wing coalition, and he was able to co-opt the moderates of each political current with the aid of censorship and repression directed against those outside of it. Those perceived to be genuine fascists were jailed or exiled. Conservative Catholics were Salazar's earliest and most loyal supporters, whereas conservative republicans who could not be co-opted became his most dangerous opponents during the early period. They attempted several coups, but never presented a united front; consequently these attempts were easily repressed. Never a true monarchist, Salazar nevertheless gained most of the monarchists' support, as Manuel II of Portugal, the exiled and deposed last king of Portugal, always endorsed Salazar. Later, in 1932, it was due to Salazar's actions that the deposed king was given a state funeral. The National Syndicalists were torn between supporting the regime and denouncing it as bourgeois. They were granted enough symbolic concessions for Salazar to win over the moderates, but the rest were repressed by the political police.

== Prime Minister (1932–1968) ==
=== Formation of the Estado Novo ===
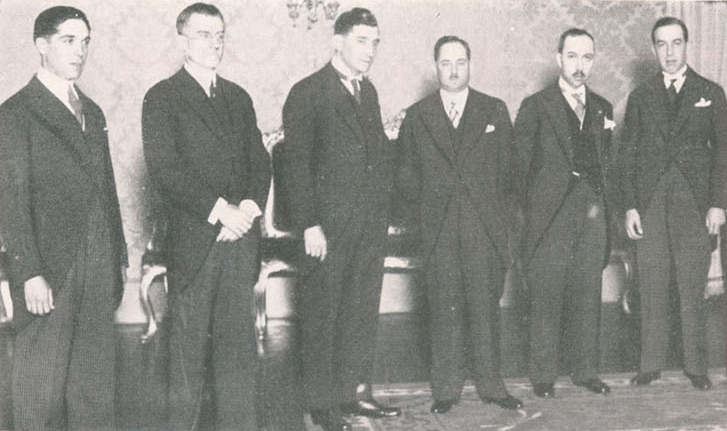
Salazar (third from the left) and his first government, formed in 1932, at Belém Palace

Salazar based his political philosophy on a close interpretation of the Catholic social doctrine, much like the contemporary regime of Engelbert Dollfuss in Austria. The economic system, known as corporatism, was alleged to be based on similar interpretations of the papal encyclicals Rerum novarum (Leo XIII, 1891) and Quadragesimo anno (Pius XI, 1931), which were meant to prevent class struggle and transform economic concerns secondary to social values. Rerum novarum argued that labor associations were part of the natural order, like the family. The right of men to organise into trade unions and to engage in collective bargaining was thus inherent and could not be denied by employers or the state. Quadragesimo anno provided the blueprint for the erection of the corporatist system. But in practice the regime's stability was maintained by suppressing political dissent.

A new constitution was drafted by a group of lawyers, businessmen, clerics and university professors, with Salazar the leading spirit and Marcelo Caetano also playing a major role. The constitution created the Estado Novo ("New State"), in theory a corporatist state representing interest groups rather than individuals. He wanted a system in which the people would be represented through corporations, rather than through political parties, and where national interest was given priority over sectional claims. Salazar thought that the party system had failed irrevocably in Portugal.

Flag of the National Union

Unlike Mussolini or Hitler, Salazar never had the intention to create a party-state. Salazar was against the whole-party concept and in 1930 he created the National Union a single-party, which he marketed as a "non-party", announcing that the National Union would be the antithesis of a political party. The National Union became an ancillary body, not a source of political power. The National Union was set up to control and restrain public opinion rather than to mobilize it; the goal was to strengthen and preserve traditional values rather than to induce a new social order. At no stage did it appear that Salazar wished it to fulfill the central role the Fascist Party had acquired in Mussolini's Italy; in fact it was meant to be a platform of conservatism, not a revolutionary vanguard. Ministers, diplomats and civil servants were never compelled to join the National Union.

Portuguese historian Ernesto C. Leal described Salazar's ideology as eclectic and syncretic, and primarily representing a combination of authoritarian nationalist, conservative and anti-liberal tendencies. According to Leal, the most unique characteristic of Salazar's political thinking was Christian corporatism and social corporatism as well as his inclusion of both reformist and traditionalist currents.

The legislature, called the Assembleia Nacional, was restricted to members of the National Union. It could initiate legislation, but only concerning matters that did not require government expenditures. The parallel Corporative Chamber included representatives of municipalities, religious, cultural and professional groups and of the official workers' syndicates that replaced free trade unions.

The new constitution introduced by Salazar established an anti-parliamentarian and authoritarian government that would last until 1974. The president was to be elected by popular vote for a period of seven years. On paper, the new document vested sweeping, almost dictatorial powers in the hands of the president, including the power to appoint and dismiss the prime minister. The president was elevated to a position of preeminence as the "balance wheel", the defender and ultimate arbiter of national politics. (Note: According to a dispatch from the British Embassy in Lisbon of that time: "Generally speaking, this novel constitution is receiving the marked approval which it deserves. It has a certain Fascist quality in its theory of 'corporations', which is a reversion to medieval from the 18th-century doctrines. But this quality, unsuited to our Anglo-Saxon tradition, is not out of place in a country which has hitherto founded its democracy on a French philosophy and found it unsuited to the national temperament". The British Embassy also pointed out that Portugal's illiteracy made elections difficult and illusory.) President Carmona, however, had allowed Salazar more or less a free hand since appointing him prime minister and continued to do so; Carmona and his successors would largely be figureheads as he wielded the true power. Howard J. Wiarda argues that Salazar achieved his position of power not just because of constitutional stipulations, but also because of his character: domineering, absolutist, ambitious, hardworking and intellectually brilliant.

The corporatist constitution was approved in the national Portuguese constitutional referendum of 19 March 1933. A draft had been published one year before, and the public was invited to state any objections in the press. These tended to stay in the realm of generalities and only a handful of people, less than 6,000, voted against the new constitution. The new constitution was approved with 99.5% of the vote, but with 488,840 abstentions (in a registered electorate of 1,330,258) counting as "yes". Hugh Kay points out that the large number of abstentions might be attributable to the fact that voters were presented with a package deal to which they had to say "yes" or "no" with no opportunity to accept one clause and reject another. In this referendum, women were allowed to vote for the first time in Portugal. Their right to vote had not been obtained during the First Republic, despite feminist efforts, and even in the referendum vote, secondary education was a requirement for female voters, whereas males only needed to be able to read and write.

The year 1933 marked a watershed in Portuguese history. Under Salazar's supervision, Teotónio Pereira, the Sub-Secretary of State of Corporations and Social Welfare, reporting directly to Salazar, enacted extensive legislation that shaped the corporatist structure and initiated a comprehensive social welfare system. This system was equally anti-capitalist and anti-socialist. The corporatisation of the working class was accompanied by strict legislation regulating business. Workers' organisations were subordinated to state control, but granted a legitimacy that they had never before enjoyed and were made beneficiaries of a variety of new social programs. Nevertheless, it is important to note that even in the enthusiastic early years, corporatist agencies were not at the centre of power and therefore corporatism was not the true base of the whole system.

==== Relationship with fascism ====
In 1934, Salazar exiled Francisco Rolão Preto as a part of a purge of the leadership of the Portuguese National Syndicalists, also known as the Camisas-azuis ("Blue Shirts"). Salazar denounced the National Syndicalists as "inspired by certain foreign models" (meaning German Nazism) and condemned their "exaltation of youth, the cult of force through direct action, the principle of the superiority of state political power in social life, [and] the propensity for organising masses behind a single leader" as fundamental differences between fascism and the Catholic corporatism of the Estado Novo. Salazar's own party, the National Union, was formed as a subservient umbrella organisation to support the regime itself, and therefore did not have its own philosophy. At the time, according to Kay, many European countries feared what he described as "the destructive potential of communism". Salazar not only forbade Marxist parties, but also revolutionary fascist-syndicalist parties. One overriding criticism of his regime is that stability was bought and maintained at the expense of suppression of human rights and liberties.

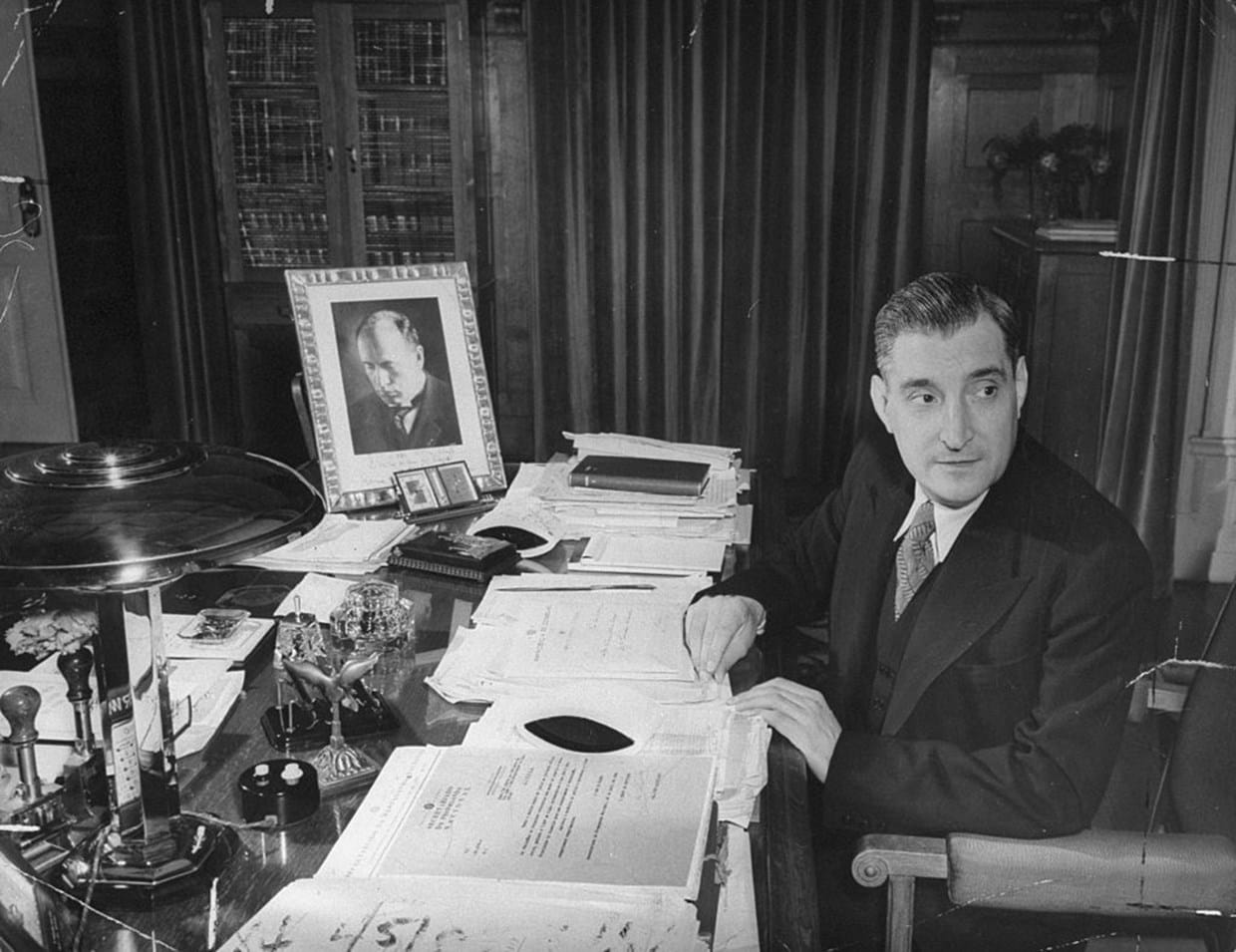
Salazar sitting at his desk with an autographed portrait of Mussolini

The corporatist state had some similarities to Italian fascism and the original corporativismo of Mussolini, but considerable differences in its moral approach to governing. Although Salazar admired Mussolini and was influenced by his Labour Charter of 1927, he distanced himself from fascist dictatorship, which he considered a pagan Caesarist political system that recognised neither legal nor moral limits. Salazar also viewed German Nazism as espousing pagan elements that he considered repugnant. Just before World War II, Salazar made this declaration:

We are opposed to all forms of Internationalism, Communism, Socialism, Syndicalism and everything that may divide or minimise, or break up the family. We are against class warfare, irreligion and disloyalty to one's country; against serfdom, a materialistic conception of life, and might over right.

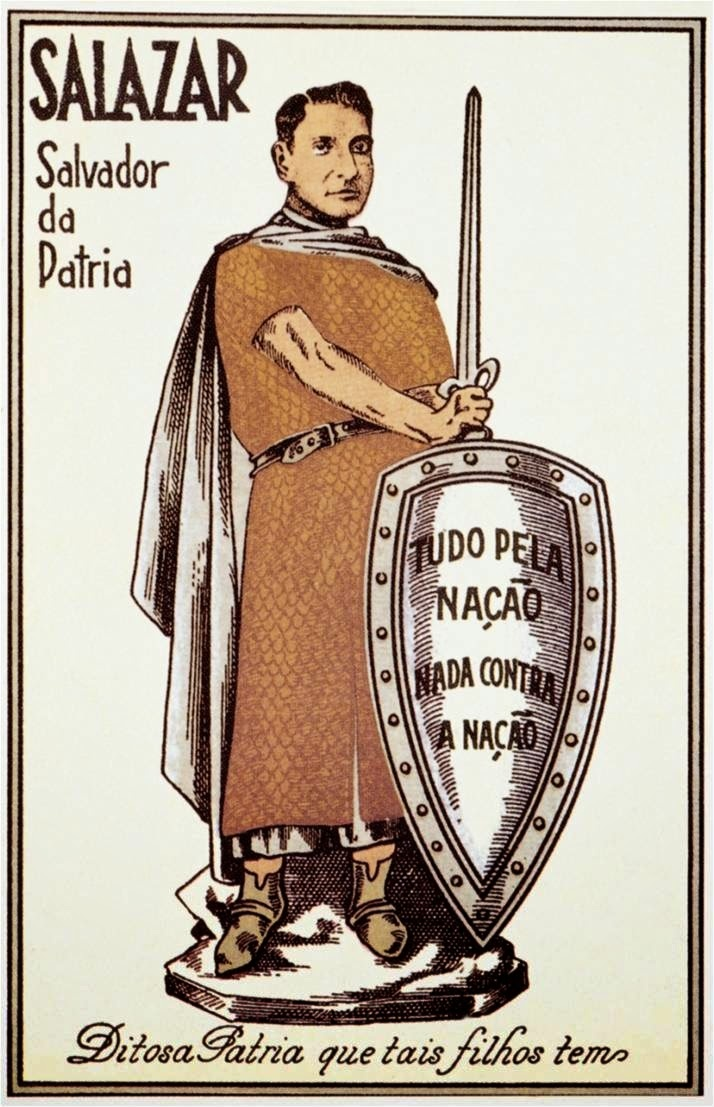
A propaganda poster depicting Salazar as King Afonso I of Portugal. The motto on the shield says "Everything for the nation, nothing against the nation" and that at the foot says "Fortunate fatherland that has such sons".

Scholars such as Stanley G. Payne, Thomas Gerard Gallagher, Juan José Linz, António Costa Pinto, Roger Griffin, Robert Paxton and Howard J. Wiarda, prefer to consider the Portuguese Estado Novo as conservative authoritarian rather than fascist. On the other hand, some Portuguese scholars like Fernando Rosas, Manuel Villaverde Cabral, Manuel de Lucena and Manuel Loff think that the Estado Novo should be considered fascist. Stanley G. Payne wrote that, "Salazar's system might best be described as one of Authoritarian Corporatism or even authoritarian corporative liberalism", rather than fascism. Historian Juan José Linz says that fascism never took roots in Salazar' Portugal The Estado Novo of Portugal differed from fascism even more profoundly than Franco's Spain. Salazar was, in effect, the dictator of Portugal, but he preferred a passive public and a limited state where social power remained in the hands of the Church, the army, and the big landowners. Samuel Hoare, the British Ambassador in Madrid during the war, stated that Salazar detested Hitler and all his works. However, he said that "Europe owes him the great service of having pushed back the frontiers of communism with astonishing energy and exciting muscle. I only fear that he will go too far in the economic and social field." And talking to a Romanian diplomat: "... in spite of everything, Hitler was a political genius, who had realized a colossal work."

Historian Robert Paxton observes that one of the main problems in defining fascism is that it was widely mimicked. He wrote, "In fascism's heyday, in the 1930s, many regimes that were not functionally fascist borrowed elements of fascist decor in order to lend themselves an aura of force, vitality, and mass mobilization." He went on to observe that Salazar "crushed Portuguese fascism after he had copied some of its techniques of popular mobilization".

Political scientists Manuel Braga da Cruz and Philippe Schmitter argue that Salazar's regime was not fascist as it lacked most aspects of fascism – unlike fascism, Salazarism had no anti-bourgeois or anti-capitalist motivations, there was no determination of the state apparatus by an armed party, and loyalty to Salazar "was more a case of condescending obedience than enthusiastic support on the part of subordinates". Da Cruz and Schmitter also note that Salazarism was marked by nationalist and conservative policies rather than expansionist ambitions. Additionally, Howard J. Wiarda observes that Salazar did not pursue genocidal policies, and while Salazar's Portugal was marked by political repression, it gradually "became less repressive and eventually opened up somewhat, not to liberalism, but to greater pluralism and less strict controls".

According to Juan José Linz, Salazar's Portugal was "an authoritarian regime with its own distinctive politics and dynamics" that was neither fascist nor totalitarian. In Sandey's analysis of the regime, they makes following points:

- "While Portugal did not allow completely unrestricted interest group pluralism (liberalism), it did not completely snuff them out (totalitarianism).
- Salazar did not allow all ideas to compete (liberalism) but neither did he have a totalitarian ideology like fascism; instead he had a "mentality" (discipline, order, conservatism, Catholicism), which he believed in but did not seek to spread by forced indoctrination, as totalitarianism did.
- Both liberal and totalitarian regimes try to mobilize their populations (the latter by force) to participate in politics; Salazar in contrast relied more on apathy, indifference and the de-politicization of the population from earlier frenetic activity.
- Concerning political parties, while democratic politics are competitive, and totalitarianism entails total dominance by a single party, Portugal had a large political patronage machine that served some but limited purposes (not determining the whole fabric of government).
- Salazar was not a Messianic leader like Mussolini; he was not a particularly good public speaker, shunned mass rallies and was not charismatic.
- Salazar did not pursue genocidal politics involving the slaughter of masses of people." (408)

=== Securing the regime ===
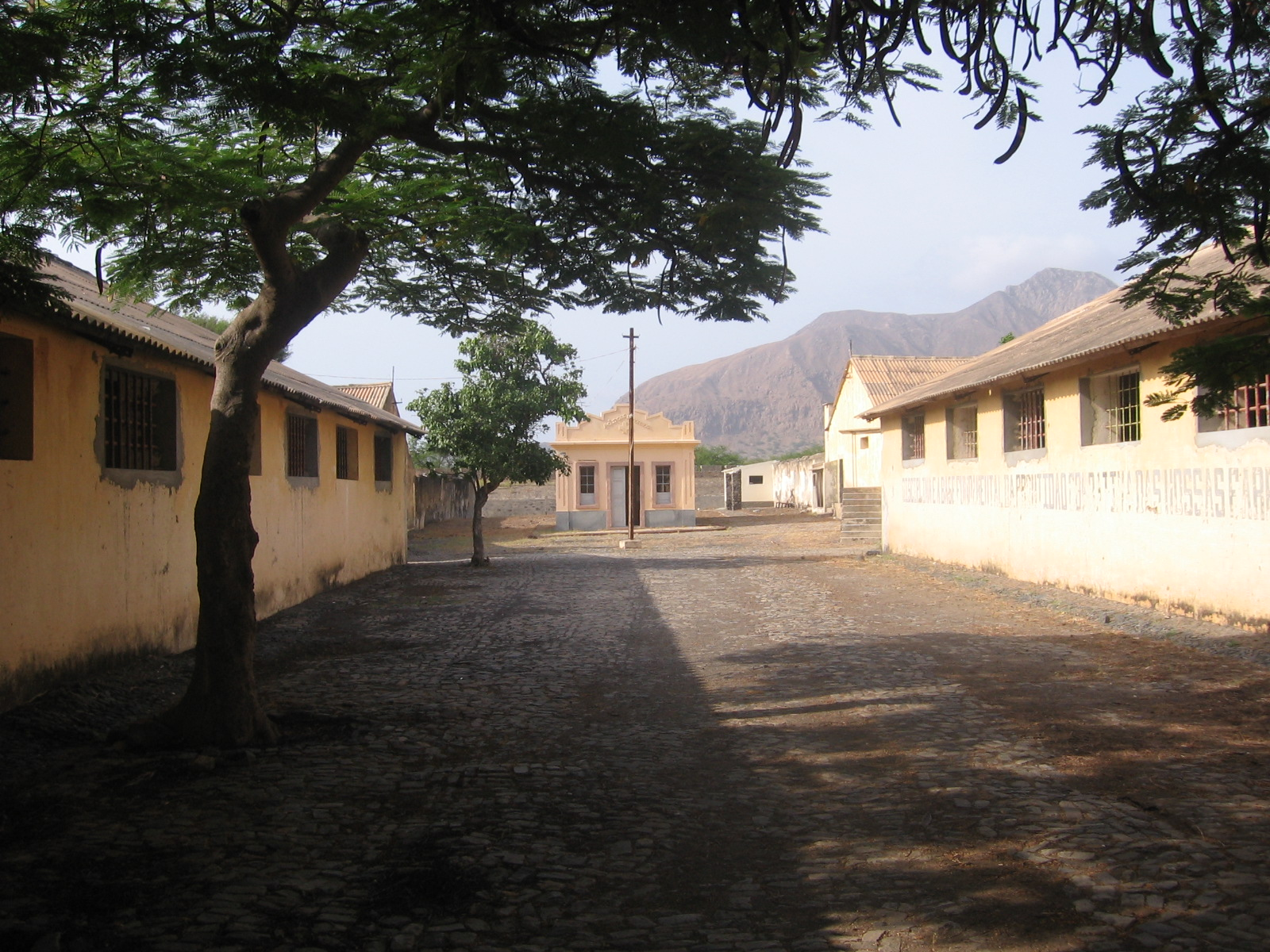
Tarrafal concentration camp

Salazar relied on secret police to enforce the policies he wished to implement. The Polícia de Vigilância e Defesa do Estado ("State Surveillance and Defense Police") was established in 1933. It was replaced in 1945 by the remodeled Polícia Internacional e de Defesa do Estado (PIDE) ("International and State Defence Police"), which lasted until 1969 (and from that year to 1974 under Marcelo Caetano, it was the Direção-Geral de Segurança (DGS) ("General Security Directorate"). The secret police existed not only to protect national security in a modern sense, but also to monitor the population, apply censorship, and suppress the regime's political opponents, especially those associated with the international communist movement or the Soviet Union.

Political prisoners were incarcerated in detention centers, such as the Caxias prison, near Lisbon, or the Tarrafal camp, on the Cabo Verde islands, and tortured. The political police used a net of civilian informants, in popular parlance "bufos", who were found in practically all sectors of society.

In the PIDE headquarters in Lisbon, a five-storey building on António Maria Cardoso Street, a phrase of Salazar's was written: "We will mourn the dead, if the living don't deserve it". Until 1971, when interrogations took place in the southern stronghold of Caxias, it was there that many opponents of the regime were subjected to beatings and torture. It was a city area, in the middle of Lisbon's downtown, and the screams could be heard in the street. On August 1, 1958, the Brazilian ambassador herself (Álvaro Lins' wife) witnessed a detainee fall from the third floor of the political police headquarters.

==== Spanish Civil War ====
The Spanish Civil War, which began in July 1936, was the ostensible reason for the radicalisation of the regime. Internally, the regime had to face a monarchist revolt in 1935, a threatened leftist coup in 1936 and several bombs and conspiracies in 1936 and 1937, including an attempt to assassinate Salazar in 1937. At the same time, Spanish Republican agents were active in Lisbon and Spanish troops were deployed on Portugal's vulnerable border, severely threatening Portuguese sovereignty.

At the beginning of the Spanish Civil War, Salazar took up additional portfolios as minister of war and minister of foreign affairs, while retaining direction of the ministry of finance, thus concentrating even more power in his hands.

Salazar supported Francisco Franco and the Nationalists in their war against the Republican forces, as well as the anarchists and the communists. The Nationalists lacked access to seaports early on, so Salazar's Portugal helped them receive armaments shipments from abroad, including ordnance when certain Nationalist forces virtually ran out of ammunition. Consequently, the Nationalists called Lisbon "the port of Castile". Later, Franco spoke of Salazar in glowing terms in an interview in the Le Figaro newspaper:

The most complete statesman, the one most worthy of respect, that I have known is Salazar. I regard him as an extraordinary personality for his intelligence, his political sense and his humility. His only defect is probably his modesty.

On 8 September 1936, a naval revolt took place in Lisbon. The crews of two naval Portuguese vessels, the Afonso de Albuquerque and the Dão, mutinied. The sailors, who were affiliated with the Communist Party, confined their officers and attempted to sail the ships out of Lisbon to join the Spanish Republican forces fighting in Spain. Salazar ordered the ships to be destroyed by gunfire. The following day, loyalty oaths became mandatory for all members of the civil service and censorship was severely tightened. Every government functionary was forced to declare that he repudiated communism. This crusade aimed to root out not only communists but also the democratic opposition. The convicted sailors from the 1936 naval revolt were the first to be sent to the Tarrafal prison camp established by Salazar in the Cape Verde Islands to house political prisoners. It was labeled the "slow death camp" where dozens of political prisoners (mostly communists, but also adherents of other ideologies), were imprisoned under inhumane unhealthy conditions in exceedingly hot weather and died. Historians say that 60 people died in jails for political reasons during Salazar's nearly 40-year regime.

In January 1938, Salazar appointed Pedro Teotónio Pereira as special liaison of the Portuguese government to Franco's government, where he achieved great prestige and influence. In April 1938, Pereira officially become a full-rank Portuguese ambassador to Spain, and he remained in this post throughout World War II.

Just a few days before the nationalist victory in the Spanish Civil War, on 17 March 1939, Portugal and Spain signed the Iberian Pact, a non-aggression treaty that marked the beginning of a new phase in Iberian relations. Meetings between Franco and Salazar played a fundamental role in this new political arrangement. The pact proved to be a decisive instrument in keeping the Iberian Peninsula out of Hitler's continental system.

==== Assassination attempt ====
The decisive conservatism of the regime naturally drew opposition. Emídio Santana, founder of the Sindicato Nacional dos Metalúrgicos ("National Syndicate of Metallurgists") and an anarcho-syndicalist who was involved in clandestine activities against the dictatorship, attempted to assassinate Salazar on 4 July 1937. Salazar was on his way to Mass at a private chapel in a friend's house on Barbosa du Bocage Avenue in Lisbon. As he stepped out of his Buick limousine, a bomb hidden in an iron case exploded only 3 metres (10 ft) away. The blast left Salazar untouched, but his chauffeur was rendered deaf. An inept secret police made several arrests and beat five innocent people till they confessed.

A year later, the bishops of the country argued in a collective letter that it was an "act of God" that had preserved Salazar's life. The official car was replaced by an armoured Chrysler Imperial. Sought by the PIDE, Emídio Santana fled to Britain, where he was arrested by British police and returned to Portugal. He was then sentenced to 16 years in prison.

=== World War II ===
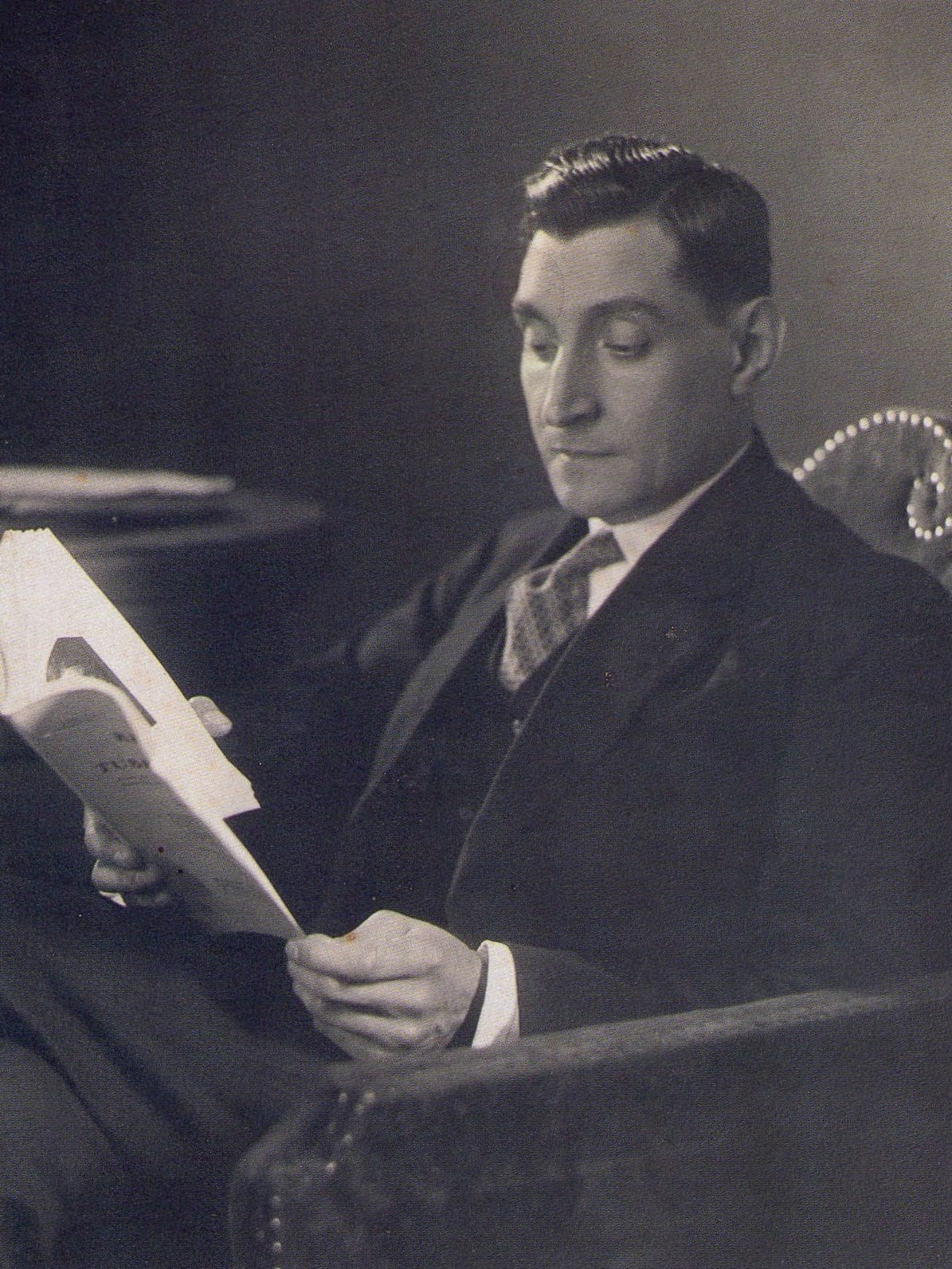
Salazar in 1940

Salazar had experienced the social turmoil caused by World War I, in which Portugal participated during the period of the First Republic; World War II followed its course while he was in power. Salazar was widely praised for keeping Portugal neutral. From the war's very beginning in 1939, Salazar was convinced that Britain would suffer injury, but remain undefeated, that the United States would step into the conflict and that the Allies would win. The American journalist Henry J. Taylor commented, "I found not another continental European leader who then agreed with him".

==== Neutrality ====
In 1934, several years before the war began, Salazar clarified in an official speech that Portuguese nationalism did not include "the pagan ideal and anti-human to deify a race or empire", and again, in 1937, Salazar published a book in which he criticised the Nuremberg Laws passed in 1935 in Germany, considering it regrettable that German nationalism was "wrinkled by racial characteristics so well marked", which had imposed "the legal point of view, the distinction between citizens and the subject – and this at the risk of dangerous consequences". Salazar thought, regarding World War II, that "a German victory spelt disaster for the rule of law and for peripheral, agricultural, countries such as Portugal." Salazar's dislike of the Nazi regime in Germany and its imperial ambitions was tempered only by his view of the German Reich as a bastion against the spread of Communism rather than an allied nation. He had favoured the Spanish nationalist cause out of fear of a Communist invasion of Portugal, yet he was uneasy at the prospect of a Spanish government bolstered by strong ties with the Axis powers.

Salazar's policy of neutrality for Portugal in World War II thus included a strategic component. The country still held colonies that Portugal could not defend from military attack. Siding with the Axis would have brought Portugal into conflict with Britain, likely resulting in the loss of its colonies, while siding with the Allies risked the security of the home country on the mainland. A conflict with Britain would have been economically costly, as Portugal relied on British transports of goods from Portuguese colonies to the mainland. As the price to pay for remaining neutral, Portugal continued to export tungsten and other commodities to both the Axis (via Switzerland, partly) and the Allied countries. On 1 September 1939, at the start of World War II, the Portuguese Government announced that the 600-year-old Anglo-Portuguese Alliance remained intact, but that since the British did not seek Portuguese assistance, Portugal was free to remain neutral in the war and would do so. In an aide-mémoire of 5 September 1939, the British Government confirmed the understanding.

==== Responses ====
British strategists regarded Portuguese non-belligerency as "essential to keep Spain from entering the war on the side of the Axis". Britain recognised Salazar's important role on 15 May 1940, when Douglas Veale, Registrar of the University of Oxford, informed him that the university's Hebdomadal Council had "unanimously decided at its meeting last Monday, to invite you [Salazar] to accept the Honorary Degree of Doctor of Civil Law". In September 1940, Winston Churchill wrote to Salazar to congratulate him for his policy of keeping Portugal out of the war, avowing that "as so often before during the many centuries of the Anglo-Portuguese alliance, British and Portuguese interests are identical on this vital question." Sir Samuel Hoare, the British Ambassador in Madrid from 1940 to 1944, recognised Salazar's crucial role in keeping Iberia neutral during World War II, and lauded him for it. Hoare averred that "Salazar detested Hitler and all his works" and that his corporative state was fundamentally different from a Nazi or fascist state, with Salazar never leaving a doubt of his desire for a Nazi defeat. (Note: Hoare asserted that, in his 30 years of political life, he had met most of the leading statesmen of Europe, and regarded Salazar very highly among those. Salazar was to him a learned and impressive thinker, part professor, part priest, part recluse of unshakable beliefs in the principles of European civilisation. He regarded him as ascetic, concentrated on serving his country, with an encyclopedic knowledge of Europe, and indifferent to ostentation, luxury or personal gain. Hoare strongly believed in Salazar as "being a man of one idea – the good of his country – not wanting to endanger the work of national regeneration to which he had devoted the whole of his public life.") Historian Carlton Hayes, a pioneering specialist on the study of nationalism, was the American Ambassador in Spain during the war. He met Salazar in person and also praised him, expressing a similar opinion to Hoare's in his book Wartime Mission in Spain. (Note: Hayes wrote of Salazar, claiming he "didn't look like a regular dictator. Rather, he appeared a modest, quiet, and highly intelligent gentleman and scholar ... literally dragged from a professorial chair of political economy in the venerable University of Coimbra a dozen years previously in order to straighten out Portugal's finances, and that his almost miraculous success in this respect had led to the thrusting upon him of other major functions, including those of Foreign Minister and constitution-maker.") In November 1943, the British Ambassador in Lisbon, Sir Ronald Campbell, wrote, paraphrasing Salazar, that "strict neutrality was the price the allies paid for strategic benefits accruing from Portugal's neutrality and that if her neutrality instead of being strict had been more benevolent in our favour Spain would inevitably have thrown herself body and soul into the arms of Germany. If this had happened the Peninsula would have been occupied and then North Africa, with the result that the whole course of the war would have been altered to the advantage of the Axis."

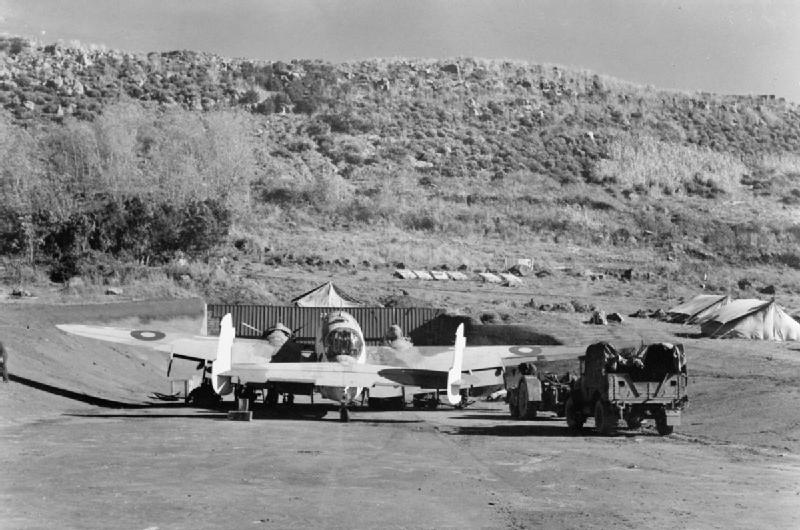
Royal Air Force Coastal Command in the Azores during World War II

Sir Ronald Campbell saw Salazar as fundamentally loyal to the Anglo-Portuguese Alliance. When in May 1943, in the Third Washington Conference, codenamed Trident, the conferees agreed on the occupation of the Azores (Operation Alacrity) the British Ambassador reacted to the US State Department's suggestion as "particularly ill-timed and incomprehensible at the present juncture". He recalled that at the outset of the war, Salazar had remained neutral with British approval and stated that "he [Salazar] would answer the call if it were made on grounds of dire necessity". The British Ambassador was correct, and when in August 1943 the British requested military base facilities in the Azores, invoking the alliance, Salazar responded favourably and quickly: Portugal allowed these bases, letting the British use the Azorean ports of Horta (on the island of Faial) and Ponta Delgada (on the island of São Miguel), and the airfields of Lajes Field (on Terceira Island) and Santana Field (on São Miguel Island). From November 1943, when the British gained use of the Azores, to June 1945, 8,689 US aircraft departed from Lajes, including 1,200 B-17 and B-24 bomber aircraft ferried across the Atlantic. Cargo aircraft carried vital personnel and equipment to North Africa, to the United Kingdom and – after the Allies gained a foothold in Western Europe – to Orly Field near Paris. Flights returning from Europe carried wounded servicemen. Medical personnel at Lajes handled approximately 30,000 air evacuations en route to the United States for medical care and rehabilitation. Use of Lajes Field reduced flying time between Brazil and West Africa from 70 hours to 40, a considerable reduction that enabled aircraft to make almost twice as many crossings, clearly demonstrating the geographic value of the Azores during the war. The British diplomat Sir George Rendell stated that the Portuguese Republican Government of Bernardino Machado was "far more difficult to deal with as an ally during the First War than the infinitely better Government of Salazar was as a neutral in the Second".

==== Refugees ====
The principal reason for the neutrality of Portugal in World War II was strategic, and within the compass of the overall objectives of the Anglo-Portuguese Alliance. This modest, but complex role allowed Portugal to rescue a large number of war refugees.

Portugal's official nationalism was not grounded in race or biology. Salazar argued that Portuguese nationalism did not glorify a single race because such a notion was pagan and anti-human. In 1937, he published a book entitled Como se Levanta um Estado (How to Raise a State), in which he criticised the philosophical ideals behind Nazi Germany's Nuremberg laws In 1938, he sent a telegram to the Portuguese Embassy in Berlin, ordering that it should be made clear to the German Reich that Portuguese law did not allow any distinction based on race, and that therefore, Portuguese Jewish citizens could not be discriminated against. In the previous year, Adolfo Benarus, Honorary Chairman of COMASSIS (Note: Portuguese Committee for the Assistance of Jewish Refugees in Portugal (COMASSIS), which was led by Augusto d´Esaguy and Elias Baruel, having Moses Amzalak and Adolfo Benarus as its honorary chairmen.) and a leader of the Lisbon's Jewish community, published a book in which he applauded the lack of anti-Semitism in Portugal. The honorary president of the Jewish community of Lisbon, claimed in 1937 that "happily in Portugal, modern anti-Semitism doesn't exist". In 2011, Avraham Milgram, Yad Vashem historian, said that modern anti-Semitism failed "to establish even a toehold in Portugal", while it grew virulently elsewhere in early 20th-century Europe.

On 12 June 1940, Salazar issued instructions to the Portuguese consulates in France to provide Infanta Marie Anne of Portugal, Grand Duchess of Luxembourg and Infanta Maria Antónia of Portugal, Duchess of Parma with Portuguese passports. With these Portuguese passports the entire entourage of the royal families could get visas without creating problems to the neutrality of the Portuguese government. This way Zita of Bourbon-Parma and her son Otto von Habsburg got their visas because they were descendants of Portuguese citizens. Following the German annexation of Austria, Otto was sentenced to death by the Nazi regime.

On 13 June, Salazar had to act fast again, this time to support the Belgian royal family. Salazar sent instructions to the Portuguese Consulate in Bayonne saying the "Portuguese territory is completely open" to the Belgian royal family and its entourage.

On 26 June 1940, four days after France's capitulation to Germany, Salazar authorised the Hebrew Immigrant Aid Society (HIAS-HICEM) in Paris to transfer its main office to Lisbon. This authorization was done against the will of the British Embassy in Lisbon. The British feared that this would make the Portuguese people less sympathetic with the allied cause. According to the Lisbon Jewish community, Salazar held Moisés Bensabat Amzalak, the leader of the Lisbon Jewish community, in high esteem, and allowed Amzalak to play an important role in getting Salazar's permission for the transfer.

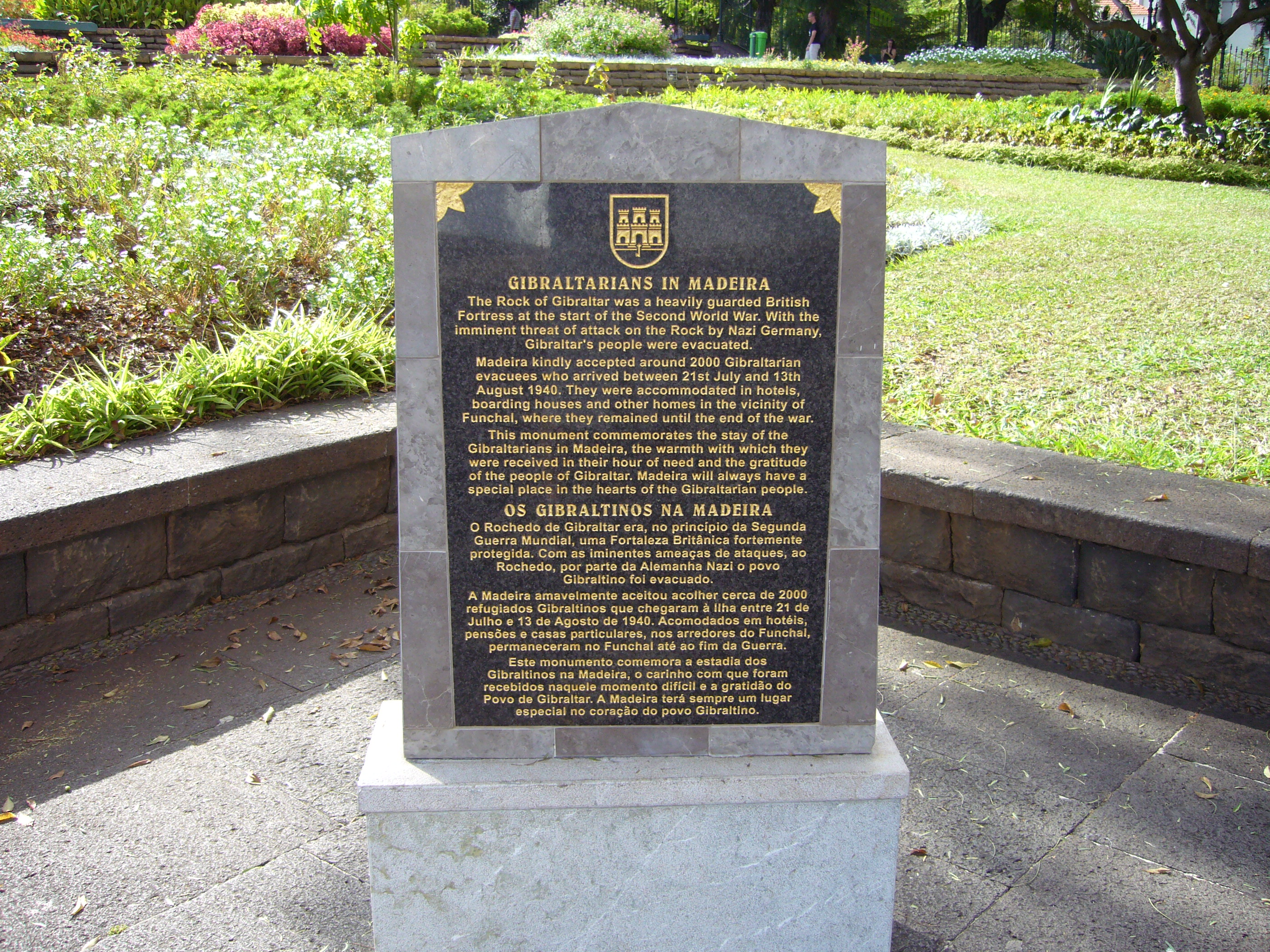
Memorial commemorating Gibraltarian evacuees on Madeira

In July 1940, the civilian population of Gibraltar was evacuated due to imminent attacks expected from Nazi Germany. At that time, Portuguese Madeira agreed to host about 2,500 Gibraltarian refugees, mostly women and children, who arrived at Funchal between 21 July and 13 August 1940 and remained there until the end of the war.

Portugal, particularly Lisbon, was one of the last European exit points to the US, (Note: At the conclusion of the film Casablanca (1942), Ingrid Bergman and her husband escape to Lisbon en route to the US in one of the most memorable film scenes. Star-crossed Humphrey Bogart and Ingrid Bergman part as he sends her off into the foggy night to join her husband on a flight from Casablanca. Bogart (Rick) sacrifices the life they might have had together to ensure her safety.) and a large number of refugees found shelter in Portugal. The Portuguese consul general in Bordeaux, Aristides de Sousa Mendes, helped several, and his actions were not unique by any means. Issuing visas in contravention of instructions was widespread at Portuguese consulates all over Europe, although some cases were supported by Salazar. The Portuguese Ambassador in Budapest, Carlos Sampaio Garrido, helped large numbers of Hungarian Jews who came to the Portuguese diplomatic mission in 1944 seeking Portuguese protection. On 28 April 1944, the Gestapo raided the ambassador's home and arrested his guests. The ambassador, who physically resisted the police, was also arrested, but managed to have his guests released on the grounds of extraterritoriality of diplomatic legations. In 2010, Garrido was recognised as Righteous Among the Nations by Yad Vashem.

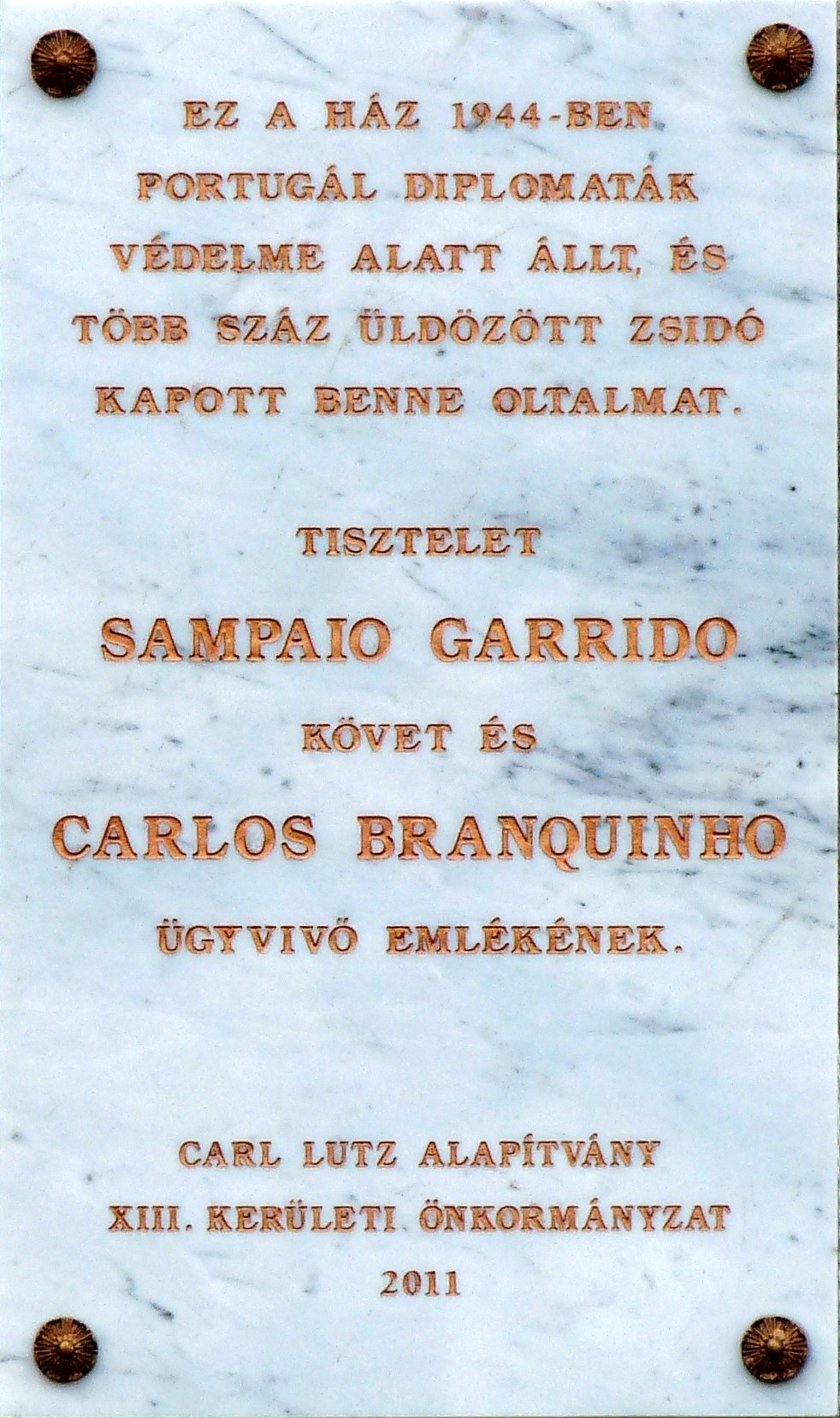
Commemorative plaque to Mr. Carlos Sampaio Garrido, Portugal's ambassador and Mr. Teixeira Branquinho, chargé d'affaires in mission to Budapest in 1944 who managed to rescue some thousands of Hungarian Jews from the Holocaust (Budapest, District XIII, Újpesti Quay Nr 5)

Following the German occupation of Hungary, in response to a request from Britain and the United States who wanted neutral countries to downgrade their diplomatic presence in Hungary, Salazar recalled Garrido and left the chargé d'affaires, Carlos de Liz-Teixeira Branquinho in his place. Branquinho, in close coordination with Salazar, issued protective passports to hundreds of Jewish families and risked his life renting houses and apartments to shelter and protect the refugees from deportation and murder. Branquinho saved an estimated 1,000 Hungarian Jews. Branquinho's case differs from that of Sousa Mendes in at least three respects. He was deliberately setting out to save Jews, he had the full backing of the authorities in Lisbon, and was in the heart of a Nazi regime, in 1944, when the Holocaust was at its peak, while Sousa Mendes was at Bordeaux in 1940. Branquinho's name has been engraved in the Raoul Wallenberg-memorial at the Dohány Street Synagogue in Budapest, but in Portugal he remains largely unknown. Branquinho was finally recalled to Lisbon on 30 October 1944. Tom Gallagher argues that Branquinho's case has been largely overlooked, probably because he was coordinating his actions with Salazar, which weakens the core argument in the Sousa Mendes' legend that he was defying a tyrannical superior. Gallagher argues that the disproportionate attention given to Sousa Mendes suggests that wartime history is in danger of being used in contemporary Portugal as a political weapon. Gallagher is not alone in classifying as disproportionate the attention given to Sousa Mendes' episode; the Portuguese historian Diogo Ramada Curto also thinks that "the myth of an Aristides who opposed Salazar and capable of acting individually, in isolation, is a late invention that rigorous historical analysis does not confirm."

Other Portuguese who deserve credit for saving Jews during the war include Professor Francisco de Paula Leite Pinto and Moisés Bensabat Amzalak. A devoted Jew and a supporter of Salazar, Amzalak headed the Lisbon Jewish community for 52 years, from 1926 until 1978. In 1943, Amzalak and Leite Pinto, under Salazar's supervision, initiated a rescue mission. Francisco de Paula Leite Pinto, at that time the General Manager of the Beira Alta Railway, which operated the line from Figueira da Foz to the Spanish frontier, organized several trains that brought refugees from Berlin and other European cities to Portugal. Amzalak was also able to persuade Salazar to instruct consuls in territories under Nazi occupation to validate all passports held by Jews, even though these documents were known to be far from "kosher".

Large numbers of political dissidents, including Abwehr personnel, sought refuge in Portugal after the plot of 20 July 1944 to assassinate Adolf Hitler. Until late 1942, immigration was very restricted. In cases in which refugees were suspected to desire not simply to pass through Portugal in transit to their destination, but rather intended to remain in the country, the consulates needed to get a previous authorization from Lisbon. This was frequently the case with foreigners of indefinite or contested nationality, stateless individuals, Russians, and Jews expelled from their countries of origin.

The number of refugees who escaped through Portugal during the war has been estimated to range from a few hundred thousand to one million, large numbers considering the size of the country's population of about 6 million at that time. After the war, Portugal kept on welcoming and supporting refugees. In an operation organised by Caritas Portugal from 1947 to 1952, 5,500 Austrian children, most of them orphans, were transported by train from Vienna to Lisbon and then sent to the foster care of Portuguese families.

Among the many refugees accepted into Portugal for political and religious asylum, Miklós Horthy, the war-time leader of Hungary, who had participated alongside the Germans, was granted asylum status. In 1950, the Horthy family managed to find a home in Portugal, thanks to Miklós Jr.'s contacts with Portuguese diplomats in Switzerland. Horthy and members of his family were relocated to the seaside town of Estoril, in the house address Rua Dom Afonso Henriques, 1937 2765.573 Estoril.

==== Maintaining the regime ====
In October 1945, Salazar announced a liberalisation program designed to restore civil rights that had been suppressed during the Spanish Civil War and World War II in hopes of improving the image of his regime in Western circles. The measures included parliamentary elections, general political amnesty, restoration of freedom of the press, curtailment of legal repression and a commitment to introduce the right of habeas corpus. The opposition started to organise itself around a broad coalition, the Movement of Democratic Unity (MUD), which ranged from ultra-Catholics and fringe elements of the extreme right to the Portuguese Communist Party. Initially, the MUD was controlled by the moderate opposition, but soon became strongly influenced by the Communist Party, which controlled its youth wing. In its leadership were several communists, among them Octávio Pato, Salgado Zenha, Mário Soares (later President), Júlio Pomar and Mário Sacramento. This influence led the MUD to be outlawed by the government in 1948 after several waves of suppression. Restrictions on civil liberties that had been temporarily lifted were then gradually reinstated.

As the Cold War started, Salazar's Estado Novo remained rigidly authoritarian. Salazar had been able to hold onto power by virtue of the public's recollection of the chaos that had characterised Portuguese life before 1926. However, by the 1950s, a new generation emerged that had no collective memory of this instability. The clearest sign of this came in the Portuguese presidential election of 1958. Most neutral observers believed that the candidate of the democratic opposition, Humberto Delgado, would have defeated the candidate of the Salazar regime, Américo Tomás, had the election been conducted fairly. Delgado was well aware that the president's power to sack the prime minister was theoretically the only check on Salazar's power, and stated that if elected, his first policy would be to dismiss Salazar. Delgado was able to rally support from a wide range of opposition viewpoints. Among his supporters were some controversial figures, namely the press campaign manager Francisco Rolão Preto, a former Nazi sympathiser and former leader of the Blue Shirts, arrested and exiled by the regime in the 1930s. Official figures credited Delgado with one-fourth of the votes, in total approximately a million – well behind Tomás. Although the electoral system was so heavily rigged that Tomás could not possibly have been defeated, Salazar was alarmed by the episode. Leaving nothing to chance, he pushed through a constitutional amendment transferring election of the president to the two parliamentary bodies, which were both firmly under his control. Delgado was expelled from the Portuguese military and took refuge in the Brazilian embassy before going into exile. Much of his banishment was spent in Brazil and later in Algeria, as a guest of Ahmed Ben Bella. Later, in 1965, he was lured into an ambush by the PIDE near the border town of Olivenza and killed, alongside his Brazilian secretary Arajaryr Moreira de Campos. An official statement claimed that Delgado was shot and killed in self-defence, despite Delgado being unarmed; de Campos' body bore marks of strangulation.

=== Electoral results ===
Party	Salazar's position	Year	% won of total valid votes	Votes (including invalid)	% turnout
União Nacional	Prime Minister	1934	100	476,706	80.2
União Nacional	Prime Minister	1938	100	694,290	83.7
União Nacional	Prime Minister	1942	100	758,215	86.6
União Nacional	Prime Minister	1945	100	489,133	53.8
União Nacional	Prime Minister	1949	100	927,264	75.8
União Nacional	Prime Minister	1953	100	845,281	68.2
União Nacional	Prime Minister	1957	100	911,618	70.4
União Nacional	Prime Minister	1961	100	973,997	74.0
União Nacional	Prime Minister	1965	100	998,542	73.6

=== Colonial policies ===
During the last years of the monarchy and of the First Republic in Portugal, an attempt was made to obtain firmer control over the claimed African possessions. One reason the government dragged itself into World War I was the defence of the African empire, considered a part of the national identity.

Portuguese colonies in Africa during the Estado Novo (1933–1974): Angola and Mozambique were by far the largest territories

Salazar briefly served as minister of colonies before assuming the premiership, and in that capacity he prepared the Colonial Act of 1930, which centralised the administration of the colonies in his own system and proclaimed the need to bring indigenous peoples into western civilisation and the Portuguese nation. Assimilation was the main objective, except for the Atlantic colony of Cape Verde (which was seen as an extension of Portugal), the Indian colonies, and Macau (which were seen as having their own forms of "civilization"). As it had been before Salazar's tenure in the office, a clear legal distinction continued to be made between indigenous peoples and other citizens – the latter mostly Europeans, some Creole elites, and a few black Africans. A special statute was given to native communities to accommodate their tribal traditions. In theory, it established a framework that would allow natives to be gradually assimilated into Portuguese culture and citizenship, while in reality the percentage of assimilated African population never reached one per cent.

In 1945, Portugal still had an extensive colonial empire that encompassed Cape Verde, São Tomé and Príncipe, Angola (including Cabinda), Guinea Bissau, and Mozambique in Africa; India in South Asia; and Macau and East Timor in the Far East. Salazar wanted Portugal to be relevant internationally, and the country's overseas colonies made that possible.

In 1947, Captain Henrique Galvão, a Portuguese parliamentarian, submitted a report disclosing the situation of forced labor and precarious health services in the Portuguese colonies of Africa. The natives, it said, were simply regarded as beasts of burden. Galvão's report led to his downfall; in 1952, he was arrested for allegedly subversive activities. Although the Estatuto do Indigenato ('Indigenous Statute') set standards for indigenes to obtain Portuguese citizenship until it was abolished in 1961, the conditions of the native populations of the colonies were still harsh, and they suffered inferior legal status under its policies. Under the Colonial Act, African Natives could be forced to work. By requiring all African men to pay a tax in Portuguese currency, the government created a situation in which a large percentage of men in any given year could only earn the specie needed to pay the tax by going to work for a colonial employer. In practice, this enabled settlers to use forced labor on a massive scale, frequently leading to horrific abuses.

Following the Second World War, unlike the other European colonial powers, Salazar attempted to resist this tide of decolonization and maintain the integrity of the empire.

In order to justify Portugal's colonial policies and Portugal's alleged civilising mission, Salazar ended up adopting Gilberto Freyre's theories of Lusotropicalism, which maintained that the Portuguese had a special talent for adapting to environments, cultures, and the peoples who lived in the tropics in order to build harmonious multiracial societies. This view was criticized by Charles R. Boxer, a British historian of colonial empires. (Note: For a critical look at the theory of lusotropicalism see for instance "Angola under the Portuguese: The Myth and the Reality" by Gerald J. Bender, a Professor in the School of International Relations at the University of Southern California in Los Angeles and a former member of the Board of Directors of the African Studies Association (U.S.A.) from 1979 to 1987.)

Most of Salazar's political opponents (with the exception of the Portuguese Communist Party) also strongly favoured colonialist policies. This was the case with João Lopes Soares (father of Mário Soares), who had been minister of colonies, General Norton de Matos, the leader of the opposition supported by Mário Soares (Note: Norton de Matos, who had been governor-general of Angola during the First Republic, published a book in 1953 titled África Nossa (Our Africa) wherein he defended colonialist policies far more aggressive than those of Salazar and supported the idea of massive territorial occupation by Portuguese white settlers.) and António Sérgio, a prominent Salazar opponent.

Salazar's reluctance to travel abroad, his increasing determination not to grant independence to the colonies, and his refusal to grasp the impossibility of his regime outliving him marked the final years of his tenure. "Proudly alone" was the motto of his final decade. For the Portuguese ruling regime, the overseas empire was a matter of national identity.

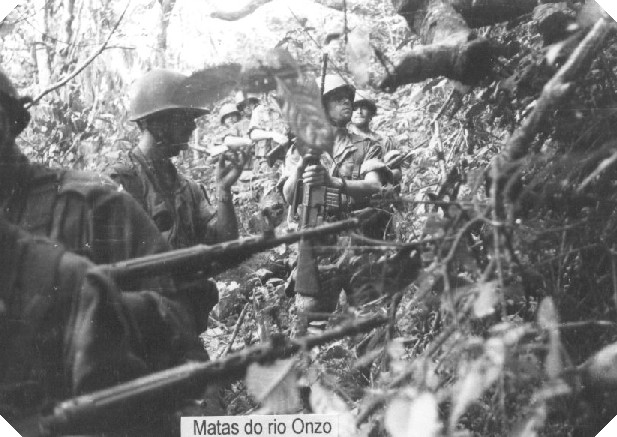
Portuguese soldiers on patrol in Angola

In the 1960s, armed revolutionary movements and scattered guerrilla activity reached Mozambique, Angola, and Guinea. Except in Guinea, the Portuguese army and naval forces were able to suppress most of these insurgencies effectively through a well-planned counter-insurgency campaign using light infantry, militia, and special operations forces. However, despite the early military successes, Colonel Francisco da Costa Gomes quickly pointed out that there could be no permanent military solution for Portugal's colonial problem. In 1961, General Júlio Botelho Moniz, after being nominated Minister of Defense, tried to convince President Tomás in a constitutional "coup d'état" to remove an aged Salazar from the premiership. Botelho Moniz ended up being removed from his government position. His political ally da Costa Gomes was nonetheless allowed to publish a letter in the newspaper Diário Popular reiterating his view that a military solution in Africa was unlikely.

In the 1960s, most of the world ostracised the Portuguese government because of its colonial policy, especially the newly independent African nations. Domestically, factions within Portugal's elite, including business, military, intellectuals and the church started to challenge Salazar and his policies. Later, despite tentative overtures towards an opening of the regime, Caetano balked at ending the colonial war, notwithstanding the condemnation of most of the international community. The Carnation Revolution brought retreat from the colonies and acceptance of their independence, the subsequent power vacuum leading to the inception of newly independent communist states in 1975, notably the People's Republic of Angola and the People's Republic of Mozambique, which promptly began to expel all of their white Portuguese citizens. As a result, over a million Portuguese became destitute refugees – the retornados. The Portuguese Colonial War resulted in more than 100,000 civilian deaths and more than 10,000 Portuguese soldiers dead.

==== Goa dispute ====
Of the colonies remaining to Portugal at the end of World War II, Goa was the first to be "lost", in 1961. A brief conflict drew a mixture of worldwide praise and condemnation for Portugal. In India, the action was seen as a liberation of territory historically Indian by reason of its geographical position, while Portugal viewed it as an aggression against its national soil and its own citizens.

After India gained independence on 15 August 1947, the British and French vacated their colonial possessions in the new country. Subsequently, Prime Minister Jawaharlal Nehru initiated proceedings to find a diplomatic solution to the Goa problem. The Portuguese had been in Goa since 1510, while an independent India had only just been established. Nehru argued that the Goans were Indians by every standard and that Goa was a colony ruthlessly administered by a racist and fascist colonial regime, "just a pimple on the face of India", in his famous phrase. Salazar maintained that in spite of Goa's location and the nature of Portugal's political system, it was a province of Portugal as integral to his nation as the Algarve. Salazar further asserted that Goans nowhere considered or called themselves Indians, but rather deemed themselves to be Portuguese of Goa and that Goans were represented in the Portuguese legislature; indeed, some had risen to the highest levels of government and the administration of Portuguese universities. The Goans had Portuguese citizenship with full rights, thus access to all governmental posts and the ability to earn their living in any part of the Portuguese territories.

Throughout the debate between Salazar and Nehru, many Goans seem to have been apathetic regarding either position, and there were no signs in Goa of discontentment with the Portuguese regime. Reports from Times correspondents suggested that not only were the residents of Goa unexcited by the prospect of Indian sovereignty, but that even the diaspora was less energised than the Indian government was prone to suggest. Contrary to what these politically motivated sources suggest, Goa did have a vigorous and well-established anti-colonial movement led by prominent figures such as Tristão de Bragança Cunha with ties to the Indian National Congress

With an Indian military operation imminent, Salazar ordered Governor General Manuel Vassalo e Silva to fight to the last man and adopt a scorched earth policy.

Eventually, India launched Operation Vijay in December 1961 to evict Portugal from Goa, Daman and Diu. 31 Portuguese soldiers were killed in action, and the Portuguese Navy frigate NRP Alfonso de Albuquerque was destroyed, before Vassalo e Silva surrendered. Salazar forced the general into exile for disobeying his order to fight to the last man and surrendering to the Indian Army.

Support and opposition to India's action was on expected lines. Statements of support came from the Arab states, newly independent Ceylon and Indonesia, Yugoslavia, and the Soviet Union and Soviet bloc countries. Statements deploring India's resort to force in Goa, Daman, and Diu were primarily made by countries with overseas colonies, including the United Kingdom, France, the Netherlands, Spain, and some other Western countries notably the United States, Canada and Australia, apart from regional rivals China and Pakistan.

==== Aid to Rhodesia ====
Salazar was a close friend of Rhodesian Prime Minister Ian Smith. After Rhodesia proclaimed its Unilateral Declaration of Independence from Britain in 1965, Portugal supported it economically and militarily through neighbouring Mozambique until 1975, even though it never officially recognised the new Rhodesian state, which was governed by a white minority elite. In 1975, the Mozambican Liberation Front took over the rule of Mozambique following negotiations with the new Portuguese regime installed by the Carnation Revolution. Smith later wrote in his biography The Great Betrayal that had Salazar lasted longer than he did, the Rhodesian government would have survived to the present day, ruled by a black majority government under the name of Zimbabwe Rhodesia.

=== International relations after World War II ===
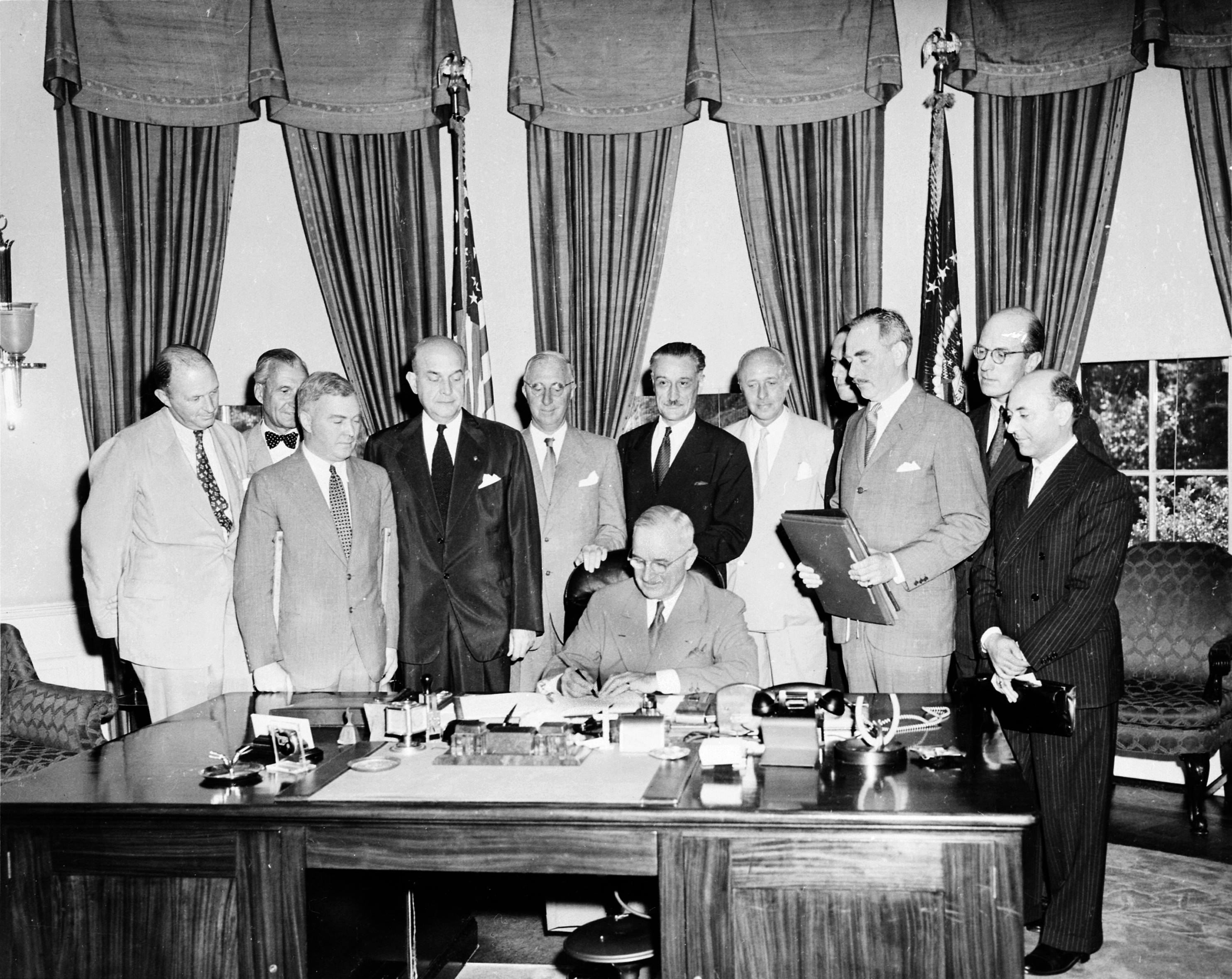
President Truman signing the North Atlantic Treaty with Portuguese Ambassador Teotónio Pereira standing behind

Despite the authoritarian character of the regime, Portugal did not experience the same levels of international isolation as Spain did following World War II. Unlike Spain, Portugal under Salazar was accepted into the Marshall Plan (1947–1948) in return for the aid it gave to the Allies during the final stages of the war. Furthermore, also unlike Spain, it was one of the 12 founding members of the North Atlantic Treaty Organization (NATO) in 1949, a reflection of Portugal's role as an ally against communism during the Cold War in spite of its status as the only non-democratic founder. In 1950, Portugal joined the European Payments Union and participated in the founding of the European Free Trade Association (EFTA) in 1960 and the Organisation for Economic Co-operation and Development in 1961. It joined the United Nations in 1955. It joined the General Agreement on Tariffs and Trade in 1962, and finally, Portugal signed a free trade agreement with the European Economic Community in 1972, still under the auspices of the Estado Novo.

=== Education and literacy rates ===
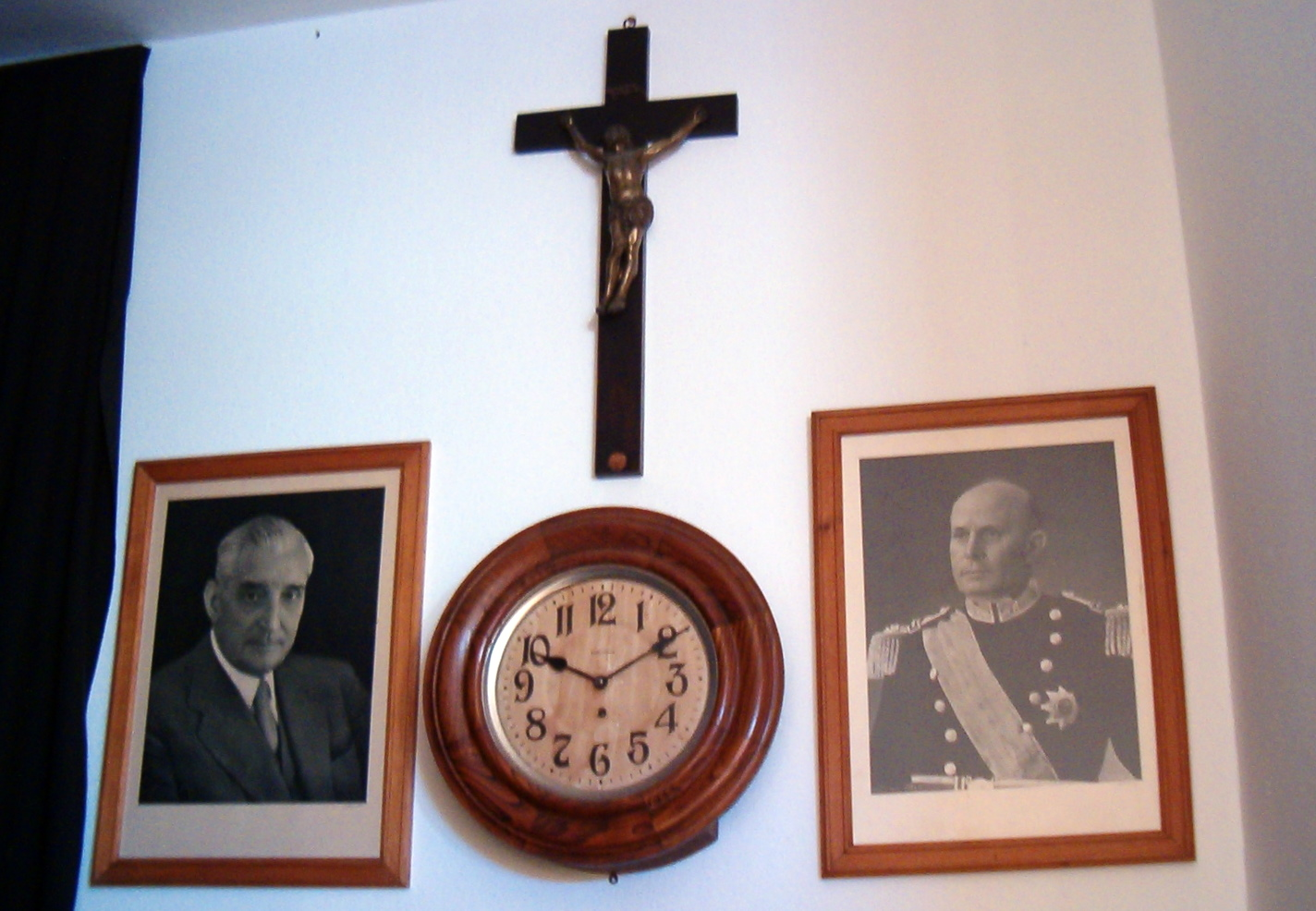
Required elements of primary schools during the Estado Novo: a crucifix and portraits of Salazar and Américo Tomás

Although the militants of the First Republic had chosen education as one of their banner causes, the evidence shows that First Republic was less successful than the authoritarian Estado Novo in expanding elementary education. Under the First Republic, literacy levels in children aged 7 to 14 registered a modest increase from 26% in 1911 to 33% in 1930. Under the Estado Novo, literacy levels in children of the same age group increased to 56% in 1940, 77% in 1950 and 97% in 1960.

Under Salazar the number of elementary schools grew from 7,000 in 1927 to 10,000 in 1940. While the illiteracy rate under the twenty years of the First Republic had only dropped a modest 9%, under Salazar in twenty years, the illiteracy rate dropped 21%, from 61.8% in 1930 to 40.4% in 1950. In 1940, the regime celebrated the fact that for the first time in Portuguese History, the majority of the population could read and write.

In 1952, a vast multi-pronged "Plan for Popular Education" was launched with the intent of finally extirpating illiteracy and putting into school every child of school age. This plan included fines for parents who did not comply, and these were strictly enforced. By the late 1950s, Portugal had succeeded in pulling itself out of the educational abyss in which it had long found itself: illiteracy among children of school age virtually disappeared. However, by the end of the Estado Novo regime in 1974, Portugal still had the lowest literacy rate in Western Europe.

Literacy Rate	1900	1911	1920	1930	1940	1950	1960
Children aged 7–14	20%	26%	31%	33%	56%	77%	97%

In the 1960s, Portugal founded universities in the overseas provinces of Angola and Mozambique (the University of Luanda and the University of Lourenço Marques). In 1971, it recognised the Portuguese Catholic University, and by 1973 founded several state-run universities across mainland Portugal (the Minho University, the New University of Lisbon, the University of Évora, and the University of Aveiro). In addition, the long-established universities of Lisbon and Coimbra were greatly expanded and modernised. New buildings and campuses were constructed, such as the Cidade Universitária (Lisbon) and the Alta Universitária (Coimbra).

The last two decades of the Estado Novo, from the 1960s to the 1974 Carnation Revolution were marked by strong investment in secondary and university education, which experienced one of the fastest growth rates of Portuguese education in history.

=== Economic policies ===
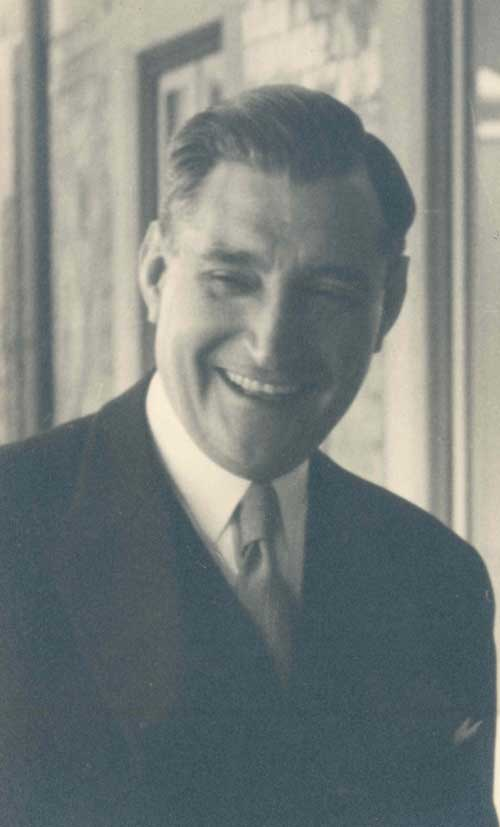
Salazar, aged 50, in 1939

After the politically unstable and financially chaotic years of the Portuguese First Republic, financial stability was Salazar's highest priority. His first incursions into Portuguese politics as a member of the cabinet were during the Ditadura Nacional, when Portugal's public finances were in a critical state, with an imminent threat of default since at least the 1890s. After Salazar became prime minister, he levied numerous taxes to balance the Portuguese budget and pay external debts. Salazar's first years were marked by the Great Depression and the Second World War. The first era of his rule was thus an economic program based on the policies of autarky and interventionism, which were popular in the 1930s as a response to the Great Depression. Under Salazar, the Portuguese budget went from insolvency to showing a substantial surplus every year from 1928. Portugal's credit worthiness rose in foreign markets and the external floating debt was completely paid.

However, Portugal remained largely underdeveloped, its population relatively poor and with low education attainment when compared to the rest of Europe.

Conservative Portuguese scholars such as Jaime Nogueira Pinto and Rui Ramos claim that Salazar's early reforms and policies allowed political and financial stability, therefore social order and economic growth. On the other hand, historians such as the leftist politician Fernando Rosas claim that Salazar's policies from the 1930s to the 1950s led to economic and social stagnation and rampant emigration that turned Portugal into one of the poorest countries in Europe.

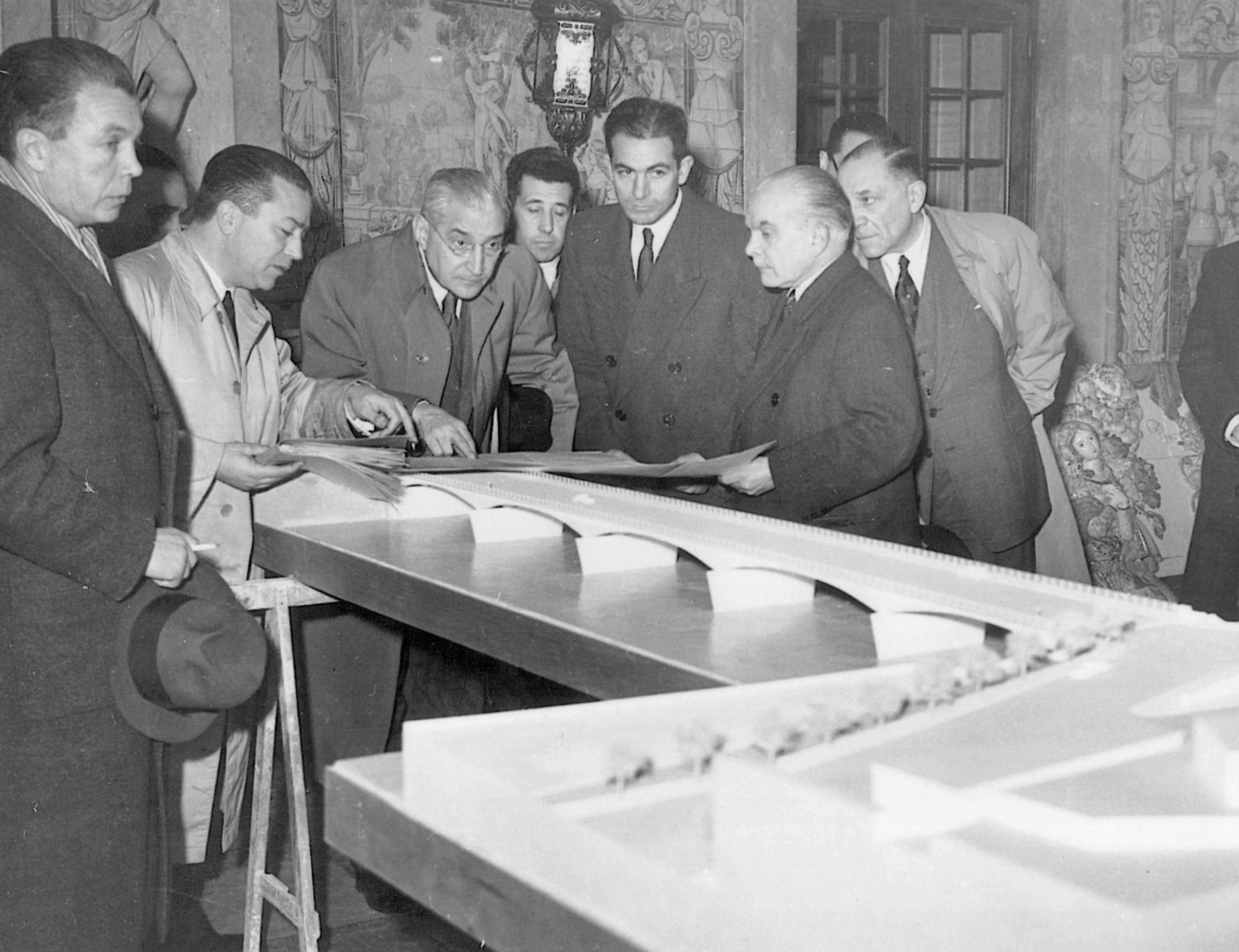
Salazar (fourth from the left) observing Edgar Cardoso's model of the new Santa Clara bridge in Coimbra

Throughout the 1950s, Salazar maintained the same import substitution approach to economic policy that had ensured Portugal's neutral status during World War II. From 1950 until Salazar's death, Portugal saw its GDP per capita increase at an annual average rate of 3.7%. The rise of new technocrats in the early 1960s with a background in economics and technical-industrial expertise led to a new period of economic fostering, with Portugal as an attractive country for international investment. Industrial development and economic growth would continue throughout the 1960s. During Salazar's tenure, Portugal participated in the founding of the EFTA in 1960 and the OECD in 1961. In the early 1960s, Portugal also added its membership in the GATT, the International Monetary Fund (IMF), and the World Bank. This marked the initiation of Salazar's more outward-looking economic policy. Portuguese foreign trade increased by 52% in exports and 40% in imports. The economic growth and levels of capital formation from 1960 to 1973 were characterised by an unparalleled robust annual growth rates of GDP (6.9%), industrial production (9%), private consumption (6.5%) and gross fixed capital formation (7.8%).

Despite the effects of an expensive war effort in African territories against guerrilla groups, Portuguese economic growth from 1960 to 1973 under the Estado Novo created an opportunity for real integration with the developed economies of Western Europe. In 1960, after nearly 30 years of Salazar's rule, Portugal's per capita GDP was only 38% of the European Community (EC-12) average; by the end of Salazar's rule in 1968, it had risen to 48%; and in 1973, under the leadership of Caetano, Portugal's per capita GDP had reached 56.4% of the EC-12 average.

=== Religious policies ===
For forty years, Portugal was governed by a man that had been educated at a seminary, had received minor orders, and had considered becoming a priest. Before accepting the office of minister of finance, Salazar had been associated with several Catholic movements and had developed a very close friendship with Manuel Gonçalves Cerejeira, who in 1929 would become Cardinal-Patriarch of Lisbon. During their university years at Coimbra they shared a house and expenses, in an old convent known as "Os Grilos" and were cared for by a young maid, Maria de Jesus, who later followed Salazar to Lisbon.

In July 1929, with Salazar acting as minister of finance, the government revoked a law that had facilitated the organisation of religious processions. Salazar presented his written resignation to the prime minister saying, "Your Excellency knows that I never asked for anything that might improve the legal status of Catholics". He carefully avoided adding more problems to an already troubled nation, but he could not accept the "violation of rights already conceded by law or by former government to Catholics or the Church in Portugal".

Christ the King, Almada

Despite his identification with the Catholic lobby before coming to power and the fact that he supposedly based his political philosophy around a close interpretation of the Catholic social doctrine, he did not implement any direct change to strengthen the presence of Catholicism in Portugal in the initial phase of his rule. He wanted to avoid the divisiveness of the First Republic, and he knew that a significant part of the political elite was still anti-clerical. Church and State remained apart. No attempt was made to establish a theocratic policy. The Church's lost property was never restored.

In 1932, Salazar declared the Portuguese Catholic Centre to be unnecessary, since all political parties were to be suppressed, and he "invited" its members to join his own political organization, the National Union. The role of the Church should be social and not political, he argued. In reaction, Cardinal-Patriarch Cerejeira founded Acção Católica Portuguesa in 1933 and continued to agitate for political power until 1934, when Pope Pius XI told Cerejeira that he should focus on social, not political, issues. In the Portuguese Constitution of 1933, Article 45 provided for freedom of public and private worship for all religions, together with the right to establish Church organizations and associations "in accordance with the norms of law and order".

Salazar allegedly based his political theory on the doctrines of the popes and throughout the 1930s achieved great prestige in the Catholic world. In 1936, the episcopate expressed its full support for the regime in a Carta Pastoral, reaffirmed the following year by the head of the Portuguese Catholic Church. Pope Pius XII said of him: "I bless him with all my heart, and I cherish the most ardent desire that he be able to complete successfully his work of national restoration, both spiritual and material". In 1938, Fordham University, a university founded by the Catholic Diocese of New York, granted Salazar the Honorary Doctorate of Law. Salazar wanted to reinstate the Church to its proper place, but also wanted the Church to know its place and keep it. He made it clear when he declared, "The State will abstain from dealing in politics with the Church and feels sure that the Church will refrain from any political action." And he added: "It must be so, because politicaI activity corrupts the Church."

In May 1940, a Concordat between the Portuguese state and the Vatican was signed. There were difficulties in the negotiations that preceded its signing; the Church remained eager to re-establish its influence, whereas Salazar was equally determined to prevent any religious intervention within the political sphere, which he saw as the exclusive preserve of the State. The legislation of the parliamentary republic was not fundamentally altered: religious teaching in schools remained voluntary, while civil marriages and civil divorce were retained and religious oaths were not re-established. The Bishops were to be appointed by the Holy See, but final nomination required the government's approval. The clergy were subject to military service, but in the form of pastoral care to the armed forces and, in time of war, also to the medical units. The Church could establish and maintain private schools, but they would be subject to state supervision. The Catholic religion and morality were to be taught in public schools unless parents had requested the contrary. Catholics who celebrated canonical marriages were not allowed to obtain a civil divorce. The law stated that "It is understood that by the very fact of the celebration of a canonical marriage, the spouses renounce the legal right to ask for a divorce." Despite this prohibition, nearly 91% of all marriages in the country were canonical marriages by 1961. (Note: Salazar's concordat outlived him and outlived the Estado Novo by 30 years; a new one was signed by Prime Minister José Manuel Barroso in 2004. Salazar's text was slightly amended in 1975 in order to allow civil divorce in Catholic marriages, while keeping all the other articles in force. (Additional Protocol to the 1940 Concordat, Decreto n.º 187/75, Signed by President Francisco da Costa Gomes))

Pinto and Rezola argue that a key strategy Salazar used to stabilise his regime was to come to terms with the Catholic Church through the Concordat. Anti-clericalism would be discouraged and the Church would have an honored and central position in Portuguese life. The Church agreed to stay out of politics, but it did operate numerous social groups for adults and youth. The Church role became a major pillar of the New State's "limited pluralism".

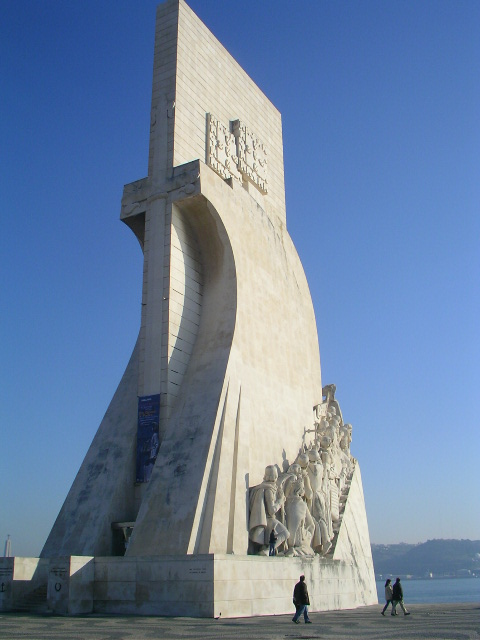
The entrance profile of the Monument to the Discoveries in Lisbon, displaying the cross of Aviz as a stylised sword, symbolising the growth of the empire and faith

Despite this landmark agreement, Church-state relations and inter-Church relations in Portugal were not without some tensions through the 1940s. Some prominent oppositionist priests, such as Abel Varzim and Joaquim Alves Correia, openly supported the MUD in 1945 and the granting of more social rights to the workers. Abel Varzim, who had been a supporter of the regime, attacked Salazar and his claims of the Catholicism of the corporatist state, arguing that the regime was not true to Catholic social teaching as the people suffered in poverty. Varzim's newspaper, O Trabalhador (The Worker), was closed in 1948. In his personal diary he wrote: "o estado-salazar é quem manda na igreja" ("In Portugal the Salazar–State rules the church"). Joaquim Alves Correia was forced into exile in the United States, where he died in 1951. The opposition candidate in the 1958 presidential election, Humberto Delgado, a Roman Catholic and a dissident of the regime, quoted Pope Pius XII to show how the social policies of the regime were against the social teachings of the Church. That same year, in July 1958, Salazar suffered a severe blow from the bishop of Porto, Dom António Ferreira Gomes, who wrote a critical letter to the Council President criticizing the restrictions on human rights and denouncing the harshness of Portugal's poverty. It was time, he said, for the Church to come out of the catacombs and speak its mind. Salazar was furious. The bishop was not formally exiled, but he decided to leave the country, and it appears that Lisbon made it clear to Rome that the bishop's presence in Portugal would not be appropriate.

After the Second Vatican Council, a large number of Catholics became active in the democratic opposition. The outbreak of the colonial wars in Angola, Guinea and Mozambique – in March 1961, January 1963 and September 1964 respectively – exacerbated the divisions within the Catholic sector along progressive and traditionalist lines. The pope's decision to travel to Bombay in December 1964 to take part in the Eucharistic Congress represented for the Portuguese head of government – who saw in India little more than the illegal occupier of Goa since December 1961 – no less than a direct affront to the nation as a whole. On 21 October 1964, the Minister of Foreign Affairs, Alberto Franco Nogueira, officially defined the visit as an agravo gratuito.

Directly linked with the pope's visit to India, a second event of significant importance preceded the pope's visit to Portugal: the attribution of the Golden Rose to the Fátima sanctuary on 13 May 1965. Paul VI officially announced his intention to take part in the Fiftieth Anniversary celebrations of the first reported Fátima apparition – also the twenty-fifth of the consecration of the world to the Immaculate Heart of Mary by Pius XII – during his General Audience of 3 May 1967. From the very start, he made every effort to remove any political significance from his visit. It was effectively limited to a single day in Fátima, not Lisbon, and the pope made use of Monte Real Air Base instead of Lisbon airport, which would have given a far more official nature to the pilgrimage.

Religions other than the Catholic faith had little or no expression in Portugal. Throughout the period of Salazar's Estado Novo there was no question of discrimination against the Jewish and Protestant minorities, and the ecumenical movement flourished.

== Downfall ==
=== Health breakdown and removal ===
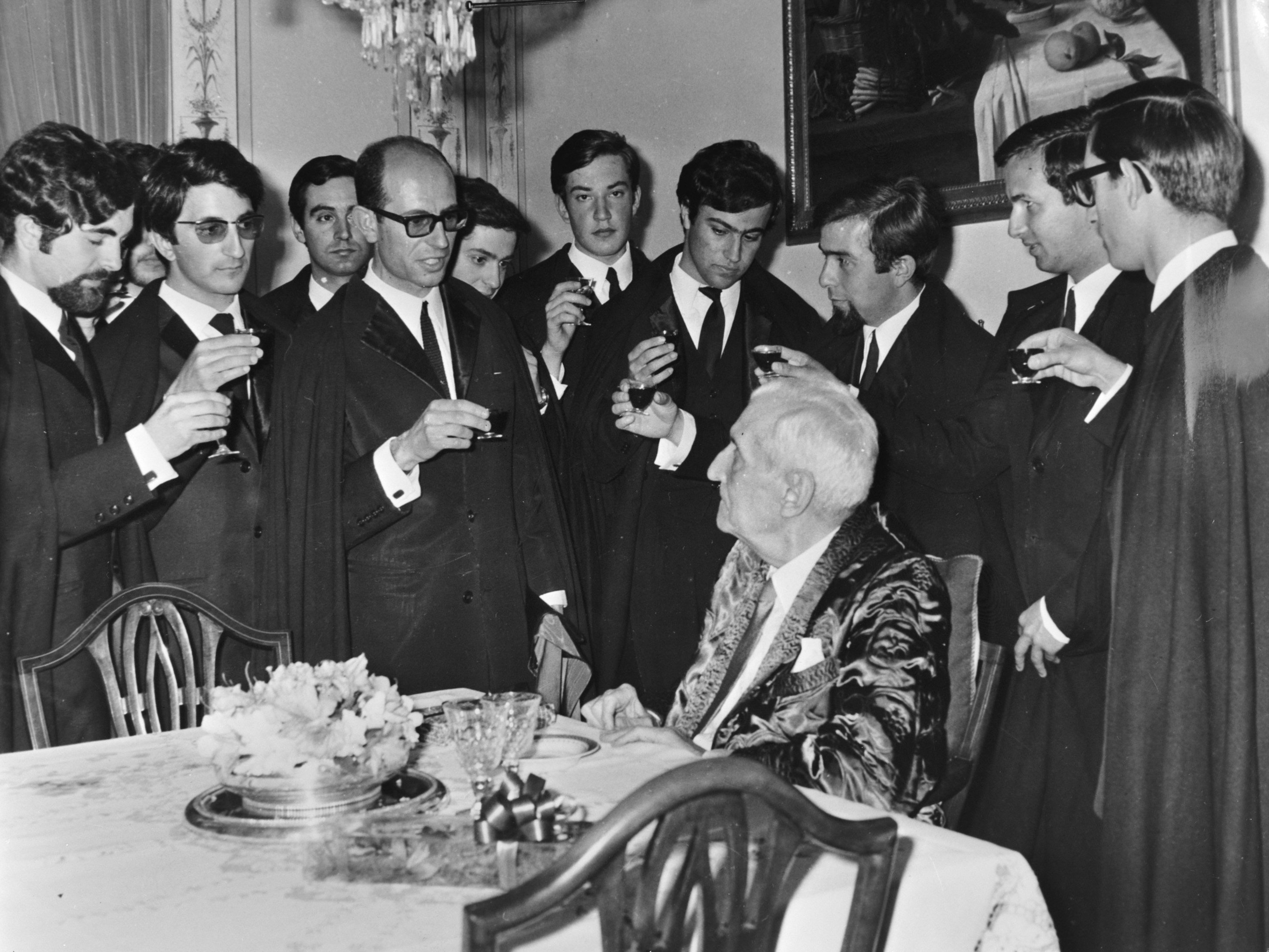
An aged Salazar and a group of academic students three months after being discharged from the hospital in 1969

In August 1968, Salazar suffered a cerebral hemorrhage on his right hemisphere. Most sources maintain that it was caused by a fall from a chair on 3 August in his summer house in the Fort of Santo António da Barra. In February 2009, there were anonymous witnesses who admitted, after some investigation into Salazar's best-kept secrets, that he had fallen in a bath instead of from a chair.

After the incident, Salazar's life went on normally. Sixteen days later, Salazar admitted he felt sick and he was admitted to São José Hospital two days later. On 16 September, he went into a coma. With Salazar incapacitated, President Tomás considered that the 79-year-old prime minister would die soon; on 25 September, he dismissed Salazar and replaced him with Marcelo Caetano.

=== Death and funeral ===
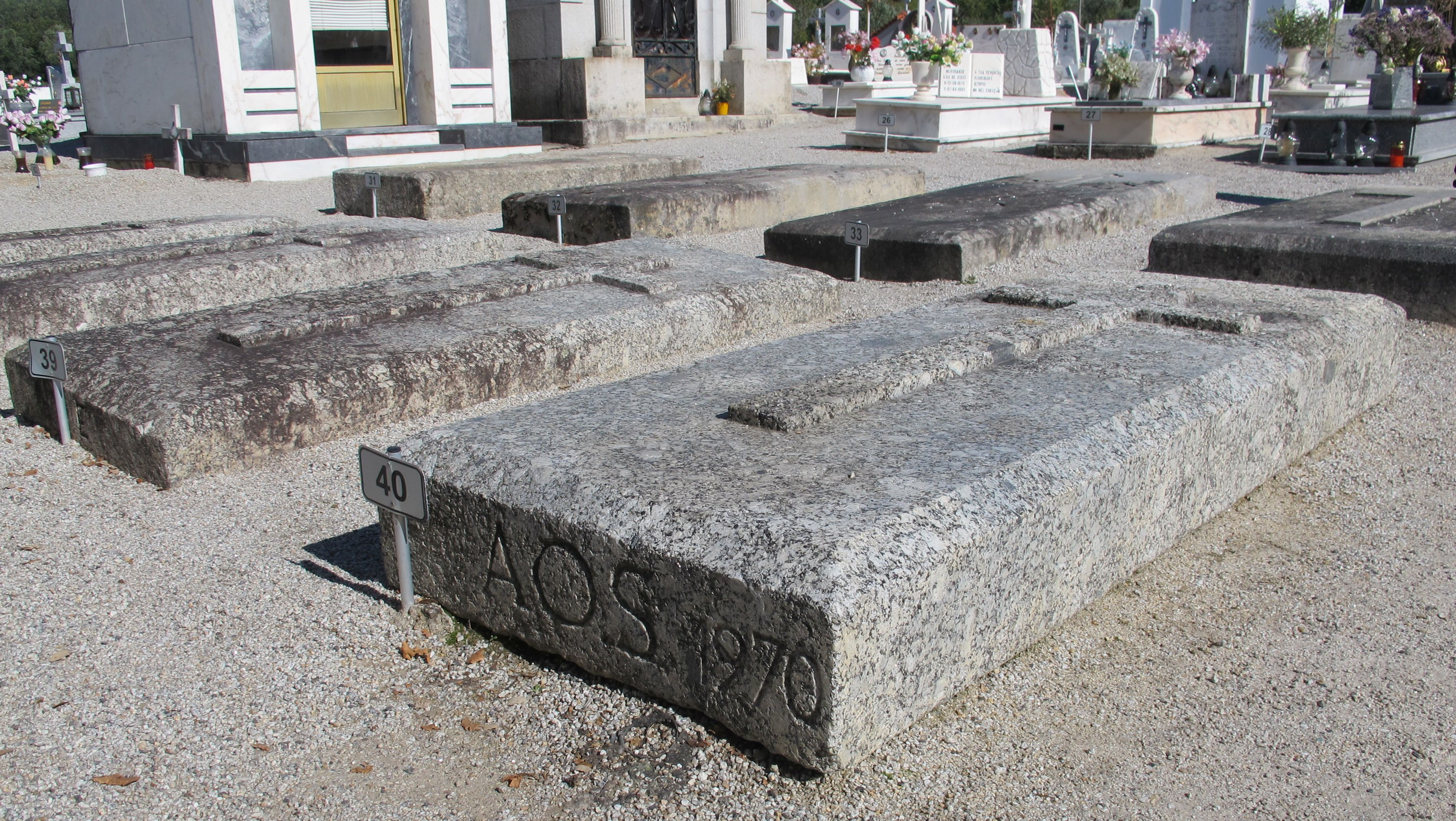
Oliveira Salazar's tomb in Vimieiro

Salazar lived for a further 23 months. After he emerged from over one month of coma and unexpectedly recovered lucidity, his intimates did not tell him he had been removed from power, instead allowing him to "rule" in privacy until his death on 27 July 1970.

Tens of thousands paid their last respects at the funeral, at the Requiem that took place at the Jerónimos Monastery, and at the passage of the special train that carried the coffin to his hometown of Vimieiro near Santa Comba Dão, where he was buried according to his wishes in his native soil, in a plain ordinary grave next to his parents. As a symbolic display of his views of Portugal and the colonial empire, there is footage of several members of the Mocidade Portuguesa, of both African and European ethnicity, paying homage at his funeral.

== Personal life ==
Salazar never married; he has no known descendants. Salazar's image in public opinion was of a man entirely dedicated to the nation, almost a monk, far removed from feminine temptations, and censorship maintained this image. However, this is not true. Salazar had several love affairs, although he was afraid of falling in love. One of his seminary colleagues commented: "He never says the words that people expect, he doesn't give in to impulses, as soon as he has given something from his heart, he hastens to take it back."

The first woman in his life was Felismina de Oliveira, a friend of his sister. She was a young woman from a modest background, who accompanied her on Saturday visits to Salazar at the seminary. Opposition from Felismina's family and Salazar's religious career put an end to the relationship. However, in 1910, Salazar left the seminary and entered the University of Coimbra; he never intended to be a priest.

In Coimbra he had an affair with the pianist Glória Castanheira, and then with her niece, Maria Laura Campos, married, whom he met several times in the Hotel Borges, in Lisbon, between 1931 and 1932, even after she had married for the second time. The affair ended when Laura moved to Seville with her husband. Also at the Hotel Borges, Salazar met Mercedes de Castro, a rich daughter of a diplomat. He also had a relationship with Maria Emilia Vieira, a young woman who, before meeting the dictator, had already enjoyed bohemian adventures in Paris as an astrologer and a dancer.

His last affair, the strongest and most lasting, seems to have been the one he had with Christine Garnier, a French journalist and writer, whom he called "the fragrant disorder". The latter, also married, had come to Portugal in 1961 with the idea of writing a book about Salazar. He invited her to come to Portugal on vacation, to Santa Comba Dão; she was amazed by the modesty of his house. Christine became his favorite, and from then on she made frequent trips between Portugal and France. Salazar abandoned his usual austerity for a while and bought her expensive gifts. The book was written: Férias com Salazar, a bestseller. In Paris, Christine's husband later found Salazar's letters to his wife, and eventually asked for a divorce.

Several historians and observers point to the probable platonic love of his virgin governess, Maria de Jesus Caetano Freire, for him. She had followed him from Coimbra, where she was already serving him, to Lisbon in 1928. She was a hard and strong woman, rigid, vengeful, with a "canine dedication" to the dictator – "an important character", he said. The governess was jealous of the attention he gave to the two girls whom he received at São Bento and who belonged to her family. Maria da Conceição Rita, one of the children, said that Salazar was incapable of going to bed without stopping by her room; he was also the one who played with them and told them stories. Salazar, seen by the world as a cold and distant man who rarely smiled, was nevertheless affectionate and concerned about those close to him.

== Writings ==
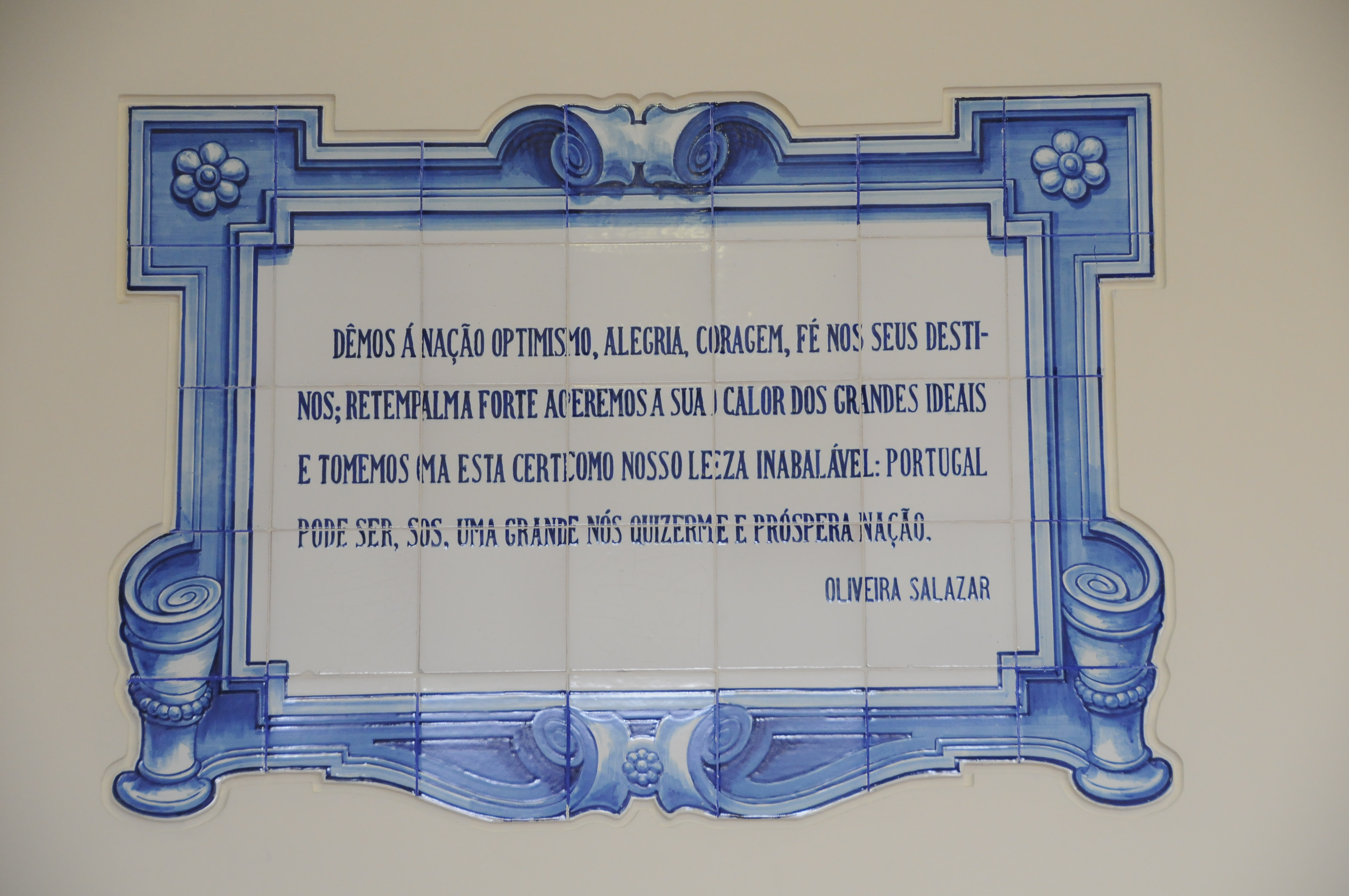
Azulejo with a quote from Salazar, in Esposende

The Portuguese literary historian António José Saraiva, a communist and a fierce lifelong political opponent of Salazar, claimed that one who reads Salazar's Speeches and Notes is overwhelmed by the clarity and conciseness of style, the most perfect and captivating doctrinal prose that exists in Portuguese, underscored by a powerful emotional rhythm. According to Saraiva, Salazar's prose deserves a prominent place in the history of Portuguese literature, and only political barriers have deprived it of its place. Saraiva says it is written with the clarity of the great prose of the 17th century, cleansed of all the distractions and sloppiness that often obscures the prose of the Portuguese scholars.

Salazar had books published, namely Como se Levanta um Estado ("How to Raise a State"), in which he criticised the philosophical ideals behind the Nuremberg laws, and Como se Reergue um Estado ("How to Re-erect a State").

== Legacy ==
=== Evaluation ===
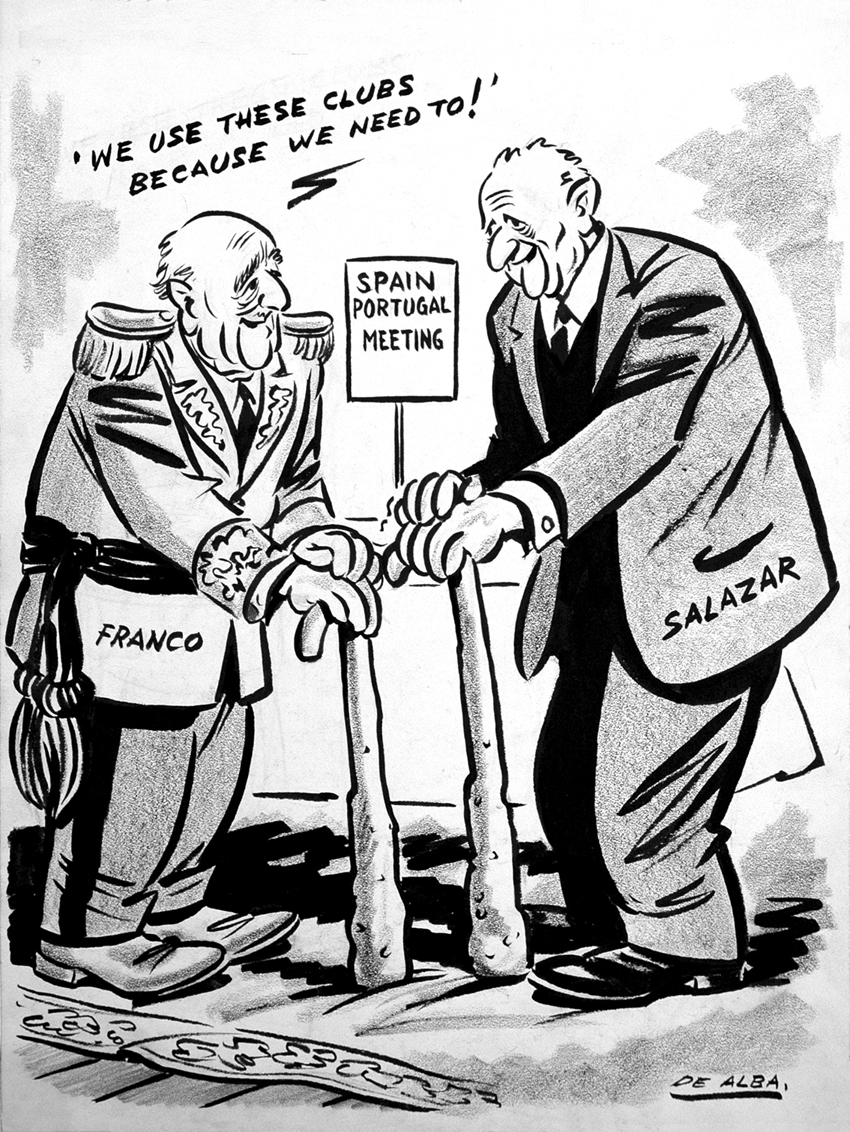
Caricature depicting Salazar and Franco as the "old men of Iberia", the last two dictators of Western Europe

Due to Salazar's long rule, a detached evaluation of him is difficult. While his rule saw more stability and prosperity than most living Portuguese had ever known, it came at the expense of democracy and civil liberties.

In 1983, historian Tom Gallagher criticised Salazar's excessive promises, writing that "Salazar was being deceitful when he told António Ferro in 1938, 'I estimate that within five years every child in this country will have the opportunity to read and write.' His true policy had been revealed six years earlier when he stated categorically, 'I consider more urgent the creation of elites than the necessity to teach people how to read.'" 50 years after Salazar's implementation literacy had jumped by 50% and the average number years of schooling had grown to seven.

Sir Samuel Hoare, the British Ambassador in Spain, recognised Salazar's crucial role in keeping the Iberian peninsula neutral during World War II, and lauded him. Hoare asserted that, in his 30 years of political life, he had met most of the leading statesmen of Europe, and regarded Salazar highly among those. Salazar was to him a learned and impressive thinker: part professor, part priest, part recluse of unshakable beliefs. He regarded him as ascetic, concentrated on serving his country, with an encyclopedic knowledge of Europe and indifferent to ostentation, luxury or personal gains. Hoare strongly believed in Salazar as "being a man of one idea – the good of his country", not wanting to endanger the work of national regeneration to which he had devoted the whole of his public life.

Historian Carlton Hayes, a pioneering specialist on the study of nationalism, was the American Ambassador in Spain during World War II. He met Salazar in person and agreed with Ambassador Hoare. Hayes wrote that Salazar "didn't look like a regular dictator. Rather, he appeared a modest, quiet, and highly intelligent gentleman and scholar ... literally dragged from a professorial chair of political economy in the venerable University of Coimbra a dozen years previously in order to straighten out Portugal's finances, and that his almost miraculous success in this respect had led to the thrusting upon him of other major functions, including those of Foreign Minister and constitution-maker." Hayes appreciated Portugal's endeavours to form a truly neutral peninsular bloc with Spain, an immeasurable contribution – at a time when the British and the United States had much less influence – towards counteracting the propaganda and appeals of the Axis.

Morito Morishima, the Japanese minister in Portugal during World War II, praised Salazar in his post-war memoirs: "It was the result of Salazar's intelligence and political ability that Japan–Portugal diplomatic relations were maintained until the war's end, and Salazar who was engaged in diplomacy with his calm attitude, firm theory and judgment, sophisticated expression was still vivid to my eyes. Every time I think about my stay in Portugal, I can't stop but thinking that if Japan had had one politician – just one – like Salazar, our country would have followed a different path and we would not be going through our current misfortune situation."

Belgian diplomat André de Staercke, dean of NATO's ambassadors, who served for almost 24 years on the alliance council, developed a close and long friendship with Salazar. In his memoirs, Staercke dedicates a full chapter to Salazar and ranks Salazar, together with Churchill and Paul-Henri Spaak as one of the three greatest political leaders he has met in his life.

The Portuguese literary historian, António José Saraiva, a communist and a fierce lifelong political opponent of Salazar, claimed that "Salazar was, undoubtedly, one of the most remarkable men in the history of Portugal and possessed a quality that remarkable men do not always have: the right intention."

The Portuguese historian, scholar, and editor, A. H. de Oliveira Marques, wrote of Salazar: "He considered himself the guide of the nation, believed that there were things which only he could do ('unfortunately there are a lot of things that seemingly only I can do' – official note published in September 1935) and convinced more and more of his countrymen of that too ... He became more and more of a dictator, more and more inclined to deify himself and to trust others less."

In November 1965, Time magazine said of Salazar: "Every four years, Premier António de Oliveira Salazar preserves Portugal's image as a democracy by blowing the dust off a few selected "opposition" leaders and relaxing police controls just enough for a few weeks to permit them to run for Portugal's 130-seat National Assembly. There are a few cracks in the facade. The assembly functions only as a rubber stamp. The opposition candidates are usually feeble old men left over from a regime that was discredited and overthrown four decades ago, and Salazar decides what they can and cannot talk about".

The Portuguese poet, writer, and literary critic Fernando Pessoa wrote that Salazar was "capable of governing within the limits of his area of expertise, which is financial science, but not (capable of governing) with the lack of limits of government in general", adding that "What is wrong, here, is not that Sr. Oliveira Salazar is Minister of Finance, which I accept is right, but that he is minister of everything, which is more questionable."

=== After Salazar ===
Salazar saw no prospects for his regime beyond his death. Nonetheless, the Estado Novo persisted under the direction of Caetano, Salazar's longtime aide as well as a well-reputed scholar of the University of Lisbon Law School, statesman and distinguished member of the regime who co-wrote the Constitution of 1933. Caetano tried to blunt the harsher edges of the regime he helped create, but the meager reforms he was able to wring out of the hardline elements of the government did not go nearly far enough for elements of the population who wanted more freedom. Unlike the gradual process of regime change in Spain, six years after Salazar's death, the Estado Novo fell suddenly to a military coup and was rapidly unwound, leading to the promulgation of a liberal-democratic constitution in 1976.

The 2020s Chega party's slogan, "God, country, family and work" is an appropriation and elaboration of the slogan "God, country, family" used by Salazar.

== Distinctions ==
=== Orders ===
Salazar was made member of the following Portuguese Orders.

- Grand Cross of the Order of Saint James of the Sword (15 April 1929)
- Grand Cross of the Order of the Colonial Empire (21 April 1932)
- Grand Cross of the Order of the Tower and Sword (28 May 1932, first civilian to receive such honor)
- Grand Collar of the Order of Prince Henry (4 October 1968)

He also received several other similar distinctions from countries including France, Germany, Belgium, Poland, Romania and Spain.

=== Academic distinctions ===
Salazar was conferred with the following academic distinctions.

- Oxford University, 1939, Honorary Degree of Doctor of Civil Law.
- Fordham University, 1938, Honorary Doctorate of Law.

== Sources ==
- Costa Pinto, António (2000). The Blue Shirts – Portuguese Fascists and the New State (PDF). Social Science Monographs, Boulder – Distributed by Columbia University Press, NY. ISBN 0-88033-982-9.
- Derrick, Michael (1938). The Portugal of Salazar. With introduction by R.J. Stove. New York: Campion Books, Ltd. online free
- Ducret, Diane (2012). Femmes de dictateur. Perrin.
- Egerton, F. Clement C. (1943). Salazar, Rebuilder of Portugal. London: Hodder & Stoughton.
- Gallagher, Tom (1983). Portugal: A Twentieth-century Interpretation. Manchester University Press. pp. 60, 99. ISBN 978-0-7190-0876-4.
- Gallagher, Tom (1990). "Chapter 9: Conservatism, dictatorship and fascism in Portugal, 1914–45". In Blinkhorn, Martin (ed.). Fascists and Conservatives. Routledge. pp. 157–173. ISBN 0-04-940086-X.
- Gallagher, Tom (2020). Salazar: The Dictator Who Refused To Die. C Hurst & Co Publishers Ltd. ISBN 978-1-78738-388-3.
- Hayes, Carlton J.H. (1945). Wartime Mission in Spain, 1942–1945 (1st ed.). Macmillan Company. ISBN 978-1-121-49724-5.
- Hoare, Samuel (1946). Ambassador on Special Mission. Collins; First Edition. pp. 124–25.
- Morishima, Morito (1950). Pearl Harbor, Lisboa, Tóquio – memórias de um diplomata. Iwanami Shoten. p. 108.
- Kay, Hugh (1970). Salazar and Modern Portugal. New York: Hawthorn Books.
- Leite, Joaquim da Costa (1998). "Neutrality by Agreement: Portugal and the British Alliance in World War II". American University International Law Review. 14 (1): 185–99.
- Lochery, Neill (2011). Lisbon: War in the Shadows of the City of Light, 1939–1945 (1st ed.). PublicAffairs. p. 345. ISBN 978-1-58648-879-6.
- Meneses, Filipe Ribeiro (2002). "Review: The Origins and Nature of Authoritarian Rule in Portugal, 1919–1945" (PDF). Contemporary European History. 11 (1): 153–163. doi:10.1017/S096077730200108X. JSTOR 20081821. S2CID 162411841.
- Meneses, Filipe Ribeiro (2009). Salazar: A Political Biography (1st ed.). Enigma Books. ISBN 978-1-929631-90-2.
- Milgram, Avraham (1999). "Portugal, the Consuls, and the Jewish Refugees,1938–1941" (PDF). Yad Vashem Studies. XXVII: 123–56.
- Milgram, Avraham (2011). Portugal, Salazar, and the Jews. Yad Vashem. p. 324. ISBN 978-9653083875.
- Nogueira, Franco (1977–1985), Salazar: estudo biográfico, 6 vol.

A mocidade e os princípios, 1889–1928 (3. ed. com estudo prévio pelo Joaquim Veríssimo Serrão). Vol. 1 (3a ed.). Porto [Portugal]: Civilização Editora. 2000 [1977]. ISBN 978-9722618397.
Os tempos áureos, 1928–1936 (2. ed.). Vol. 2. Porto: Livraria Civilização. 1977. ISBN 978-9722618403.
As grandes crises, 1936–1945. Vol. 3 (5a ed.). Porto: Livraria Civilização. 1978. ISBN 978-9722618434.
O ataque, 1945–1958. Vol. 4 (4a ed.). Porto: Livraria Civilização. 1980. ISBN 978-9722618441.
A resistência, 1958–1964. Vol. 5 (4th ed.). Porto: Livraria Civilização. 1984. ISBN 978-9722618410.
O último combate (1964–1970). Vol. 6. Porto [Portugal]: Civilização Editora. 1985.

- Pimentel, Irene; Ninhos, Claudia (2013). Salazar, Portugal e o Holocausto (in Portuguese). Lisbon: Temas e Debates. ISBN 978-9896442217.
- Pimentel, Irene Flunser (2006). Judeus em Portugal durante a II Guerra Mundial : em fuga de Hitler e do Holocausto (in Portuguese). Lisboa: Esfera dos Livros. ISBN 9789896261054.
- Pimentel, Irene Flunser (2007). A história da PIDE (in Portuguese). Círculo de Leitores. ISBN 9789727599561.
- Ramos, Rui (2010). História de Portugal (4th ed.). A Esfera dos Livros.
- Rendel, Sir George (1957). The Sword and the Olive – Recollections of Diplomacy and Foreign Service 1913–1954 (First ed.). John Murray. ASIN B000UVRG60.
- Wheeler, Douglas L. (1983). "In the Service of Order: The Portuguese Political Police and the British, German and Spanish Intelligence, 1932–1945". Journal of Contemporary History. 18 (1): 1–25. doi:10.1177/002200948301800101. JSTOR 260478. S2CID 153719176.
- Wheeler, Douglas L.; Walter C. Opello (2010). Historical Dictionary of Portugal. Scarecrow Press. pp. 238–41. ISBN 978-0-8108-7075-8.
- Wiarda, Howard J. (1977). Corporatism and Development: The Portuguese Experience (First ed.). Univ of Massachusetts Press. ISBN 978-0-87023-221-3.
- Projecção de Salazar no Estrangeiro, 1928–1948 (in Portuguese). Porto: União Nacional. 1949.

Political offices
Preceded by Domingos Oliveira	Prime Minister of Portugal; 1932–1968	Succeeded by Marcelo Caetano
Preceded by Óscar Carmona	Interim President of Portugal; 1951	Succeeded by Francisco Craveiro Lopes
Preceded by Óscar Carmona	Interim President of Portugal; 1935	Succeeded by Óscar Carmona
