= José Alberto dos Reis =

Portuguese jurist

- Born: 1 November 1875; Vale de Azares, Portugal
- Died: 2 September 1955; Portugal
- Occupation(s): Jurist, professor and politician

José Alberto dos Reis (November 1, 1875 – September 2, 1955) was a Portuguese jurist and the leading Portuguese authority on legal procedure in the 20th century.

A law professor in Coimbra, Reis held several academic and public offices, including that of member of the Assembleia Nacional in 1934–45. He was the leading redactor and commentator of the 1939 code of civil procedure. Reis's academic writings show an inclination to prefer practical solutions over dated formalisms in issues of legal procedure.

== Bibliography ==
- Scholz, Johannes-Michael (2001). "José Alberto dos Reis". In Michael Stolleis (ed.). Juristen: ein biographisches Lexikon; von der Antike bis zum 20. Jahrhundert (in German) (2nd ed.). München: Beck. p. 26. ISBN 3-406-45957-9.
