= Thomas Gerard Gallagher =

British academic (born 1954)

Thomas Gerard Philip Gallagher
- Born: 1954 (age 71–72); Glasgow, Scotland
- Education: University of Manchester
- Scientific career
- Fields: Politics, History, Pedagogy
- Workplaces: University of Bradford
- Doctoral students: Sadegh Zibakalam

Thomas Gerard Philip Gallagher (born 1954) is a Scottish political scientist. He taught politics at the University of Bradford until 2011 and is now Emeritus Professor of Politics at the university.

== Career ==
Gallagher obtained a BA hons degree in politics and modern history from the University of Manchester in 1975 and a Ph.D. from government from the same institution in 1978. He taught history at Edge Hill College, Lancashire until 1980, before joining the staff at the University of Bradford where he obtained a personal chair in 1996.

== Bibliography ==
=== Single-authored books on politics and contemporary history ===
- Gallagher, Tom (1979). Dictatorial Portugal, 1926-1974: a bibliography. Published under the auspices of the International Conference Grp. on Modern Portugal c/o Dept. of History, University of New Hampshire. OCLC 12285411.
- Gallagher, Tom (1983). Portugal : a twentieth-century interpretation. Manchester University Press. ISBN 9780719008764.
- Gallagher, Tom (1987). Glasgow, the uneasy peace : religious tension in modern Scotland, 1819-1914. Manchester University Press. ISBN 9780719023965.
- Gallagher, Tom (1987). Edinburgh divided : John Cormack and no popery in the 1930s. Polygon. ISBN 978-0948275401.
- Gallagher, Tom (1995). Romania after Ceaușescu: the politics of intolerance. Edinburgh University Press. ISBN 9780748606139.
- Gallagher, Tom (2001). Outcast Europe: the Balkans, 1789-1989, from the Ottomans to Milošević. Routledge. ISBN 0415270898.
- Gallagher, Tom (2003). The Balkans after the Cold War: from tyranny to tragedy. Routledge. ISBN 0415277639.
- Gallagher, Tom (2005). The Balkans in the new millennium: in the shadow of war and peace. Routledge. ISBN 9780415349406.
- Gallagher, Tom (2005). Theft of a nation: Romania since communism. Hurst & Co. ISBN 9781850657163.
- Gallagher, Tom (2009). The illusion of freedom: Scotland under nationalism. Hurst. ISBN 9781850659952.
- Gallagher, Tom (2009). Romania and the European Union: how the weak vanquished the strong. Manchester University Press. ISBN 978-0-7190-7743-2.
- Gallagher, Tom (2013). Divided Scotland: Ethnic Friction and Christian Crisis. Argyll. ISBN 978-1-908931-28-3.
- Gallagher, Tom (2014). Europe's Path to Crisis: Disintegration via Monetary Union. Manchester University Press. ISBN 978-0-7190-9604-4.
- Gallagher, Tom (2015). Scotland now: a warning to the world. Scotview Publications. ISBN 978-0993465406.
- Gallagher, Tom (2020). Salazar: the dictator who refused to die. C HURST & CO PUB LTD. ISBN 978-1787383883.

=== Novels ===
- Gallagher, Tom (2018). Flight of Evil: A North British Intrigue. Scotview Publications.
- Gallagher, Tom (2018). England Possessed. Scotview Publications.

=== Selected edited volumes ===
- Pridham, Geoffrey; Gallagher, Tom; Pridham, Professor of European Politics and Director Centre for Mediterranean Studies Geoffrey (2000). Experimenting with Democracy: Regime Change in the Balkans. Routledge. ISBN 978-0-415-18726-8.
- Gallagher, Tom; Williams, Allan M. (1989). Southern European Socialism: Parties, Elections, and the Challenge of Government. Manchester University Press. ISBN 978-0-7190-2500-6.
- Walker, Graham (1990). Gallagher, Tom (ed.). Sermons and battle hymns: Protestant popular culture in modern Scotland. Edinburgh University Press. ISBN 978-0-7486-0217-9.

=== Other ===
- Gallagher, Tom (1990). Blinkhorn, Martin (ed.). Fascists and conservatives : the radical right and the establishment in twentieth-century Europe. Unwin Hyman. pp. 157–176. ISBN 004940086X.
- Gallagher, Tom (1996). "Chapter 4 - Portugal". In Buchanan, Tom; Conway, Martin (eds.). Political Catholicism in Europe, 1918-1965. Clarendon Press; Oxford University Press. ISBN 978-0-19-820319-3. OCLC 807023238.

=== Selected articles ===
- Gallagher, Tom (1979). "The Portuguese Communist Party and Eurocommunism". The Political Quarterly. 50 (2): 205–218. doi:10.1111/j.1467-923X.1979.tb02452.x. ISSN 1467-923X.
- Gallagher, Tom (1979). "Controlled Repression in Salazar's Portugal". Journal of Contemporary History. 14 (3): 385–402. doi:10.1177/002200947901400302. S2CID 153579115.
- Gallagher, Tom (September 2018). "Salazar: Portugal's Great Dictator". History Today. 68 (9).
