= 2022 in Portugal =

- Decades: 2000s; 2010s; 2020s; 2030s
- See also: History of Portugal; Timeline of Portuguese history; List of years in Portugal

Events in the year 2022 in Portugal.

== Incumbents ==
- President: Marcelo Rebelo de Sousa
- Prime Minister: António Costa (Socialist)

== Events ==
Ongoing — COVID-19 pandemic in Portugal

- 2 January – AIDAnova, a cruise ship operated by German cruise line AIDA Cruises and carrying 4,197 people, docked in Lisbon, Portugal, after 52 crew members tested positive for COVID-19 and isolated at various hotels.
- 30 January - Portuguese people vote in a snap parliamentary election.
- 1 February - Portuguese Prime Minister António Costa announces that he has tested positive for COVID-19.
- 11 February - Portuguese police, with help from the FBI, arrest an 18-year-old boy for planning an armed attack on a university in Lisbon.
- 12 March - Portuguese footballer Cristiano Ronaldo surpasses Josef Bican as the sport's official top goalscorer of all time as recorded by FIFA, after scoring his 806th and 807th goals during a Premier League match with Manchester United against Tottenham Hotspur.
- 5 April - Portugal expels Russian diplomats due to the Russian invasion of Ukraine.
- 18 May - Portugal confirms its first five cases of monkeypox.
- 21 May - Three people are killed and more than 30 are injured in a bus crash on the motorway near Mealhada.
- 28 June - Portugal reports more than ten new cases of monkeypox.
- 8 July - Portugal issues warnings of temperatures as high as 43 °C (109 °F) amid a drought and wildfires in parts of the country.
- 14 July - Pinhão, district of Vila Real, sets the highest July temperature ever in Portugal, reaching 47.0 °C (116.6 °F).
- 15 July - Portugal reports 238 deaths related to the ongoing heat wave as it battles more than 30 active wildfires. In France, more than 10,000 people have fled wildfires in Gironde and in Spain, firefighters continue to battle forest fires near the town of Monsagro.
- 16 July - In Vila Nova de Foz Côa a waterbombing plane crashes while fighting wildfires in the region, killing the pilot, and in Spain, around 2,300 people are evacuated from the Costa del Sol due to wildfires in the Mijas hills.
- 19 July - The death toll from the wildfires and heat wave in Spain and Portugal increases to more than 1,700 people, with more than 1,063 deaths in Portugal.

== Deaths ==
- 8 January – Lourdes Castro, abstract artist (b. 1930)
- 17 January - Armando Gama, singer-songwriter (b. 1954)
- 22 January - António Lima Pereira, footballer (b. 1952)
- 3 February - Lauro António, film director (b. 1942)
- 4 February - Rolando Gonçalves, footballer (b.1944)
- 6 February - Maria Carrilho, politician (b. 1943)
- 9 February - Jaime Serra, politician (b. 1921)
- 15 February - Artur Albarran, journalist (b. 1953)
- 14 March - Jorge Silva Melo, theatre director (b. 1948)
- 19 March - Joel Hasse Ferreira, politician (b. 1944)
- 5 April - Joaquim Carvalho, footballer (b. 1937)
- 15 April - Eunice Muñoz, actress (b. 1928)
- 17 April - Eduardo Barbeiro, Olympic swimmer (b. 1932)
- 2 May - João Gago Horta, politician (b. 1943)
- 7 May - Elisa Maria Damião, politician (b. 1946)
- 10 May - Manuel Abreu, footballer (b. 1959)
- 13 May - João Rendeiro, banker (b. 1952)
- 29 May - Raquel Seruca, oncobiologist (b. 1962)
- 8 June - Fernando Pinto Monteiro, jurist (b. 1942)
- 8 June - Dame Paula Rego, visual-artist (b. 1935)
- 5 August - Ana Luísa Amaral, poet, (b. 1956)
- 10 August - João de Almeida Bruno, judge (b. 1935)
- 10 August - Fernando Chalana, footballer (b. 1959)
- 22 August - António de Sousa Braga, Roman Catholic prelate (b. 1941)
- 23 August - Carlos Duarte, footballer (b. 1933)
- 28 October - José Da Silva Costa, Economist, professor, researcher, and consultant
