= 2026 in Portugal =

- Decades: 2000s; 2010s; 2020s; 2030s
- See also: History of Portugal; Timeline of Portuguese history; List of years in Portugal

Events in the year 2026 in Portugal.

== Incumbents ==
- President – Marcelo Rebelo de Sousa (until 9 March); António José Seguro (since 9 March)
- Prime Minister – Luís Montenegro (Social Democratic)

== Events ==
=== January ===
- 7–8 January – Three people die due to delays, and problems, in emergency medical services from the National Institute of Medical Emergencies (INEM).
- 9 January – Guimarães begins its programming as the 2026 European Green Capital city.
- 18 January – 2026 Portuguese presidential election (first round): No candidate wins an overall majority, with António José Seguro and André Ventura heading to a runoff with 31.1% and 23.5% of respective votes. This will be the second time that a direct Portuguese presidential election required a runoff, the first one being in 1986.
- 20 January – Police arrest 37 suspects linked to an ultra far-right network accused of racially-motivated hate crimes, seizing weapons and neo-Nazi materials during a nationwide operation targeting Grupo 1143.
- 26 January – Authorities announce the seizure of nine tonnes of cocaine and the arrest of four foreign nationals from Latin America aboard a narcosubmarine off the Azores.
- 28 January – Storm Kristin causes a catastrophic impact with gusts of 208.8 km/h (129.7 mph) in Soure and unofficially 238 km/h (148 mph) in Lavos, which resulted in €6 billion in damage in the central region of Portugal, 14 deaths and 2,000 injuries.
- 29 January – A state of calamity is decreed by the government for the areas affected by Storm Kristin.

=== February ===
- 5 February – Storm Leonardo hits Portugal, raising red alerts for river flooding, flash floods, and heavy rain.
- 8 February – 2026 Portuguese presidential election (second round): António José Seguro is elected President of the Republic with 67% of the votes, against André Ventura's 33%.
- 10 February – Maria Lúcia Amaral resigns as home affairs minister, following criticism over the response to the 2026 European storm training. It is the first resignation of Montenegro's second government, eight months after taking office.
- 11 February – Part of the A1 motorway, the most important highway in the country, collapses near Coimbra following a flood caused by a collapsed levee of the Mondego River.
- 19 February –
  - Two 4.1 magnitude earthquakes are felt in Lisbon district and its surroundings. No damage or victims were reported.
  - 124 people are arrested by the Public Security Police following clashes between S.L. Benfica and Sporting CP fans before a futsal match.
- 23 February – Luís Neves, until then Director of Judiciary Police, takes office as Minister of Home Affairs.
- 27 February – Full reopening of the A1 motorway in Coimbra following repair works due to floods.

=== March ===
- 9 March – António José Seguro is sworn in as President of Portugal, succeeding Marcelo Rebelo de Sousa.
- 20 March – The Assembly of the Republic repeals the 2018 law on the right to self-determination of gender identity, by reintroducing the requirement for medical validation for gender reassignment and banning puberty blockers.
- 21 March – An anarchist is arrested for throwing a Molotov cocktail against participants in the "March for Life", in Lisbon.
- 26 March – The Portuguese Catholic Church announces it will pay €1,6 million ($1,85 million) in financial compensations to 57 victims of sexual abuse by Catholic clergy.

=== April ===
- 1 April – A new nationality law is approved by the Assembly of the Republic, in response to several parts of the previous proposal that were rejected by the Constitutional Court in November 2025.
- 2 April – The 1976 Constitution marks 50 years since its approval.
- 13 April – The Portuguese government requests support from the European Union Solidarity Fund due to the winter storms.
- 21 April – The Socialist Party (PS) asks the Constitutional Court to rule on a decree of the new nationality law regarding the penalty of loss of nationality for immigrants who have acquired citizenship and then commit serious crimes.
- 24 April – The Judiciary Police arrest a man who tried to sell 278 paintings, some possibly by Pablo Picasso and Joan Miró, illegally in the black market.

=== May ===
- 3 May – President António José Seguro promulgates the recent changes to the nationality law.
- 5 May – Fifteen police officers are detained following an investigation on cases of alleged torture of migrants and homeless at two central Lisbon precincts.
- 7 May –
  - A soldier undertaking a parachuting course dies after an accident at Tancos air base.
  - Negotiations between employers' associations, unions, and the government regarding the new labour legislation end without an agreement.
- 8 May – The Constitutional Court strikes down the nationality law decree that would allow the criminal penalty of loss of citizenship for immigrants who commit serious crimes.
- 21 May – A French couple, mother and stepfather, are arrested by Portuguese police after abandoning their children, two boys both under the age of 5, on a road near Alcácer do Sal, in Setúbal district.

=== June ===
- 3 June –
  - A general strike, the second in six months, is called by the General Confederation of the Portuguese Workers (CGTP) against the government's labour reforms.
  - Portugal is elected to a rotating seat at the United Nations Security Council.
- 10 June – President António José Seguro vetoes a parliamentary bill that would ban "ideological flags" from being displayed on public buildings.
- 11 June–19 July – Portugal participates at the 2026 FIFA World Cup.
- 15 June – Killing of Odair Moniz: A Sintra court judge sentences the police officer who shot Odair Moniz in October 2024 to three and a half years of suspended imprisonment.
- 19 June –
  - The Assembly of the Republic rejects the government's labour reform, with far-right Chega and center-left to left-wing parties blocking the proposed legislation.
  - Public Prosecution charges members of the neo-Nazi Movimento Armilar Lusitano of planning attacks against Luís Montenegro, António Costa, former living Presidents, and other well-known personalities.
- 28 June – A 4.1 magnitude earthquake is felt in the Algarve. No damage or victims are reported.

=== July ===
- 2 July – 2026 Portugal wildfires: Several wildfires spread across the country.
- 3 July – The government activates the European Union Civil Protection Mechanism (UCPM) because of wildfires and a heat wave which dangerously increases the risk of further wildfires.
- 7 July – A bus accident at Agualva-Cacém railway station leaves two dead and 20 injured.
- 9 July – Almada declares a state of alert because of a water supply crisis, due to low reservoirs, leading to cuts and rationing for the population.
- 17 July – Grades for the Secondary Education National Exams begin to be published following several problems with the new digital classification process, which created delays and errors.
- 21 July – Public Prosecution opens an inquiry into the management of Luís Neves, current minister of home affairs, in his former role as director of the Judiciary Police, in relation to alleged crimes of smuggling and abuse of power in a case concerning the loan of a seized drug trailer to a contractor friend of his.

=== August ===
- 4 August – A bus crashes into the façade of Tomar's hospital, killing one person and seriously injuring three others.
- 7 August – President António José Seguro sends the proposed changes to the "Law of Return" to the Constitutional Court, raising concerns about the possibility of separating parents from children or expelling minor Portuguese naturalized children.
- 10 August –
  - A Swedish tourist is hit by a stray bullet during a fight related to drug dealing in Lisbon Baixa.
  - Two earthquakes, with magnitude of 3.3, are felt in Lisbon district and the Alentejo region. No damage or victims are reported.
- 12 August – A total solar eclipse occurs at the Moon's descending node of the orbit in North America and Europe. The total eclipse passes over the Arctic, Greenland, Iceland, the Atlantic Ocean, northeastern Portugal and northern Spain.
- 14 August – British cyclist Finlay Tarling is killed in a collision with a light goods vehicle with during the eighth stage of the 2026 Volta a Portugal.
- 18 August – President Seguro promulgates the so-called "burqa law", which outlaws face concealment in public spaces.
- 17–20 August – Several wildfires break out, causing injuries, some critical, to firefighters.
- 21 August – Two soldiers are killed after being hit by a car on the A1 motorway in Mealhada, while assisting a stopped truck driver.
- 25 August – Twelve people are injured, some seriously, after a drunken hit-and-run in Albufeira.
- 31 August – President António José Seguro approves the new "Law of Return," following an unanimous vote by the Constitutional Court in favor of the changes.

=== September ===
- 2 September – Opposition leader André Ventura submits a motion of no confidence against the government in light of the controversies surrounding minister of home affairs Luís Neves.
- 8 September –
  - Portugal sanctions products from Israeli settlements in the West Bank. (Note: However, Portugal clarified that settlement trade restrictions are contingent on EU action.)
  - The Assembly of the Republic rejects the motion of no confidence against the government.
- 23 September – Public Prosecution conducts searches at the facilities of the Judiciary Police due to suspicions of the use of illegal wiretaps in the Football Leaks case.
- 25 September – Protests against rising fuel prices lead hundreds of truck drivers to hold a slow march along several roads nationwide.

=== October ===
- 10 October – Protests held in several cities across the country against the rising cost of living and housing.
- 12 October – Construction begins on the high-speed rail line between Porto and Lisbon.
- 14 October – The government announces the sale of almost half of TAP Air Portugal's shares to Lufthansa for €1,2 billion.
- 15 October – Clashes between police and protesters in Porto, related to the lack and cost of housing, leave several injured.
- 25 October – Clashes between police and protesters in Lisbon, again related to the issue of housing, results in arrests and injuries to some people, and also raises criticism regarding the police's use of force.
- 26 October – A proposed merger between Galp Energia and Spanish energy company Moeve is called off after months of negotiations.

=== November ===
- 6 November – A bomb threat is made on a Ryanair flight traveling from Rome to Lisbon, triggering an emergency deployment by the Public Security Police upon landing at Humberto Delgado Airport.
- 10 November – Government declared a state of alert and decided do close schools and non-essential services after weather forecasts predicted strong winds and rain due to Storm Charles.
- 11 November – At least four patients allegedly died following lack of adequate care in Portimão hospital, Algarve, with inquiries being opened.

== Art and entertainment ==
- List of Portuguese submissions for the Academy Award for Best International Feature Film

== Holidays ==
- 1 January – New Year's Day
- 3 April – Good Friday
- 5 April – Easter Sunday
- 25 April – Freedom Day
- 1 May – Labour Day
- 4 June – Feast of Corpus Christi
- 10 June – Portugal Day
- 15 August – Assumption Day
- 5 October – Republic Day
- 1 November – All Saints' Day
- 1 December – Independence Restoration Day
- 8 December – Immaculate Conception
- 25 December – Christmas Day

== Deaths ==
- 13 January – José Rodrigo, 91, MP (1985–1987).
- 27 January –
  - António Chainho, 88, fado guitarist.
  - Fernando Mamede, 74, athlete and long distance running specialist.
- 29 January – João Canijo, 68, film director.
- 5 February – Joana Lopes, 87, systems engineer and anti-fascist.
- 5 March – António Lobo Antunes, 83, novelist and retired medical doctor.
- 7 March – Nuno Morais Sarmento, 65, politician and former minister (2002–2005).
- 25 March – José Maria Ricciardi, 71, economist and banker.
- 31 March – Armando Alves, 90, painter.
- 6 April – Álvaro Cassuto, 87, composer and conductor.
- 7 May – Carlos Brito, 93, politician, 1980 presidential candidate, MP (1975–1991).
- 11 July – Manú, 43, footballer, (Marítimo, Legia Warsaw, Alverca).
- 18 July – Zdeněk Chovanec, 21, racing driver (FIA Formula 3).
- 21 July – Fernando Menezes, 74, lawyer, president (2000–2008) and member of the Legislative Assembly of the Azores (1992–2008).
- 22 July – Luís Represas, 69, singer and composer.
- 22 August – Quévin Castro, 25, footballer (West Bromwich Albion, York City).
- 29 August – Narana Coissoró, 94, politician and MP (1976–1995; 1999–2005).
- 21 September – Jorge Palma, 76, singer and songwriter.
- 9 October – António Vitalino Dantas, 84, Roman Catholic prelate, auxiliary bishop of Lisbon (1996–1999) and bishop of Beja (1999–2016).

== See also ==
- 2026 in the European Union
- 2026 in Europe
