= 2025 in Portugal =

- Decades: 2000s; 2010s; 2020s; 2030s
- See also: History of Portugal; Timeline of Portuguese history; List of years in Portugal

Events in the year 2025 in Portugal.

== Incumbents ==
- President – Marcelo Rebelo de Sousa
- Prime Minister – Luís Montenegro (Social Democratic)

== Events ==
=== January ===
- 12 January – An incendiary device is thrown at the Venezuelan consulate in Lisbon, causing minor damage.
- 17 January – Madeira's Legislative Assembly is dissolved and an election is called for 23 March, the third in just over one year.

=== February ===
- 15 February – Correio da Manhã publishes the first reports that would lead to the Spinumviva case, regarding Prime Minister Montenegro's family business.
- 17 February – A 4.7 magnitude earthquake hits the Lisbon metropolitan area. No damage or victims are reported.

=== March ===
- 11 March – The government of Prime Minister Luís Montenegro loses a no-confidence vote in the Assembly of the Republic, following new developments on the Spinumviva case.
- 13 March – President Marcelo Rebelo de Sousa calls an early legislative election for 18 May 2025.
- 23 March – 2025 Madeiran regional election: The Social Democratic Party wins, again, the most seats and falls short of a majority by just one seat.
- 25 March – Authorities announce the arrest of five people and the seizure of 6.5 tons of cocaine from a semi-submersible vessel that was intercepted off the Azores.

=== April ===
- 25 April – A far-right demonstration in celebration of the Carnation Revolution ends in clashes with police in central Lisbon.
- 28 April – A massive blackout hits the Iberian Peninsula, causing extensive power outages across mainland Portugal.

=== May ===
- 17 May – Sporting CP win the 2024–25 Primeira Liga after defeating Vitória de Guimarães 2–0 in the final, the club's first Bi-championship in 73 years.
- 18 May – 2025 Portuguese legislative election: The Democratic Alliance of Prime Minister Luis Montenegro retains its plurality in the Assembly of the Republic, followed by Chega and the Socialist Party.
- 24 May – 2025 UEFA Women's Champions League final, held at José Alvalade Stadium in Lisbon.

=== June ===
- 5 June – The XXV Constitutional Government of Portugal, led by Prime Minister Luis Montenegro, is inaugurated.
- 8 June – Portugal wins the 2025 UEFA Nations League Finals after defeating Spain 5–3 in penalties.
- 11 June – The Ministry of the Environment announces the creation of a marine protected marine area around the Gorringe Ridge in the Atlantic Ocean.
- 16 June – Six suspected members of the far-right Movimento Armilar Lusitano are arrested on suspicion of involvement in terrorist activity and possession of weapons and explosives.
- 28 June – José Luís Carneiro is elected as the new leader of the Socialist Party (PS).

=== July ===
- 19 July – Mariana Leitão is elected as new leader of the Liberal Initiative (IL).
- 24 July – Álvaro Santos Pereira, former economy minister under the XIX Constitutional Government of Portugal, is nominated as the new Governor of the Bank of Portugal. The outgoing governor Mário Centeno, becomes the first governor to not be reappointed in 25 years.
- 25 July – President Marcelo Rebelo de Sousa sends to the Constitutional Court the new immigration law approved by the government, citing several legal doubts about the restrictions proposed in the new law.
- 31 July – The government announces that it is preparing to recognize the State of Palestine by September.

=== August ===
- 8 August –
  - The Constitutional Court blocks the government's new immigration law.
  - A total of 38 Moroccan migrants, including seven children, arrive by boat at a beach in Vila do Bispo, Algarve. The migrants are ordered by a court to leave Portugal.
- 10 August – A Brazilian man is summarily executed on a street in Póvoa de Varzim, in an incident related to gang violence.
- 14 August – 2025 European heatwaves: Portugal registers more than 950 deaths in excess, since 26 July, because of extreme temperatures.
- 15 August – 2025 wildfire season: Portugal activates the European Union Civil Protection Mechanism (UCPM). By 25 August, four people have died as a result of the wildfires, with over 278,000 hectares of land reported to have burned.
- 16 August – A fire at a nursing home in Mirandela kills six patients and injures 25 others.
- 22 August – A forcado and a spectator die during a bullfight at the Campo Pequeno Bullring in Lisbon.
- 27 August – President Marcelo Rebelo de Sousa calls US President Donald Trump a "Russian asset" against Ukraine.

=== September ===
- 3 September –
  - Sixteen people are displaced in a building collapse in Graça, Lisbon.
  - Ascensor da Glória derailment: A tram car of the Ascensor da Glória derails due to a loose cable and crashes into a building near Avenida da Liberdade in Lisbon, killing 16 people and injuring 21 others.
- 20 September – Portugal announces that it would recognize the State of Palestine effective the next day.
- 21 September – Portugal formally recognizes the State of Palestine.
- 24 September – A hurricane warning is issued for the Azores due to the approach of Hurricane Gabrielle.
- 27 September – The Arrábida Natural Park is designated as a biosphere reserve by UNESCO.

=== October ===
- 12 October – 2025 Portuguese local elections: The Social Democratic Party wins the most councils across the country.
- 17 October – The Assembly of the Republic approves a ban on face veils for "gender or religious" reasons and making it punishable by up to 2,000 euros.
- 28 October – The Assembly of the Republic approves the new Portuguese nationality law, which restricts the path and expands the time needed to gain Portuguese citizenship.
- 30 October – Presidential elections are called for 18 January 2026, with a possible second round on 8 February 2026.

=== November ===
- 8 November – Large protests are held in Lisbon against proposed labor reforms.
- 12–15 November – Heavy rain fall, floods and extreme wind phenomena by Storm Claudia kill at least three people and injures several, with reports of damage to numerous homes, roads, and vehicles nationwide.
- 16 November – Portugal qualifies for the 2026 FIFA World Cup after defeating Armenia 9–1 at the 2026 FIFA World Cup qualification.
- 25 November – Seventeen people, including ten National Republican Guard (GNR) agents and one Public Security Police (PSP) agent, are arrested following an investigation into exploitation of illegal immigrants.
- 27 November – Portugal wins the FIFA U-17 World Cup for the first time.
- 30 November – José Manuel Pureza is elected as the new leader of the Left Bloc (BE).

=== December ===
- 1 December – President Marcelo Rebelo de Sousa is admitted to the University Hospital of São João in Porto for urgent surgery due to an incarcerated hernia.
- 7 December – Portugal finishes in second place at the inaugural edition of the FIFA Futsal Women's World Cup held in the Philippines after losing to Brazil 1–0 in the final.
- 11 December – A general strike is called by the General Confederation of the Portuguese Workers (CGTP) and the General Union of Workers (UGT) unions against the government's labour reforms.
- 13 December – A 4.1 magnitude earthquake hits the Central region. No damage or victims are reported.
- 15 December – The Constitutional Court blocks several rules of the government's new nationality law.
- 17 December – The Public Prosecution Office closes the Spinumviva case, regarding Prime Minister Montenegro's family business negotiations, with no accusation being made.
- 22 December – A court in Lisbon, Portugal, orders Chega presidential candidate André Ventura to remove campaign posters targeting the Romani people within 24 hours, ruling that the materials are discriminatory and may incite hatred, or face daily fines of €2,500 (US$2,940) per poster.
- 23 December – A British national is killed in a stabbing in Tomar that leaves another British national and a GNR officer injured. The attacker dies in a suspected gas explosion.

== Art and entertainment ==
- List of Portuguese submissions for the Academy Award for Best International Feature Film
- List of Portuguese films of 2025

== Holidays ==
- 1 January – New Year's Day
- 18 April – Good Friday
- 20 April – Easter Sunday
- 25 April – Freedom Day
- 1 May – Labour Day
- 10 June – Portugal Day
- 19 June – Feast of Corpus Christi
- 15 August – Assumption Day
- 5 October – Republic Day
- 1 November – All Saints' Day
- 1 December – Independence Restoration Day
- 8 December – Immaculate Conception
- 25 December – Christmas Day

== Deaths ==
=== January ===
- 22 January – Vasco Joaquim Rocha Vieira, 85, chief of staff (1976–1978) and governor of Macau (1992–1999).

=== February ===
- 2 February – Abílio Rodas de Sousa Ribas, 94, Roman Catholic prelate, bishop of São Tomé and Príncipe (1984–2006).
- 4 February – Aga Khan IV, 88, British-Portuguese religious leader, imam of Nizari Ismaili (since 1957) and Olympic skier (1964).
- 15 February – Jorge Nuno Pinto da Costa, 87, President of FC Porto (1982–2024).

=== July ===
- 3 July –
  - Diogo Jota, 28, footballer (Wolverhampton Wanderers, Liverpool, national team).
  - André Silva, 25, footballer (Penafiel).
- 27 July – Nuno Portas, 90, architect.

=== August ===
- 5 August – Jorge Costa, 53, footballer (Porto, national team), manager (AVS) and executive.
- 15 August – João Barreiras Duarte, 60, politician.

=== September ===
- 1 September – Pedro Massano, 77, journalist and illustrator.

=== October ===
- 7 October – Catarina de Albuquerque, 55, lawyer and human rights activist, CEO of Sanitation and Water for All (since 2018).
- 21 October – Francisco Pinto Balsemão, 88, former Prime Minister (1981–1983); founder of the Social Democratic Party (PSD); owner and founder of Impresa media group, that holds Expresso newspaper, SIC television network and several other publications.
- 23 October – Álvaro Laborinho Lúcio, 83, Jurist, former justice minister (1990–1995) in the 11th and 12th Constitutional governments.

=== December ===
- 2 December – Constança Cunha e Sá, 67, journalist and a political commentator.
- 3 December – Olga Cardoso, 91, radio announcer, television presenter, and singer, best known for her talk show Amiga Olga (My friend Olga) on TVI.
- 7 December – Anita Guerreiro, 89, actress and fado singer.
- 9 December – Clara Pinto-Correia, 65, novelist, journalist and educator.
- 11 December – Glória de Matos, 89, actress.
- 16 December – Nuno Loureiro, 48, plasma physicist.

== See also ==
- 2025 in the European Union
- 2025 in Europe
