= 2024 in Portugal =

- Decades: 2000s; 2010s; 2020s; 2030s
- See also: History of Portugal; Timeline of Portuguese history; List of years in Portugal

Events in the year 2024 in Portugal.

== Incumbents ==
- President: Marcelo Rebelo de Sousa
- Prime Minister – António Costa (Socialist) (until 2 April); Luís Montenegro (Social Democratic) (since 2 April)

== Events ==
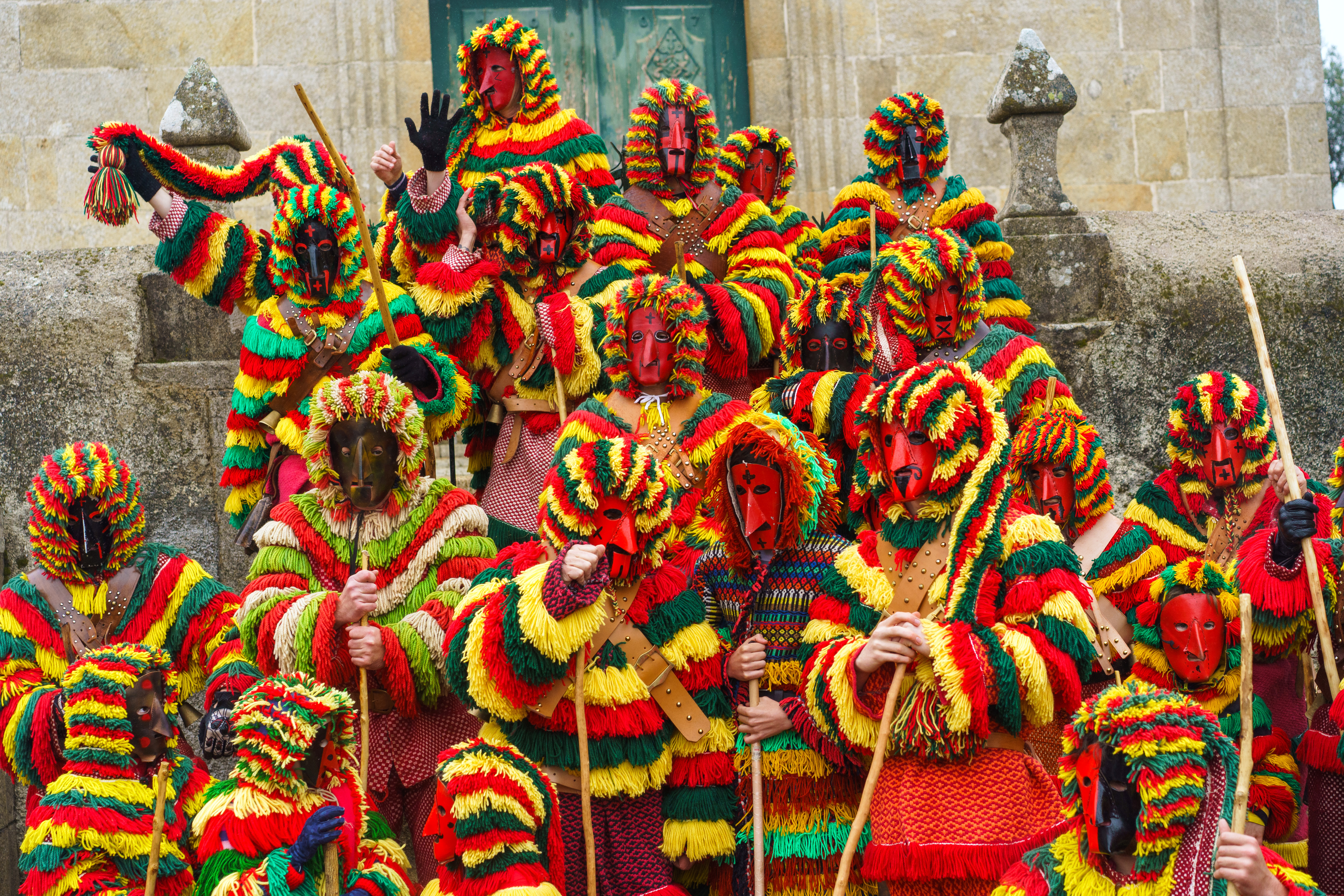
The Carechos of the 2024 Carnaval de Podence in Portugal

=== January ===
- 24 January – The Judiciary Police and the Public Prosecution office conducted a series of searches in Madeira, at the office of the President of the Region, at Funchal City Hall, at private residences and in many private companies, regarding corruption and abuse of power accusations surrounding real estate businesses in the region. The mayor of Funchal was arrested and Miguel Albuquerque, President of the Government of Madeira, was named as a formal suspect.

=== February ===
- 4 February – 2024 Azorean regional election: The PSD/CDS/PPM coalition wins the most votes and seats.

=== March ===
- 10 March – 2024 Portuguese legislative election: The Democratic Alliance wins the most seats, narrowly ahead of the Socialist Party. Far-right Chega gathers 18 percent of the vote.
- 27 March – Madeira's Legislative Assembly is dissolved, following the aftermath of the January police searches, and an election is called for 26 May.

=== April ===
- 2 April – Democratic Alliance leader Luís Montenegro is sworn in as Prime Minister.
- 3–7 April – 2024 European Trampoline Championships.
- 25 April – The country marks the 50-year anniversary of the Carnation Revolution, that established democracy.

=== May ===
- 26 May – 2024 Madeiran regional election: The Social Democratic Party wins, again, the most seats.

=== June ===
- 2 June – Two stunt aircraft collide during a demonstration at the Beja Air Show, killing a pilot.
- 9 June – 2024 European Parliament election: The Socialist Party narrowly polls ahead of the Democratic Alliance.

=== July ===
- 3 July – Three people are killed and three others are reported missing after a fishing boat sinks off the coast of Marinha Grande.

=== August ===
- 21 August – A wildfire in Madeira burns at least 4,937 hectares of land, prompting authorities to issue an emergency appeal for aid from the European Union.
- 26 August – A 5.3 magnitude earthquake in the Richter scale, was felt in all Southern Portugal and the Lisbon metro area. No damages or victims were reported.
- 30 August – Four people are killed and one other is reported missing after a National Republican Guard helicopter crashes into the Douro river in Lamego.

=== September ===
- 7 September – Five inmates escape from the Vale de Judeus high-security prison near Lisbon.
- 17 September –
  - At least nine people are killed in nationwide wildfires. A state of calamity is declared in parts of the country.
  - Six children are injured in a mass stabbing inside a school in Azambuja. The suspect, a 12-year old boy, is arrested.

=== October ===
- 2 October – Three people, two men and a woman, are shot and killed inside a barbershop in Lisbon. The suspect escapes with his family.
- 21 October – Killing of Odair Moniz: The fatal shooting of a man of Cape Verdean origin by police in Amadora leads to violent protests in the Lisbon area.

=== November ===
- 4 November – At least eleven people died allegedly linked to the Emergency medical services strike.
- 29 November – After months of uncertainty, Parliament approves the 2025 State Budget with the votes of the Democratic Alliance and the abstention of the Socialists.

=== December ===
- 11 December – Spain, Portugal and Morocco win the joint hosting rights for the 2030 FIFA World Cup.
- 17 December – A motion of no confidence brings down Madeira's regional government led by Miguel Albuquerque.

== Art and entertainment ==
- List of Portuguese submissions for the Academy Award for Best International Feature Film

== Holidays ==
- 1 January - New Year's Day
- 29 March - Good Friday
- 31 March - Easter Sunday
- 25 April – Freedom Day
- 1 May - Labour Day
- 30 May - Feast of Corpus Christi
- 10 June – Portugal Day
- 15 August - Assumption Day
- 5 October – Republic Day
- 1 November - All Saints' Day
- 1 December – Independence Restoration Day
- 8 December – Immaculate Conception
- 25 December - Christmas Day

== Deaths ==
- 2 January – Alberto Festa, 84, footballer (Porto, Tirsense, national team).
- 4 January – Ana Afonso, 47, model and actress (Quinta das Celebridades).
- 4 January – Antonino Solmer, 73, actor and theatre director.
- 8 January – Arnaldo Trindade, 89, music editor and producer.
- 22 January – Maria da Graça Carmona e Costa, 91, galerist and art collector.
- 4 February – Rui Patrício, 91, politician, minister of Foreign Affairs (1970-1974).
- 8 February – André Jordan, 90, tourism businessman.
- 8 February – João Oliveira Pinto, 52, footballer.
- 16 February – José Pinto, 95, actor (2016 Sophia Awards).
- 18 February – Armando Guedes da Costa, 84, jurist and film producer.
- 22 February – Artur Jorge, 78, footballer and coach (national team).
- 22 February – Hugo Maia de Loureiro, 79, singer (Festival da Canção 1970 and 1971).
- 23 February – Rui Rodrigues, 80, footballer and coach (national team).
- 1 March – Fernando António Pinheiro Correia, 81, journalist (Diário de Lisboa, O Militante).
- 3 March – Alexandre Baptista, 83, footballer.
- 5 March – António-Pedro Vasconcelos, 84, film director.
- 7 March – Minervino Pietra, 70, footballer (national team).
- 8 March – Estrela Novais, 70, actress.
- 11 March – Miguel Gullander, 49, writer and teacher.
- 17 March – Nuno Júdice, 74, poet and essayist.
- 18 March – Joaquim Santos, 71, rally driver.
- 20 March – António Pacheco, 57, footballer.
- 21 March – António Évora, 82, actor.
- 21 March – Gina Santos, 86, actress.
- 3 April – António Marques Miguel, architect and professor.
- 9 April – Eugénio Lisboa, 93, essayist, poet, critic.
- 11 April – António Amorim, 72, geneticist, researcher, professor-emeritus of University of Porto.
- 10 May – Fernando Emílio, 77, sports journalist.
- 16 May – Casimiro de Brito, 86, poet and essayist.
- 24 May – Paulo Lourenço, 52, diplomat, ambassador to Cape Verde.
- 29 May – Santana Castilho, 80, educator and politician.
- 15 June – Maria Quintans, 69, poet and playwright.
- 27 June – Manuel Fernandes, 73, footballer and manager.
- 1 July – Fausto Bordalo Dias, 75, singer, guitarist and composer.
- 9 July – Joana Marques Vidal, 68, prosecutor and Attorney-General (2012-2018).
- 27 July – Mísia, 69, fado singer.
- 28 July – Joana de Barros Baptista, 88, teacher and women's rights activist (Order of Liberty).
- 4 August – João Paulo Guerra, 82, journalist.
- 11 August – José Manuel Constantino, 74, president of the Olympic Committee of Portugal (since 2013).
- 16 August – Álvaro Monjardino, 93, politician, president of the Legislative Assembly of the Azores.
- 17 August – Ana Faria, 74, singer of children's music.
- 28 August – Renato Moura, 75, politician and tax administrator, member of the Legislative Assembly of the Azores.
- 29 August – Adolfo Calisto, 80, football player (Benfica, national team) and manager (CD Alcains).
- 4 September – Fernando José Rodrigues, 67, writer, actor and stage director.
- 5 September – Augusto M. Seabra, 69, music and film critic.
- 9 September – Graça Lobo, 85, stage actress.
- 21 September – Rogério de Carvalho, 87-88, stage director.
- 27 September – João Diogo Nunes Barata, 83, diplomat.
- 16 October – António Sena, 83, plastic artist and painter.
- 17 October – Domingos Pinho, 87, painter.
- 24 October – Marco Paulo, 79, singer.
- 1 November – Camilo Mortágua, 90, antifascist activist.

== See also ==
- 2024 in the European Union
- 2024 in Europe
