= 2023 in Portugal =

- Decades: 2000s; 2010s; 2020s; 2030s
- See also: History of Portugal; Timeline of Portuguese history; List of years in Portugal

Events in the year 2023 in Portugal.

== Incumbents ==
- President: Marcelo Rebelo de Sousa
- Prime Minister: António Costa (Socialist) (resigned 7 November)

== Events ==
- 23 January: Portugal agrees to swap Cape Verde's debt for investments in an environmental and climate fund.
- 28 January: Around 80,000 public school teachers and staff march in Lisbon to demand higher wages and better working conditions, amid the nationwide strikes organized by the Union of All Education Professionals.
- 11 February: Tens of thousands of teachers protest in Lisbon, organized by the FENPROF union, demanding higher pay and career progression.
- 16 February: The Portuguese government announces the end of Portugal’s residence permit for investor program (residency-by-investment program), as well as a ban on new licenses for Airbnbs, due to a severe housing shortage and rising rents.
- 28 March: 2023 Lisbon Ismaili Centre stabbing: Two Portuguese women are killed in a stabbing attack at an Isma'ilism Shia religious centre in Lisbon. Police shoot the suspect, an Afghan man, in the leg at the scene, before arresting him and taking him to a hospital.
- 1-6 August: World Youth Day 2023
- 8 August: 2023 Iberian wildfires: In Portugal, 7,000 hectares of forest have burned down and 1,400 people have been evacuated.
- 7 November: Prime Minister António Costa resigns over a corruption probe.
- 27 November: Multiple environmental groups file a lawsuit in Lisbon against the government for failing to implement its 2021 climate change regulations.
- 29 November: Portugal extends the Non-Habitual Resident tax scheme for foreign residents until the end of 2024, allowing continued tax benefits despite concerns over rising housing prices.

== Deaths ==
- 10 January – Hermenegildo Candeias, 88, Olympic gymnast (1960).
