= Palácio da Justiça =

Palácio da Justiça may refer to:

- Palácio da Justiça (Porto)
- Palácio da Justiça (Coimbra)
