= Lucília Gago =

Attorney general of Portugal

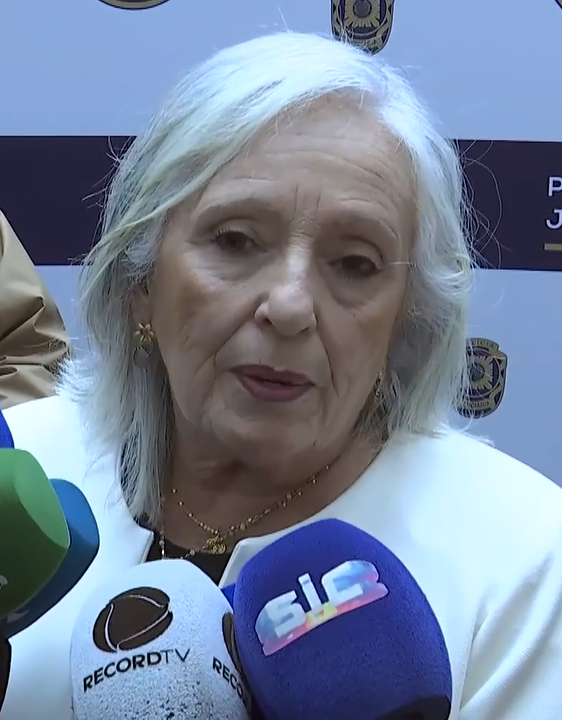
- Lucília Gago

Attorney General of Portugal
- In office 12 October 2018 – 12 October 2024
- Appointed by: Marcelo Rebelo de Sousa
- Preceded by: Joana Marques Vidal
- Succeeded by: Amadeu Guerra

Personal details
- Born: Lucília Maria das Neves Franco Morgadinho Gago; 26 August 1956 (age 70) Lisbon, Portugal
- Education: University of Lisbon

Lucília Maria das Neves Franco Morgadinho Gago (born 26 August 1956) is a Portuguese magistrate who served as the Attorney General of Portugal from 2018 to 2024.

She is a graduate in law from the University of Lisbon. She was director of the Department of Investigation and Criminal Action, between 2016 and 2017, where she worked in the section specialising in economic-financial crime, corruption and money laundering. She was a professor and coordinator of the Judicial Studies Center, between 2012 and 2016.

== Biography ==
A career Public Prosecutor's Magistrate, Gago graduated in law from the University of Lisbon in 1978. She joined the Judicial Studies Center in 1980, following the Public Prosecutor's Office. In 1994 she was promoted to Public Prosecutor, working in the Criminal Courts of Lisbon, in the Department of Investigation and Criminal Action (DIAP) in Lisbon and in the Family and Minors Court of Lisbon.

On 20 September 2018, Gago was appointed by President Marcelo Rebelo de Sousa, following a proposal from the Government led by Prime Minister António Costa, to the position of Attorney General of the Republic, with a term of office of 6 years. She took office at the Belém Palace, before President Rebelo de Sousa, on 12 October 2018.
