= 2027 in Portugal =

- Decades: 2000s; 2010s; 2020s; 2030s
- See also: History of Portugal; Timeline of Portuguese history; List of years in Portugal

Events in the year 2027 in Portugal.

== Events ==
=== Predicted or scheduled ===
- Solar eclipse of August 2, 2027 (partial eclipse)
- World Gymnaestrada 2027
- 2027 Portuguese Grand Pirx

== Holidays ==
- 1 January – New Year's Day
- 3 April – Good Friday
- 5 April – Easter Sunday
- 25 April – Freedom Day
- 1 May – Labour Day
- 4 June – Feast of Corpus Christi
- 10 June – Portugal Day
- 15 August – Assumption Day
- 5 October – Republic Day
- 1 November – All Saints' Day
- 1 December – Independence Restoration Day
- 8 December – Immaculate Conception
- 25 December – Christmas Day
