= 2021 in Portugal =

- Decades: 2000s; 2010s; 2020s; 2030s
- See also: History of Portugal; Timeline of Portuguese history; List of years in Portugal

Events in the year 2021 in Portugal.

== Incumbents ==
- President: Marcelo Rebelo de Sousa
- Prime Minister: António Costa (Socialist)

== Events ==
Ongoing — COVID-19 pandemic in Portugal

- 24 January – 2021 Portuguese presidential election.
- 19 April – Thousands march in Lisbon against a proposed ban of Portuguese far-right party Chega.

== Deaths ==
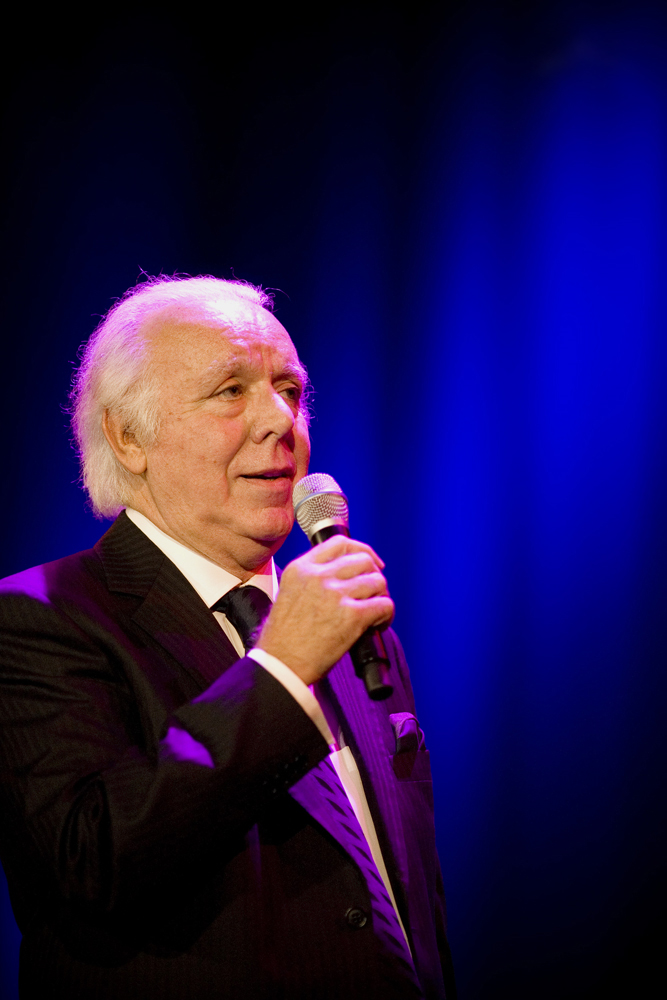
Carlos do Carmo

- 1 January – Carlos do Carmo, fado singer (b. 1939).
- 13 May - Maria João Abreu, actress (b. 1964).
- 25 July – Otelo Saraiva de Carvalho, military officer (b. 1936).
