= Judiciary of Macau =

Administration of justice in Macau

The Judiciary of Macau is responsible for the administration of justice in Macau. It hears all prosecutions and civil disputes, including disputes between individuals and the government. It is fundamental to Macau's legal system that members of the judiciary are independent of the executive and legislative branches of the government. The courts of law in Macau comprise the Court of Final Appeal and 11 other courts. The President of the Court of Final Appeal of the Macau Special Administrative Region is head of the judiciary. A bilingual court system in which Chinese, Portuguese or both can be used was put in place, in accordance with the requirement of the Basic Law.

== List of courts of Macau ==
- Court of Final Appeal (Chinese: 終審法院, Portuguese: Tribunal de Última Instância) - the highest court in Macau. The court consists of 3 judges, one is the Chief Justice.
  - Court of Second Instance (中級法院, Tribunal de Segunda Instância) - consist of 5 judges
    - Primary Court – (Chinese: 初級法院, Tribunal Judícial de Base)
    - Administrative Court – (行政法院, Tribunal Administrativo) - consist of 1 judge

Each court is headed by a chief judge or President.

== Appointment of judges ==
Judges of Macau are appointed by the Chief Executive of Macau with recommendation of an independent commission composed of local judges, lawyers and eminent persons. Most judges are local Macanese, but foreign judges maybe appointed.

== Judiciary dress ==
Judges in Macau wear a simple dark gray/off black robe with a dark sash. Some judges have colour cuffs and waist bands (yellow, red and teal). Suits are worn underneath. It is similar to those worn by Portuguese judges.

== See also ==
- Judiciary of Portugal
