= Operation Royal Amethyst =

1973 military operation in the Portuguese Colonial War in Guinea-Bissau

- Part of Portuguese Colonial War and Guinea-Bissau War of Independence
Date	19 May 1973
Location	Guidaje, Portuguese Guinea
Result	Portuguese victory

Belligerents
Portugal	(Guinea-Bissau) PAIGC

Commanders and leaders
(Portugal) Maj. Almeida Bruno (Portugal) Cap. António Ramos (Portugal) Cap. Matos Gomes (Portugal) Cap. Raúl Folques	(Guinea-Bissau) Unknown

Units involved
(Portugal) Forças Armadas: Portuguese Army; Portuguese Navy; Portuguese Air Force	Unknown

Strength
450 soldiers 1 LDG; 2 LFDs	Unknown

Casualties and losses
10 killed 22 wounded 3 missing	67 guerrillas killed (2 Cubans and 4 Mauritanians)

Operation Royal Amethyst was a military operation carried out by the Portuguese Guinean Battalion of Commandos, which was held on 8 May 1973 in the course of the Colonial War in Guinea-Bissau, which had the purpose of "annihilating or at least dismantling the organisation of the guerrillas in the region of Guidaje-Bigene".

== Background ==
The operation divided the battalion into three groups:

- "Romeu Grouping"-1st Company of Commandos- Captain António Ramos
- "Bombox Grouping"-2nd Company of Commandos- Captain Matos Gomes
- "Centauro Grouping"-3rd Company of Commandos- Captain Raul Folques

After embarkation of the Battalion of Commandos onto a Large Landing Craft (LDG), which was then escorted by two LFDs the unit landed in Ganturé and attended a briefing in Bigene.

== The Operation ==
The operation began at 11:50 pm north. The first contact with the forces of the PAIGC was triggered by the Bombox Group after initial aerial bombardment by Fiat G.91 aircraft.

At 5:30 am on 19 May, the column's head reached the route that supported the Cumbamori base, the main objective of the operation. The Bombox Group passed north of the road, the Centauro Group occupied positions to the south and the Grouping Romeu was installed in the rear, in a small town.

At 8:00 am and 8:00 pm, air strikes were conducted by Fiat G.91 fighter-bombers, which destroyed the base's bunkers, and the guerrillas munitions were on fire for a period of time.

At 9:05 am the Bombox Group performed the initial assault, causing the first contact with the PAIGC forces. This fighting took place from the 14th and 10th, when the commander of the operation ordered the Centauro Group to support a rupture of contact between its forces and those of the PAIGC. It was an operation of great difficulty, because the fighters on both sides were very close to each other. The Centaur Group commander was wounded.

At 14:30, the Commando Battalion began to move to the collection base, and at 6:20 pm its first elements arrived in Guidaje. On 20 May the battalion left Guidaje for Sinta, on foot, leaving there their wounded and the military who were not in conditions to continue the march. In Sinta, the battalion embarked on an LDG to return to Bissau.

== Aftermath ==
During the operation, the Battalion suffered ten troops killed, twenty-two troops seriously wounded, and three troops missing, estimated to have caused sixty-seven deaths, among which, according to information later obtained in Senegal, a Cuban physician and surgeon and four Mauritanians.
