= Judiciary of Portugal =

Overview of court system in Portugal

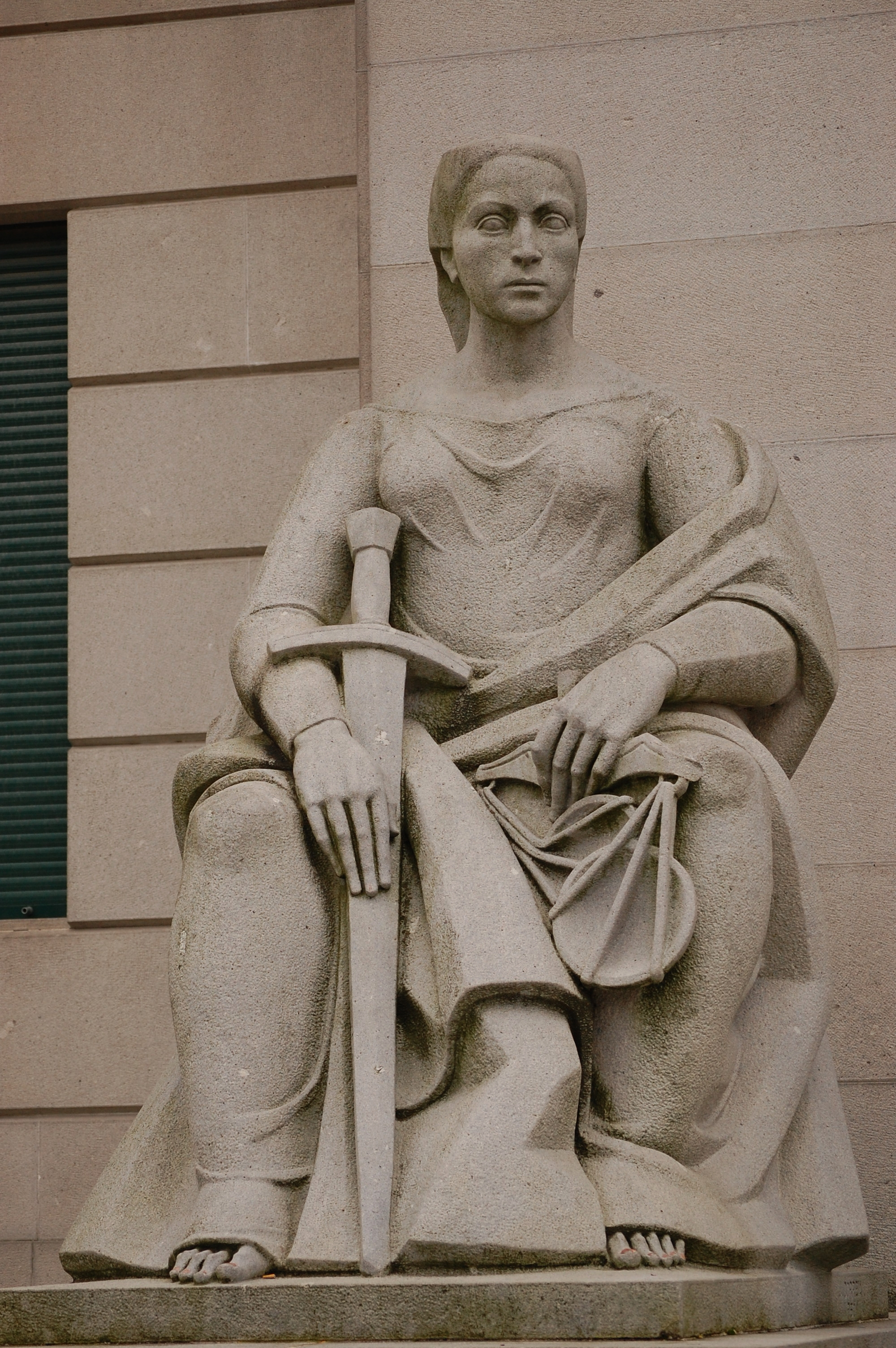
Statue of Lady Justice, at Guimarães Palace of Justice.

The judiciary of Portugal is a system of courts that together constitute one of the four organs of Sovereignty as defined by the Portuguese Constitution. The courts are independent from the other three Portuguese organs of Sovereignty (President of the Republic, Government and Assembly of the Republic).

The Portuguese courts are divided by four independent orders, each of which corresponds to the separate Constitutional, Judicial, Administrative and Auditors jurisdictions.

The public prosecution and the representation of the State before the courts is assured by an independent body of magistrates, known as Public Ministry.

The Ministry of Justice is the Government department responsible for the administration of the Judiciary system.

== Orders of courts ==
The Portuguese judiciary system is not unitary, but it is instead divided in four independent categories or orders of courts: Constitutional, Judicial, Administrative and Auditors. Each order contains their own structure of courts. The Constitutional and Auditors orders include a single court each one, while the other two orders include a plurality of hierarchical organized courts. Until 2003, a fifth order of courts existed, this being the Military Jurisdiction.

A higher court of appeal exists to appreciate and judge the conflicts of jurisdiction between the Judicial and Administrative orders of courts, this being the Conflicts Court (Portuguese: Tribunal de Conflitos). The Conflicts Court is headed by the president of the Supreme Administrative Court, including also other three judges of this court and three judges of the Supreme Court of Justice.

=== Constitutional Court ===
The Constitutional Court (Tribunal Constitucional) is the sole court in the Constitutional jurisdiction. It is a special court, mainly tasked with reviewing the constitutionality of newly approved laws, but it also has important powers related to the President of the Republic, the political parties and referendums. The judges of the Constitutional Court are independent from the other branches of government, such as the executive or the legislature, and cannot be impeached. The court is installed in the Ratton Palace in Lisbon.

=== Judicial courts ===
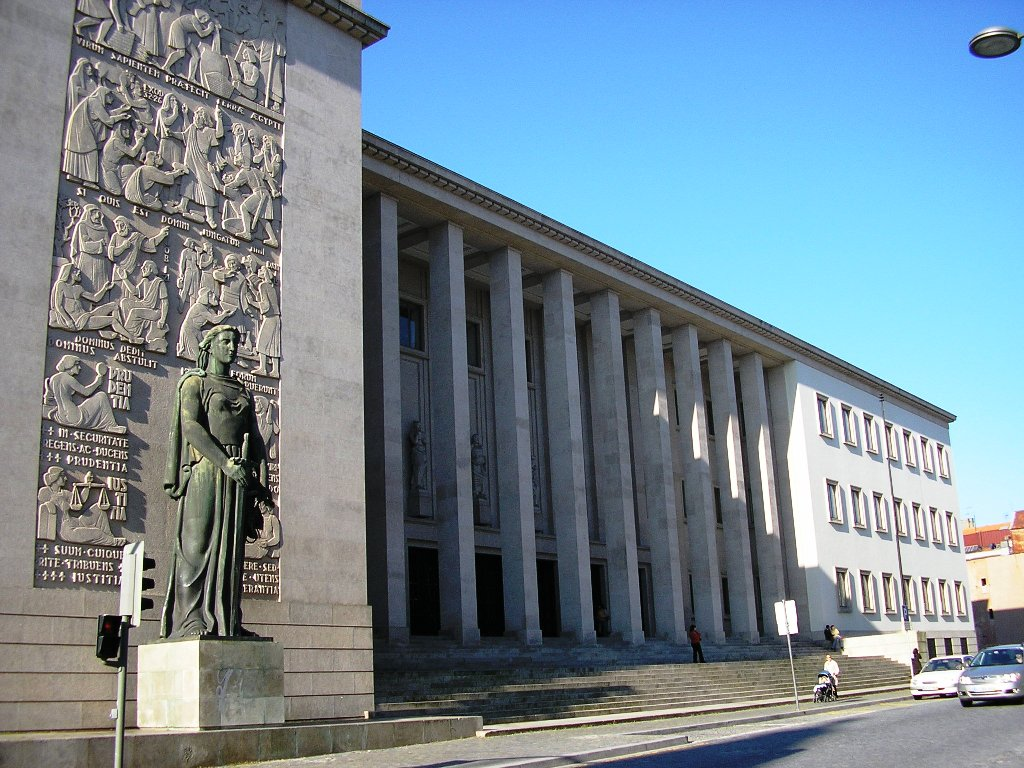
The Palace of Justice of Porto, seat of the Relação and of the Court of Justice of the Comarca of Porto, with the statue of Lady Justice in the front.

The Judicial order (Ordem Judicial) is the first category of common courts (excluding the Constitutional Court), forming a proper hierarchical structure that has the Supreme Court of Justice (Supremo Tribunal de Justiça) in Lisbon as its superior body. This order also includes the five intermediate level courts called Relação (Guimarães, Porto, Coimbra, Lisbon and Évora) and the judicial courts of first instance. The judicial courts of first instance can be courts of generic competence or courts of specific competence.

For the purpose of the Judicial order, until 2014, Portugal was divided in 231 uneven comarcas, constituting the territorial areas of jurisdiction of the courts of first instance. With some adjustments carried away over the years, that division was essentiality the one established in the judiciary reform of 1835. Depending on the size of its population, each comarca could have from a single court of general jurisdiction with just a single judge to a complex structure of diverse courts of special jurisdiction (civil, criminal, criminal procedure, labour, family, etc.), each of which, by itself, could include several specialized sections and judgeships. The comarcas were grouped in 57 judicial circles (círculos judiciais) and these in four judicial districts (distritos judiciais).

Following the judiciary organization reform of 2014, the country is now divided in 23 larger comarcas, all of them having, each one, a single judicial court of first instance, with general jurisdiction. Each judicial court is divided in judgeships (juízos), with the following types existing: central civil, local civil, central criminal, local criminal, local minor crimes, criminal procedure, labor, family and juvenile, commercial, execution, general jurisdiction and proximity.

The comarca courts are typically installed in monumental courthouses, called palácios da Justiça (palaces of Justice), many of them built between the 1940s and the 1960s. Before the reduction of the number of comarcas due to the 2014 reform, each palace of Justice was usually a seat of a court, but now most of them are only seats of judgeships of larger courts.

Besides the 23 generic competence judicial courts of each comarca, there are also some subject-matter jurisdiction courts of first instance that have territorial jurisdiction over several comarcas. These include the penal supervisory courts of Porto, Coimbra, Lisbon and Évora, the Maritime Court at Lisbon, the Intellectual Property Court at Lisbon, the Concurrency, Regulation and Supervision Court at Santarém and the Central Criminal Procedure Court at Lisbon.

The judges of the Supreme Court of Justice have the title of conselheiros (counselors), those of the Relações have the title of desembargadores and those of the courts of first instance have the title of juízes de direito (judges of law).

As Justice of first instance, there are also the judges of peace and the arbitral tribunals. The judges of peace have competence to appreciate and to judge small actions regarding values that do not exceed the ceiling below which it is not possible to appeal from a court of first instance.

=== Administrative and tax courts ===
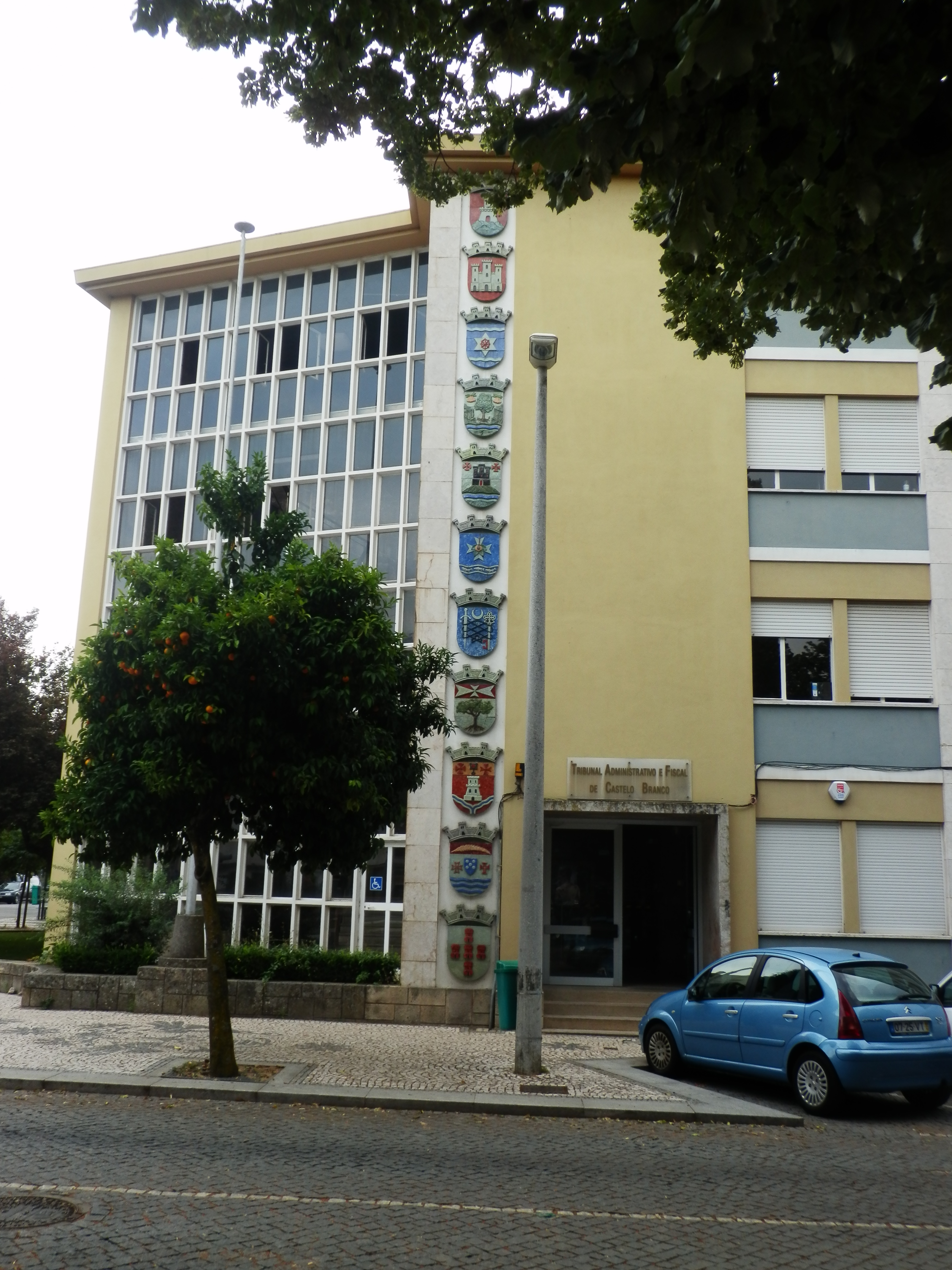
Administrative and Tax Court of Castelo Branco.

The administrative and tax order includes the courts that deal with the administrative law and with the tax law. They constitute a hierarchical system that has the Supreme Administrative Court (Supremo Tribunal Administrativo) in Lisbon as its superior body. This order also includes the second instance central administrative courts of North at Porto and of South at Lisbon, as well as the courts of first instance.

For the purpose of the administrative and tax jurisdiction, the country is territorially divided in 16 circles. To each of the circles correspond a first instance administrative court of circle and a tributary court, being that both of which may be aggregated, in that case being unitarily designated "administrative and tax courts". At the present, only the Lisbon circle has a separate administrative and a tributary court, with the rest of the circles each having a single administrative and tax court.

The judges of the Supreme Administrative Court have the title of conselheiros, those of the central administrative courts have the title of desembargadores and those of the first instance courts have the title of juízes de direito.

=== Auditors Court ===
The logo of the Portuguese Court of Auditors

The Auditors Court (Tribunal de Contas) is the single court of its order. It has both pure court functions (namely the supervision of the legality of the public expenses and the judging of public accounting) and also advising functions (namely to give opinion about the State accounts, alloying the Parliament to analyze them and decide).

The judges of the Auditors Court are chosen through civil service examination and have the title of conselheiros (counselors).

=== Military courts ===
Until 2003, Portugal had a system of permanent military courts that dealt with the military justice, which constituted a separate jurisdiction. The superior body of this order of courts was the Supreme Military Court (Supremo Tribunal Militar) in Lisbon. As lower instance courts of military justice, several territorial military courts and the Naval Military Court also existed.

With the approval of the new Portuguese Code of Military Justice on 15 November 2003, the permanent military courts were disbanded, ceasing to exist during the time of peace. In time of peace, the military crimes or the crimes committed by military personnel are now judged in the criminal sections of the common Judicial courts. For the propose of military justice, there are four military judges (one for each branch of the Armed Forces and the other for the National Republican Guard) in each of the following courts: the Supreme Court of Justice, the Relação of Lisbon and the Relação of Porto.

However, in times of war, separate military courts can be re-established. These can be ordinary or extraordinary. The ordinary courts are the Supreme Military Court, the military courts of 2nd instance and the military courts of 1st instance. The military ordinary courts would be composed of the military judges that usually serve in the criminal sections of the common Judicial courts. The extraordinary military courts are non-permanent courts created, near military forces or installations outside the national territory or national waters, only to judge specific processes, being dissolved as soon as these are decided. Each of these courts would be composed by members of the military with a higher rank than the defendants and by a person with a degree in Law (preferable a judge, if available).

== Public Ministry ==
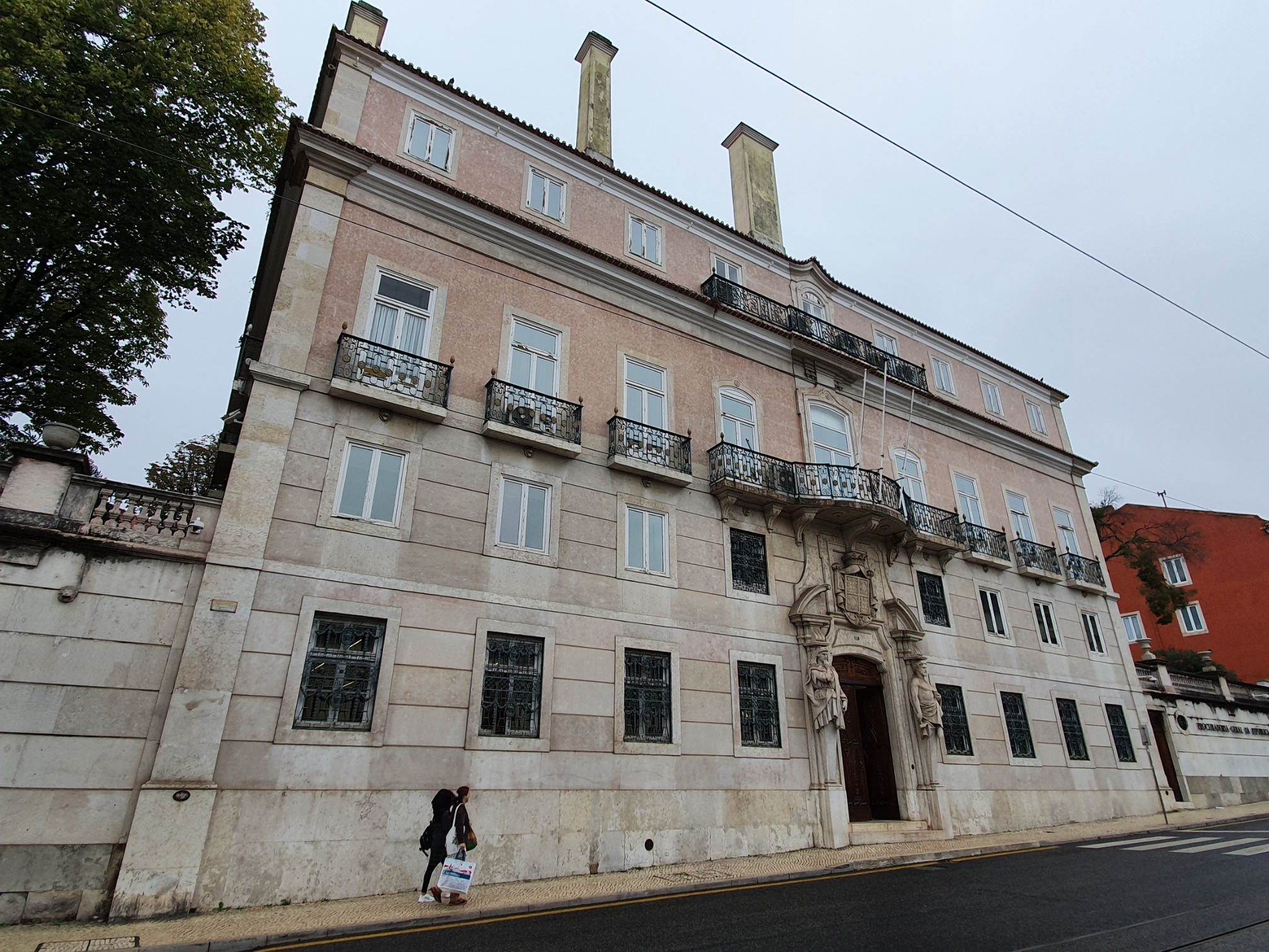
Palmela Palace, seat of the Portuguese Attorney-General's Office.

The Public Ministry (MP, Ministério Público) is the Judiciary body responsible for the public prosecution and the representation of the Portuguese State before the courts. It is an hierarchic organized body, composed of magistrates and headed by the Attorney-General of the Republic (Procurador-Geral da República), being totally independent from the executive and other branches of Government.

The superior body of the Public Ministry is the Procuradoria-Geral da República (PGR, Attorney-General's Office), headed by the Attorney-General. Besides directing the MP, the PGR also assures its representation in the four supreme courts: Constitutional Court, Supreme Court of Justice, Supreme Administrative Court and Auditors Court. This representation is done directly by the Attorney-General, assisted by the Vice-Attorney-General and by deputy attorneys-general.

The intermediate level bodies of the MP are the four procuradorias-gerais distritais (district attorneys-general's offices) and the two procuradorias-gerais de coordenação (coordinating attorneys-general's offices). The first represent the MP in the relação courts, while the last represent it in the central administrative courts.

The first level bodies of the MP are the 23 procuradorias de comarca (comarca attorney's offices), which represent it in each of the judicial courts of comarca.

One of the main roles of the Public Ministry is to guide the criminal investigation in the country. For this role, the MP includes the departments of investigation and prosecution, composed of attorneys specially dedicated to the investigation of the most serious crimes. There is one central department in the PGR and one of such departments in each of the district attorneys-general's offices. For the criminal investigation, the MP also controls the activity of the Judiciary Police.

== Ministry of Justice ==
The Ministry of Justice (Ministério da Justiça) is the department of the Government of Portugal responsible to conceive, conduct, execute and assess the Justice policy defined by the Assembly of the Republic and by the Government and to assure the relationship of the Government with the courts, the Public Ministry, the Higher Council of Magistrates and the Higher Council of the Administrative and Tax Courts. As part of its responsibilities, it administers the judiciary system, with functions that include the payment of salaries and the construction of courthouses.

It is headed by the minister of Justice, who is a member of the Portuguese Cabinet.

On the contrary of what happens in other countries, the Portuguese minister of Justice is not the head of public prosecution, not having any kind of authority over the attorneys of the Public Ministry, who are independent magistrates.

== Judiciary professions ==
=== Judges ===
The judges are the independent magistrates that judge accordingly with the Portuguese Constitution and the law.

There are two separate bodies of career judges, that are part of the civil service. The first one is the Judicial Magistrates Corps, that is formed by the judges who serve in the Judicial courts. The superior body of this Corps is the Higher Council of Magistracy, presided by the President of the Supreme Court of Justice. The other is the body of Judges of the Administrative and Tax Jurisdiction. This is headed by the Higher Council of the Administrative and Tax Courts, presided by the President of the Supreme Administrative Court. Although independent of each other, the two bodies of career judges share many characteristics. Both have the same categories of judges, that are those of conselheiro (counselor), desembargador and juíz de direito (judge of Law), corresponding, respectively to the judges of the supreme, second instance and first instance courts.

The access to the careers of judges implies the graduation in a special school of magistrates, the Judicial Studies Center or CEJ. The admission to the CEJ is made through civil service examination. Previous conditions for admission is to be National of Portugal or of another Portuguese Speaking Country, to have a degree in Law and to fulfill all the conditions to be a public servant.

The judges of the Constitutional Court and of the Accountants Court are not career judges. The majority of those of the first court are chosen by the Assembly of the Republic and the rest by co-optation. Those of the Accountants Court are chosen through civil service examination.

=== Public Ministry magistrates ===
The attorneys of the Public Ministry are magistrates as the judges, but constitute a parallel and independent body from the Judicial Magistracy.

The career of the magistrates of the Public Ministry includes the following categories: procurador-geral-adjunto (deputy attorney-general), procurador da República (attorney) and procurador-adjunto (deputy attorney).

The Procurador-Geral da República (attorney-general) has also the status of the magistrate while in office, but it is not mandatory that the Procurador-Geral da República had been a Public Ministry magistrate before being appointed for the role. The Vice-Procurador-Geral da República (vice-attorney-general) is a magistrate with mandatory origin in the Public Ministry career magistracy.

The Public Ministry is represented by the Procurador-Geral da República and by procuradores-gerais-adjuntos before the Supreme Court of Justice, the Constitutional Court, the Supreme Administrative Court and the Accountants Court. It is represented by procuradores-gerais-adjuntos before the relações and the central administrative courts. Before the first instance courts, it is represented by procuradores-gerais-adjuntos, procuradores da República and procuradores-adjuntos.

The access to the career of Public Ministry magistrate obeys to the same previous conditions as the access to the careers of judges, also implying the graduation in the Centro de Estudos Judiciários.

=== Barristers and solicitors ===
The barristers (advogados) and solicitors (solicitadores) are the legal practitioners who represent the natural and legal persons before the courts and deal with other legal matters.

The legal representation by a barrister is considered an essential element in the administration of Justice and is admissible in any proceedings. It can not be prevented before any jurisdiction, authority, or public or private entity.

Both the professions of barrister and solicitor are statutory regulated and represented by public professional associations, respectively the Ordem dos Advogados (Order of the Barristers) and the Câmara dos Solicitadores (Chamber of the Solicitors). Being member of those professional associations is a mandatory condition for the practice of the professions of barrister or solicitor. The admission to the professional associations implies the previous graduation in Law (or alternatively having a solicitor's degree in the case of solicitors candidates), performing an internship and passing in access examinations.

=== Officers of Justice ===
The officers of Justice constitute the special class of public servants that serve in the secretaries of the courts and of the Public Ministry offices. Their roles include the providing of the administrative services of the Judiciary, the execution of warrants, the service of scrivener in the trials and the function of criminal police in the inquiries.

The career of officer of Justice of the courts includes the categories of escrivão de direito (scrivener of Law), escrivão-adjunto (deputy scrivener) and escrivão auxiliar (auxiliary scrivener). Regarding the career of officer of Justice of the Public Ministry, it includes the categories of técnico de Justiça principal (principal technician of Justice), técnico de Justiça-adjunto (deputy technician of Justice) and técnico de Justiça auxiliar (auxiliary technician of Justice).

== See also ==
- Public Ministry
- Law of Portugal
- Judicial Studies Center
- Judiciary of Brazil
- Judiciary of Macau
