= Pedro Massano =

Portuguese illustrator (1948–2025)

Manuel Pedro Dias Massano Santos (15 August 1948 – 1 September 2025) was a Portuguese journalist, editor, illustrator, author, critic and comic book promoter.

== Life and career ==
Massano was born in Lisbon on 15 August 1948. He attended the Architecture course at ESBAL (Lisbon School of Fine Arts), during the 1970s. His first published comic was "BZZZ", which appeared in the supplement Mosca, in Diário de Lisboa, in 1972, signing then as Mané (incidentally, the signature in his works had other nuances, such as Pedro or Manuel Pedro).

Throughout his career, he published a number of comic strips, across a number of publications, including Visão, Eco Regional and Selecções BD.

Massano died on 1 September 2025, at the age of 77.
