= Fernando Pinto Monteiro =

Portuguese lawyer, magistrate, and judge (1942–2022)

Attorney General of Portugal
- In office 9 October 2006 – 12 October 2012
- Preceded by: José Souto de Moura
- Succeeded by: Joana Marques Vidal

Personal details
- Born: Fernando José de Matos Pinto Monteiro; 5 April 1942 Porto de Ovelha, Almeida, Portugal
- Died: 8 June 2022 (aged 80)
- Education: University of Coimbra

Fernando José de Matos Pinto Monteiro GCC (5 April 1942 – 8 June 2022) was a Portuguese lawyer, magistrate and judge.

He served as Attorney General of the Republic of Portugal from 2006 to 2012.

== Controversies ==
Suspicions were raised when Monteiro had lunch with former Prime Minister José Sócrates a few days before his arrest on 22 November 2014 on suspicion of tax fraud, money laundering, and corruption.

On 25 March 2015, he was accused over Antena 1 by the President of the Union of Magistrates of the Public Ministry António Ventinhas of impeding investigations of politicians.
