= José Rodrigo =

Portuguese politician (1934–2026)

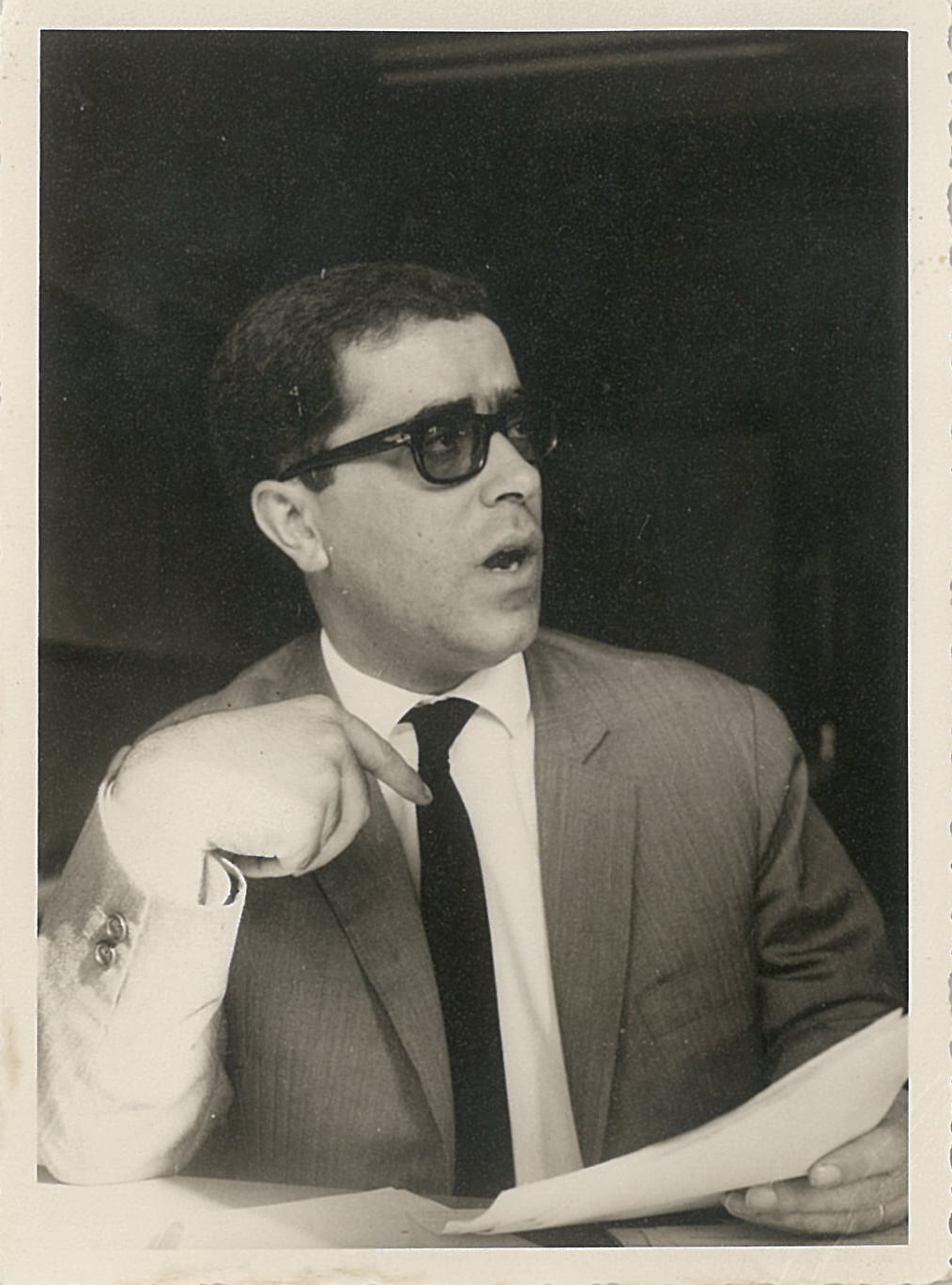

Member of the Assembly of the Republic of Portugal for Porto
- In office 4 November 1985 – 12 August 1987

Personal details
- Born: José Rodrigo Carneiro da Costa Carvalho; 6 September 1934 Amarante, Portugal
- Died: 13 January 2026 (aged 91) Porto, Portugal
- Party: PRD
- Education: University of Porto
- Occupation: Journalist

José Rodrigo Carneiro da Costa Carvalho (6 September 1934 – 13 January 2026) was a Portuguese politician. A member of the Democratic Renewal Party, he served in the Assembly of the Republic from 1985 to 1987.

Rodrigo died in Porto on 13 January 2026, at the age of 91.
