= Raquel Seruca =

Portuguese oncobiologist (1962–2022)

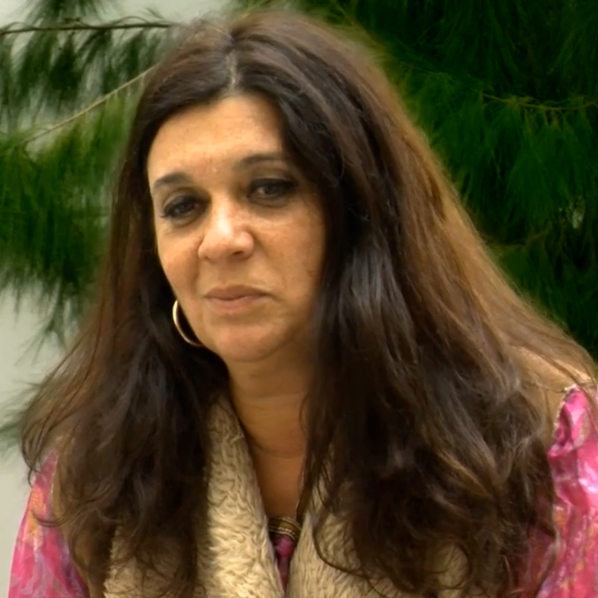
- Seruca in 2013
- Born: 1962; Porto, Portugal
- Died: 29 May 2022 (aged 59); Porto, Portugal
- Occupation: oncobiologist
- Known for: her work on stomach cancer

Raquel Seruca (1962 – 29 May 2022) was a Portuguese oncobiologist known for her work on stomach cancer.

== Life ==
Seruca was born and raised in Porto. She graduated in medicine at the University of Porto before obtaining a PhD in the molecular genetics of stomach cancer in 1995. She was supervised by Manuel Sobrinho Simões. She was then a fellow at the University of Groningen in the human genetics department.

Seruca and Joana Paredes led a team that obtained funding three times from the charity No Stomach For Cancer in 2015, 2017, and 2021 for their research work to create tests to identify mutations in the Caderin-E gene, which is responsible for inherited stomach cancer.

She died in 2022.

== Awards and recognition ==
She was decorated by the Portuguese government with the insignia of Grand Officer of the Order of Infante D. Henrique, in 2009, for her contribution to the study of stomach cancer. She was awarded the Benjamin Castelman Award (USCAP) in 2001 and 2012. She received the Medal of Scientific Merit from the Porto City Council in 2014. In the same year, she was awarded the Femina Award for Merit in Science. In 2021, she won the ACTIVA Women Inspiring Science Award for her contribution to the Comprehensive Cancer Center.

The Porto Comprehensive Cancer Center was renamed the Porto Raquel Seruca Comprehensive Cancer Center in her honor.
