= Joana Lopes =

Portuguese systems engineer and anti-fascist (1938–2026)

Joana Lopes Alves (11 October 1938 – 5 February 2026) was a Portuguese systems engineer and anti-fascist.

== Life and career ==
Maria Joana de Menezes Lopes was born on 11 October 1938 in Lourenço Marques (now Maputo) in Mozambique, attending high school in Portugal.

She was a professor of logic and other subjects in the philosophy department at the Faculty of Arts of the University of Lisbon from 1965 to 1971. Later, she became a computer programmer, working as a systems engineer for IBM in Portugal and Belgium. She was the first woman to join the executive board of the company in Portugal.

In Leuven, through the process of independence of the Democratic Republic of the Congo (formerly Belgian Congo) she had her first contact with anti-colonial political activity, with MPLA leaders who lived in Paris.

In 1964, she was one of the founding members of the Pragma Cooperative that PIDE closed in 1967. In 1968, she was part of what is considered the first collective affirmation of Catholics against the colonial war, on the last day of the year, in which 150 people gathered all night in the Church of São Domingos.

She was also director of the National Center of Culture, with José Manuel Galvão Teles in 1969.

Lopes died in Lisbon on 5 February 2026, at the age of 87.
