= José Maria Ricciardi =

Portuguese banker (1954–2026)

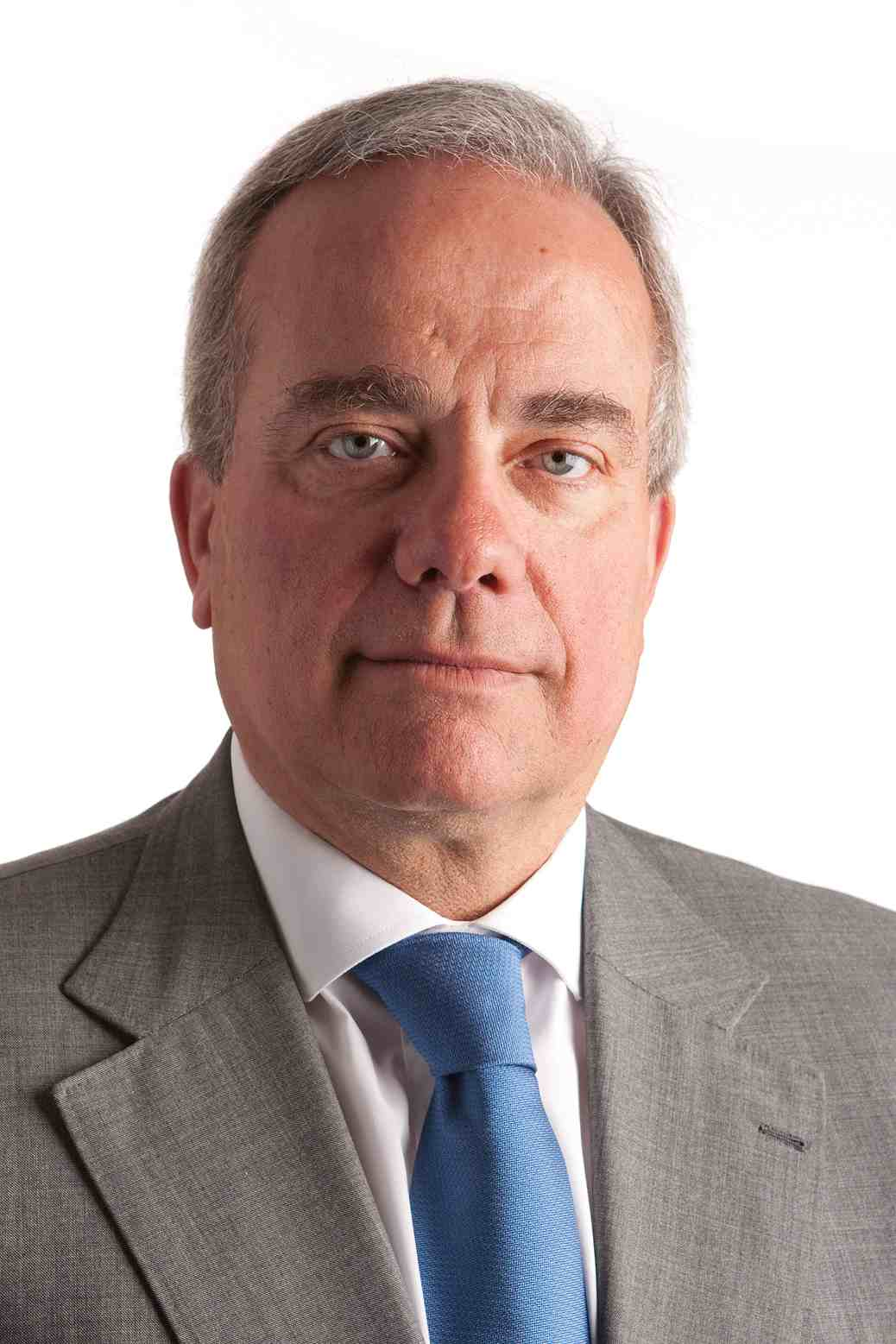
- Born: 27 October 1954
- Died: 25 March 2026
- Occupation: Economist
- Employer(s): Haitong Bank, S.A.

José Maria Espírito Santo Silva Ricciardi (27 October 1954 – 25 March 2026) was a Portuguese economist and banker.

== Life and career ==
Ricciardi had a degree in Sciences Economiques Appliqués from the Institute of Business Administration of the Catholic University of Louvain in Belgium. His final Thesis was on "La Banque et la Prise de Décision d'Octroi de Crédits d'Investissement". He graduated with honors.19

He dedicated a great part of his professional career to the banking sector. In the late 70s, he joined Banco Inter-Atlântico, SA in Rio de Janeiro. Between 1981 and 1983 he was financial controller at the European headquarters of the Espírito Santo Group (GES), ensuring the role of Assistant to the General Financial Controller of GES worldwide. In 1983, he assumed the position of Deputy Director of Banco Espírito Santo International Limited and later in 1987 was appointed Director of the Merchant Banking Division at Banco Internacional de Crédito, S.A (BIC).

At the start of the 1990s, José Maria Ricciardi acted as Deputy General Director of the Direcção Geral de Empresas and Director of Capital Markets Division of Banco Internacional de Crédito (BIC). The entry into investment banking happened in 1992, year in which he was appointed Director of Espirito Santo Sociedade de Investimentos, SA (ESSI), today known as Haitong Bank, S.A. Three years later, he assumed the vice-presidency of the Board of Directors of the Bank, but only in 2003 assumed the position that he held as Chief Executive Officer.

Ricciardi died on 25 March 2026, at the age of 71.

== Public recognition ==
In the end of 2012, during the Year of Portugal in Brazil, in the celebration of the 101st anniversary of the Portuguese Chamber of Commerce and Industry of Rio de Janeiro, José Maria Ricciardi received the title of "Entrepreneur of the Year in Portugal".

In 2013, José Maria Ricciardi was honored with the award "Business Expansion Award", presented by HE the Minister of State for Trade and Investment, Lord Green in recognition of the contribution of Espírito Santo Investment Bank (BESI), as an investor in the UK market and present in the "City". Days later, at the invitation of British Prime Minister David Cameron, he participated in the "Global Investment Conference 2013", an initiative that integrates the meeting of finance ministers – G7 and is part of the "UK's Presidency – G8".

In September 2013, José Maria Ricciardi was honored by the financial publication, World Finance, as "Banker of the Year in Europe".

In July 2016, José Maria Ricciardi was honored by the financial publications, World Finance, as "Banker of the Year in Europe" for his role in the acquisition of BESI by Haitong Securities and for his role in Haitong Bank's expansion.
