= Clara Pinto-Correia =

Portuguese-born novelist, journalist and educator (1960–2025)

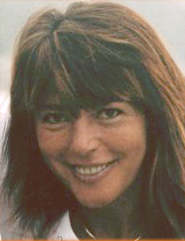
Clara Pinto-Correia

Clara Pinto-Correia (30 January 1960 – 9 December 2025) was a Portuguese novelist, journalist and educator.

== Life and career ==
The daughter of a physician, she was born in Lisbon and earned a doctorate in cellular biology from the University of Porto. She was an adjunct professor in Veterinary and Animal Sciences at the University of Massachusetts Amherst. She wrote a weekly column for the Portuguese newspaper Diário de Notícias.

In 1984, she published her first novel Watercress (Agrião), followed by Goodbye Princess (Adeus, Princesa) in 1985. Adeus, Princesa was made into a movie in 1992.

Pinto-Correia died on 9 December 2025, at the age of 65.

== Recording from the Library of Congress ==
Clara Pinto Correia reading from her work
