= Maria Carrilho =

Portuguese politician (1943–2022)

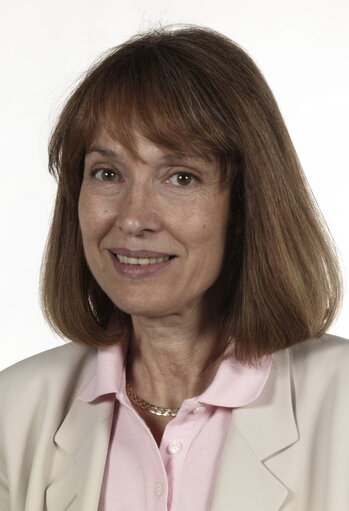

Member of the Assembly of the Republic of Portugal
- In office 10 March 2005 – 14 October 2009
- In office 27 October 1995 – 20 July 1999

Member of the European Parliament
- In office 20 July 1999 – 19 July 2004
- Constituency: Portugal

Personal details
- Born: Maria Jesuína Carrilho Bernardo; 25 November 1943 Beja, Portugal
- Died: 6 February 2022 (aged 78) Lisbon, Portugal
- Party: PS
- Education: Sapienza University of Rome; Technical University of Lisbon

Maria Jesuína Carrilho Bernardo (25 November 1943 – 6 February 2022) was a Portuguese politician.

A member of the Socialist Party, she served in the Assembly of the Republic from 1995 to 1999 and again from 2005 to 2009. She was also a member of the European Parliament from 1999 to 2004.

She died in Lisbon on 6 February 2022, at the age of 78.
