= João de Almeida Bruno =

Portuguese military judge (1935–2022)

President of the Supremo Tribunal Militar
- In office 4 May 1994 – 4 May 1998

Personal details
- Born: 30 July 1935 Lisbon, Portugal
- Died: 10 August 2022 (aged 87) Lisbon, Portugal
- Education: Military Academy
- Occupation: Military judge

João de Almeida Bruno (30 July 1935 – 10 August 2022) was a Portuguese military judge. He served as president of the Supremo Tribunal Militar from 1994 to 1998.

== Career ==
As a member of the general staff under then military governor António de Spínola, on 8 March 1972 Almeida Bruno commanded Operation Royal Amethyst, which aimed to disrupt and destroy the forces of the African Party for the Independence of Guinea and Cape Verde (PAIGC) in Kumbamori, Senegal. To achieve this, he divided his battalion into three groups, respectively commanded by Captain Carlos Manuel Serpa de Matos Gomes, Raul Folques, and Captain António Ramos. The latter group also included then Second Lieutenant Marcelino da Mata. The operation was considered successful, resulting in significant damage to PAIGC facilities and equipment with minimal Portuguese casualties.

On 16 March 1974, he took part in the Caldas uprising, an attempted military coup to overthrow the Estado Novo regime. His former commander Spínola, whose book Portugal e o Futuro had inspired many of the plotters, commented afterwards that "the boys acted too hastily". Almeida Bruno was arrested by the PIDE, which had orders to kill him if he resisted arrest. He was released during the Carnation Revolution on 25 April 1974.

In 1975, he was involved in the failed 11 March coup attempt, again under the command of Spínola. He approached Colonel Jaime Neves, commander of the Commando Battalion in Amadora, to inform him about the imminent attack on RAL-1, the initial phase of the coup, and tasked him with securing the 25 de Abril Bridge, the Rádio Clube Português facilities, and blocking any troop movements from the Operational Infantry Regiment in Queluz. Neves, however, decided not to participate once he learned that the Cavalry Practical School in Santarém would not be involved, and he instead alerted the Operational Command of the Continent (COPCON). Almeida Bruno sided with Neves and subsequently refused to communicate further with Spínola during the attempted coup. He later claimed he was unaware of the conspiracy and had gone to Amadora to discuss matters related to the formation of the Commandos Association, a statement contradicted by Jaime Neves himself.

Following orders from Otelo Saraiva de Carvalho, commander of COPCON, Almeida Bruno presented himself again at the Commando Regiment in Amadora, where he was detained. He was released on 25 November 1975 during the political crisis and was reinstated in the armed forces.

== Death ==
Almeida died in Lisbon on 10 August 2022, at the age of 87.
