= Hermenegildo Candeias =

Portuguese gymnast (1934–2023)

- Full name: Hermenegildo de Almeida Candeias
- Born: 17 April 1934 Oeiras, Portugal
- Died: 10 January 2023 (aged 88)
- Height: 1.62 m (5 ft 4 in)

Gymnastics career
- Discipline: Men's artistic gymnastics
- Country represented: Portugal
- Club: Ginásio Clube Português

Hermenegildo de Almeida Candeias (17 April 1934 – 10 January 2023) was a Portuguese gymnast. He competed in six events at the 1960 Summer Olympics.

Candeias died on 10 January 2023, at the age of 88.
