= José Da Silva Costa =

Portuguese businessman and politician (1951 - 2022)

José da Silva Costa (14 March 1951, Cesar, Oliveira de Azeméis - 28 October 2022, Porto) was a Portuguese economist, professor, researcher, and consultant.

Costa holds a degree in economics by the University of Porto (1973), and a PhD in economics by the University of South Carolina (1984). He embraced an academic career as a tenured university professor in the Faculdade de Economia da Universidade do Porto (FEP) (Economics School of the University of Porto). He presided over the destinies of the College of Economics at the University of Porto, having been the longest-serving dean at the University of Porto's FEP College. He has contributed extensively to fora on Higher Education in Portugal and in Europe, Regional Development, Local, Regional and National Finance, Macroeconomics and Public Choice. These contributions are published in major specialized journals and books as well as in the press.

He was awarded the “Bartolomeu Perestrelo Prize” by the Portuguese Regional Association in 2012. He served as President of the Portuguese Association of Regional Development and Chairman of the General Assembly of the North Regional Section of the Order of Economists.

He is married and has one daughter.
