= Monsagro =

- Municipality
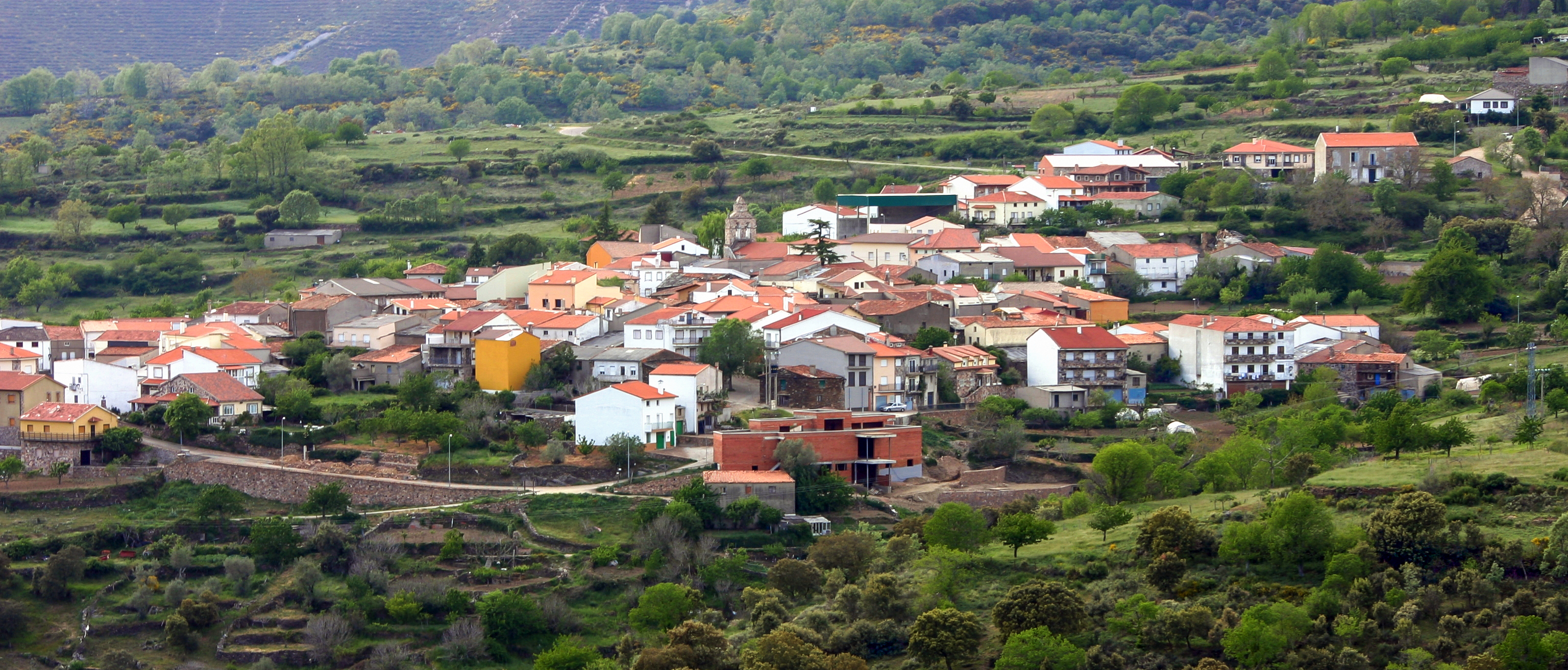

- Coat of arms

- Location in Salamanca
- Coordinates: 40°30′17″N 6°16′18″W
- Country: Spain
- Autonomous community: Castile and León
- Province: Salamanca

Government
  - Mayor: Francisco Ángel Mateos Mateos (PSOE)

Area
  - Total: 48 km^{2} (19 sq mi)
- Elevation: 940 m (3,080 ft)

Population (2025-01-01)
  - Total: 129
  - Density: 2.7/km^{2} (7.0/sq mi)
- Time zone: UTC+1 (CET)
  - Summer (DST): UTC+2 (CEST)
- Postal code: 37532

Monsagro is a municipality located in the province of Salamanca, Castile and León, Spain. As of 2016 the municipality has a population of 148 inhabitants.
