= Joana Marques Vidal =

First female attorney general of Portugal (1955–2024)

Attorney General of Portugal
- In office 12 October 2012 – 12 October 2018
- Appointed by: Aníbal Cavaco Silva
- Preceded by: Fernando Pinto Monteiro
- Succeeded by: Lucília Gago

Personal details
- Born: Maria Joana Raposo Marques Vidal; 31 December 1955 Coimbra, Portugal
- Died: 9 July 2024 (aged 68) Porto, Portugal
- Cause of death: Cancer
- Education: University of Lisbon
- Occupation: Public prosecutor

Joana Marques Vidal (31 December 1955 – 9 July 2024) was a Portuguese prosecutor who served as the Attorney General of Portugal between 2012 and 2018, being the first woman to hold the post.

== Early life and training ==
Maria Joana Raposo Marques Vidal was born in Santa Cruz in the municipality of Coimbra on 31 December 1955. She was the eldest of six children of José Alberto de Almeida Marques Vidal and Maria Joana Lobo de Portugal Sanches de Morais Ribeiro Raposo. She obtained a degree in law from the University of Lisbon in 1978. She then took a postgraduate course in the protection of minors at the family law centre of the University of Coimbra, followed by a postgraduate course in legal journalism at the Universidade Lusófona in Lisbon.

== Career ==
In 1979, Vidal was appointed deputy public prosecutor for the Autonomous Region of the Azores, based in Ponta Delgada. She subsequently became deputy public prosecutor in Vila Viçosa, Seixal and Cascais. From 1994 to 2002 she was the public prosecutor responsible for the coordination of prosecutors of the Family Court of Lisbon. Between October 2002 and October 2004, she was assistant director of the Centro de Estudos Judiciários, which provides training for future judges. She also lectured on the law relating to the family and minors. Vidal sat on several legislative committees related to family law, contributing to the drawing up of draft legislation on a variety of issues. She was president of the board of the Portuguese Association for Victim Support, and vice-president of the board of the Portuguese Association for Family and Minors Law.

On October 12, 2012, Vidal was appointed the Portuguese Attorney General, the first woman to hold this post. Her term lasted for six years and could have been renewed but the president, Marcelo Rebelo de Sousa, decided not to renew her for a further term on the grounds that he believed that terms of office should be limited.

In November 2018, Vidal joined the public prosecutor's office at the Constitutional Court of Portugal, which, in addition to the review of the constitutionality of legislation, reviews political financing, election expenditure, the declarations of assets and income of politicians and people occupying high public positions, and possible conflicts of interest of political office holders. She left this position in 2021 and became the president of the general council of the University of Minho.

== Death ==
Vidal died at a hospital in Porto, on 9 July 2024, following an operation for cancer. She was 68. While in intensive care she had been visited by Marcelo Rebelo de Sousa.

== Awards and honours ==
In October 2018, Vidal was awarded the Grand Cross of the Military Order of Christ, a leading Portuguese honour.
