= Judicial Studies Center =

Portuguese school for judges and prosecutors

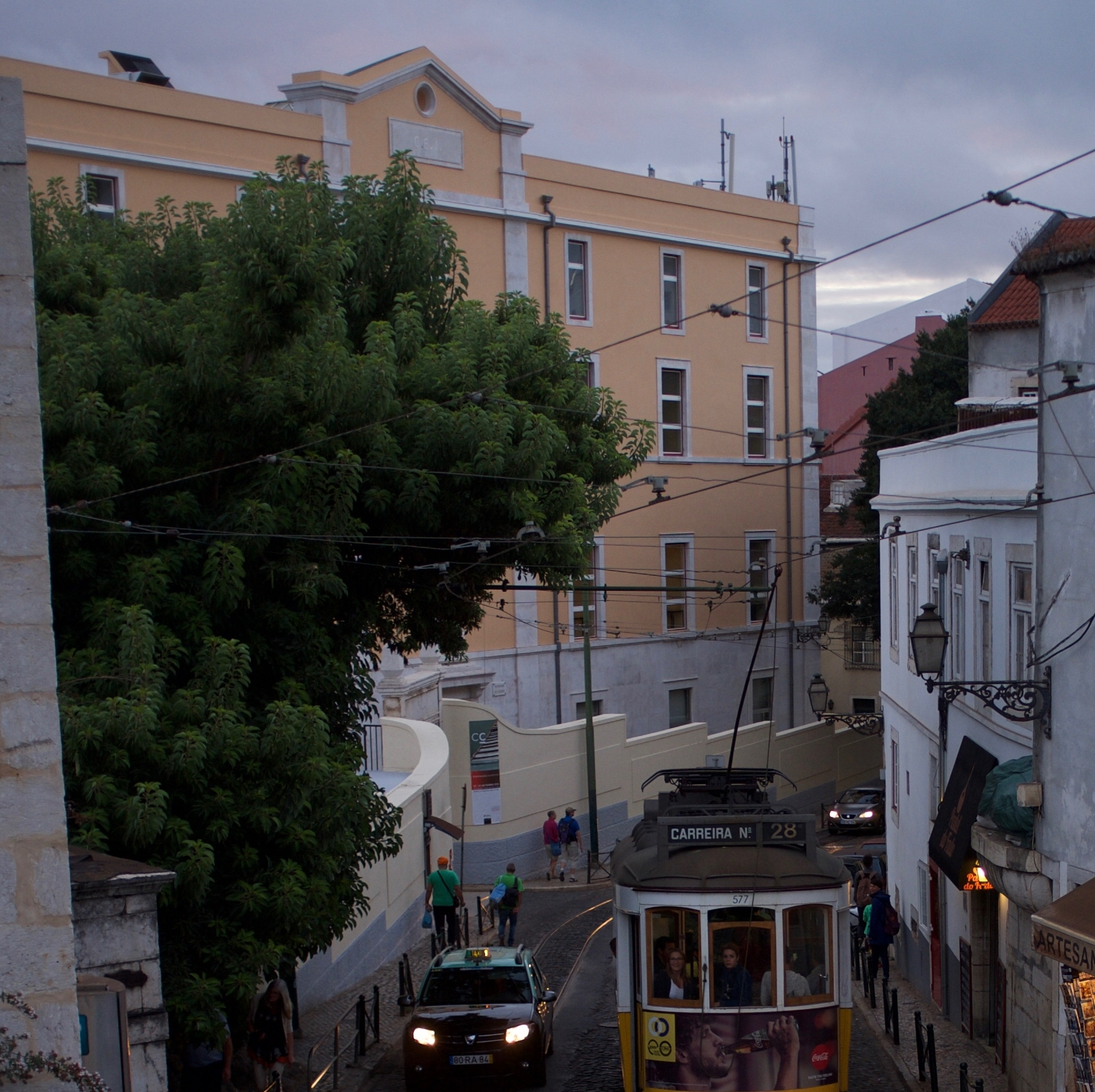
Old Limoeiro jail: seat of the CEJ.

The Judicial Studies Center (Portuguese: Centro de Estudos Judiciários) or CEJ is the Portuguese Government school which provides the occupational training for the future judges and prosecutors who will become part of the Judiciary of Portugal. It also organizes courses for judges, prosecutors and lawyers concerning matters which are deemed useful for their activity.

The CEJ was founded in 1980 and admits graduates in law who are selected after passing written and oral examinations as well as a psychological interview.

Training involves classes at its facilities and practical experiment in courts of law, under the supervision of the CEJ.

The seat of the CEJ is the old Limoeiro jail building in Lisbon. Limoeiro was established as jail in the 17th century and until the 19th century constituted the main facility of the Portuguese penitentiary system. In 1974, after more than 400 years, Limoeiro was finally closed as a jail. Before being used as a jail, Limoeiro served as a Royal residence in the Middle Ages and later as a mint.
