= João Gago Horta =

Portuguese businessman and politician (1943–2022)

Member of the Assembly of the Republic of Portugal
- In office 2002–2005

Personal details
- Born: João José Gago Horta; 11 November 1943 Faro, Portugal
- Died: 2022 (aged 79)
- Party: PSD
- Education: Instituto Superior Técnico
- Occupation: Businessman

João José Gago Horta (11 November 1943 – 2022) was a Portuguese politician. A member of the Social Democratic Party, he served in the Assembly of the Republic, from 2002 to 2005. His death was announced on 2 May 2022.
