= Killing of Odair Moniz =

2024 police shooting of a Cape Verde immigrant in Portugal

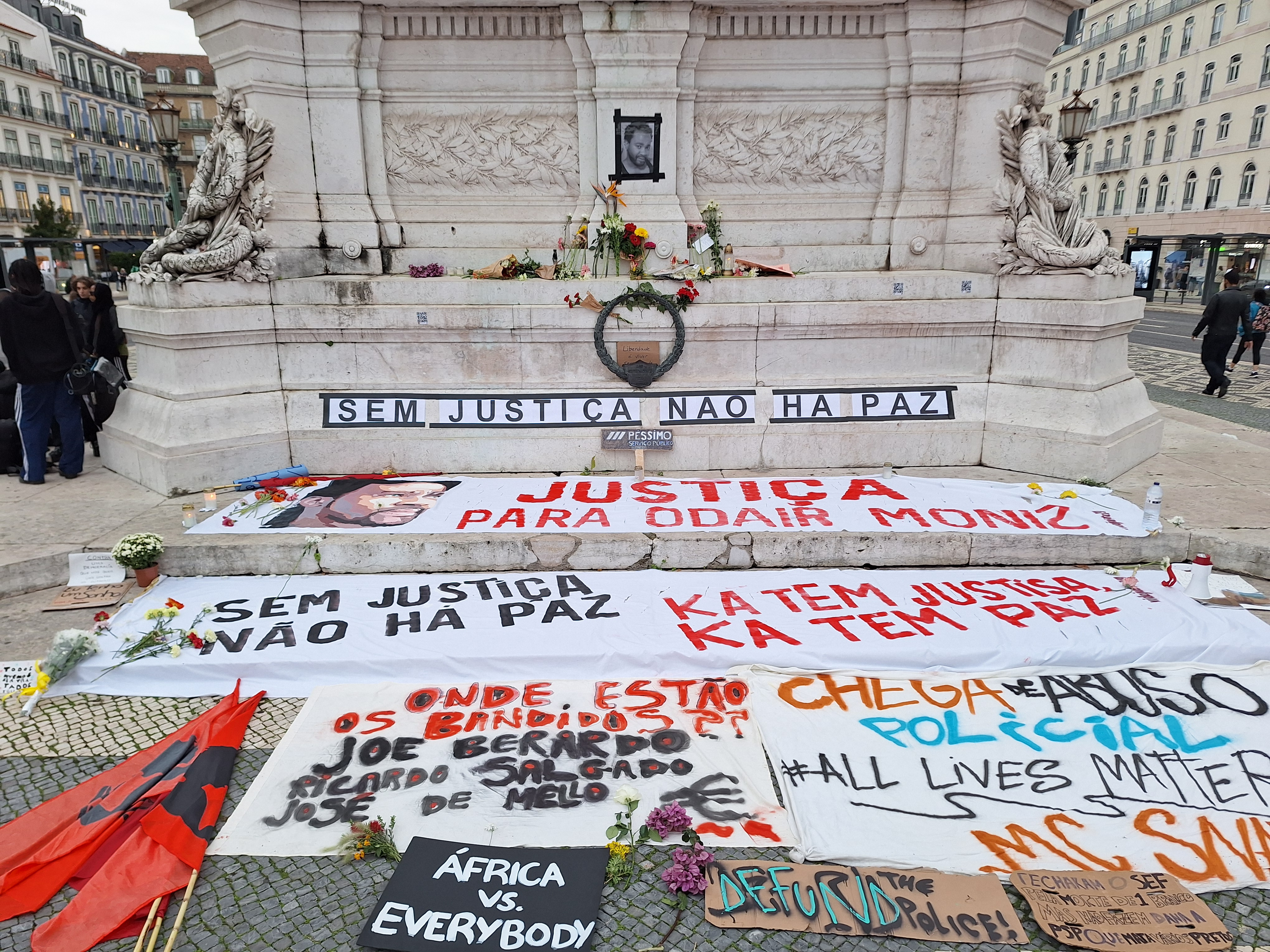
- Memorial to Odair Moniz in Praça do Rossio during a protest on 26 October
- Location: 38°44′43″N 9°12′49″W; Cova da Moura, Amadora, Portugal
- Date: 21 October 2024; 05:43 (WEST)
- Attack type: Shooting
- Weapon: Pistol
- Victim: Odair Moniz
- Perpetrator: Two officers of the Public Security Police

On 21 October 2024, Odair Moreno Moniz, (Note: Portuguese pronunciation: [odaˈiɾ moˈɾenu moˈnis]) a native of Cape Verde and an immigrant in Portugal, died after being shot by a Public Security Police (PSP) officer during a police chase in the Cova da Moura neighbourhood of Amadora. The death of Moniz led to a wave of riots in the Zambujal neighborhood where he lived, which included the looting and arson of two buses. On the night of 22 to 23 October, the riots had spread to six municipalities in the Lisbon metropolitan area, with incidents recorded in sixty police stations in the municipalities of Lisbon, Loures, Amadora, Sintra, Cascais, and Setúbal, which included garbage containers and vehicles being set on fire. Two PSP officers were injured by stone throwing and received hospital treatment.

== Background ==
Odair Moreno Moniz, often referred to as "Dá", was a 43-year-old man born in Cape Verde who had been living in Portugal for over two decades. He was a cook in a restaurant in Lisbon, and was on sick leave after suffering burns at work. He lived in the Zambujal neighborhood in Amadora, where he owned and managed a café described as having a "calm atmosphere" by patrons. He was married and the father of three children aged 19, 18 and 2, and was considered peaceful and well-liked by his neighbors in Zambujal.

Moniz had a record for drug trafficking and violent crimes such as armed robbery, for which he had already served a prison sentence.

== Death ==
At 05:40 (WEST) on 21 October 2024 Moniz left Bairro Alto da Cova da Moura in Amadora in his car after a night of partying. He allegedly fled after seeing a police car on Avenida da República. He began to be chased by two officers of the Public Security Police (PSP), but ended up skidding and destroying his car after crashing into other vehicles. He was then pursued on foot through the streets of the neighborhood. According to the officers, three or four shots were fired, one or two into the air and two in the direction of Moniz, with one of the bullets hitting him in the chest, near the armpit. The shots came from the youngest officer, aged 22 and with less than two years of service in the PSP, who was accompanied by a patrol colleague with two more years of experience. According to the officers, the shooting occurred after Moniz resisted arrest. An initial statement from the PSP alleged that there had been an attempted assault with a sharp weapon by Moniz, who had been brandishing a knife, which was later found by the PSP near the scene of the incident. This information was denied by the officers themselves. A video of the events collected by the Polícia Judiciária (PJ) on the night of the incident shows Moniz standing empty-handed in the air, not brandishing any weapon. The officer who fired the shot, however, stated that Moniz had threatened to pull out the sharp weapon.

Some time after the shooting, Moniz was rushed to São Francisco Xavier Hospital, where at 06:20, he succumbed to his injuries. Moniz had injuries to his head, abdomen, and chest.

The officers did not explain the reason for Odair Moniz's alleged escape, nor why they considered him a suspect. According to RTP, Odair Moniz was initially stopped for having illegally crossed a line while driving.

== Investigation ==
On 21 October, the Ministry of Internal Administration ordered the General Inspectorate of Internal Administration to open an urgent investigation. The PSP also announced the opening of an internal investigation to determine the circumstances of the incident.

A preliminary assessment pointed to excessive self-defense by the police officer who shot Moniz, with disproportionate and unjustified use of force that resorted to lethal means despite confirming that Moniz was holding a knife at the time. After being questioned, the officer who fired the shot was accused of homicide, and was not suspended or transferred despite and having his gun license revoked. The weapon was seized for analysis at a Polícia Científica laboratory. After the initial investigation, the Public Prosecutor's Office at the Amadora Central Department of Investigation and Criminal Prosecution (DIAP), began the process of deciding whether to close the case or to formally charge the officer with murder.

== Response ==
The SOS Racismo association and the Vida Justa movement contested the PSP's version of events, demanding a serious and impartial investigation in order to determine all responsibilities of the parties involved. Each believed that the results of the investigation represented a culture of impunity within the Portuguese police organization. According to SOS Racismo, Odair Moniz's death occurred in a political context of exacerbated hate speech and stigmatizing security measures aimed at black communities.

Cape Verde's ambassador to Portugal, Eurico Monteiro, lamented the death of a Cape Verdean citizen by a PSP officer, and expressed hope that the ongoing investigation would be thorough and that all parties responsible would be determined.

André Ventura, leader of far-right party Chega, accused the Portuguese government of weakness in dealing with the situation, defending the police officer responsible for the shooting and labeling the perpetrators of the riots as "rascaria", roughly translating to "scumbags".

== Riots and demonstrations ==
Odair Moniz riots
- Date: 21–26 October 2024
- Location: Lisbon metropolitan area
- Caused by: Killing of Odair Moniz by a PSP officer
- Methods: Rioting; Vandalism; Arson

Parties
| Rioters | Public Security Police |

Casualties
- Injuries: 7
- Arrested: 21

=== 21 October ===
The news of Odair Moniz's death sparked a feeling of outrage in the Zambujal neighborhood, where he lived, with several residents characterizing what had happened as “two shots at an unarmed worker”. For several residents of the neighborhood, Odair Moniz was an exemplary citizen and the explanation given by the Public Security Police left many doubts among them.

The riots began on the evening of 21 October, and the PSP increased policing in the Zambujal neighborhood, with the Intervention Corps and Rapid Intervention Teams being sent to the scene. Several trash bins were set on fire, and security forces were struck by stones thrown by rioters in addition to a Carris bus that was travelling in the neighborhood. A group of around forty people with covered faces spread fuel in various areas of the neighborhood, blocking the roads, and forcing the PSP to fire shots to disperse the crowd.

=== 22 October ===
During the afternoon of 22 October, about a hundred residents of the Zambujal neighborhood gathered on Rua das Galegas demanding justice for the death of Odair Moniz. Despite the tension, the demonstration remained relatively peaceful until nightfall, although CNN Portugal reporters confirmed the existence of gunshots and firecrackers at the scene.

Early in the evening, a Carris Metropolitana bus was stolen, after the driver and passengers were forced out, and taken to the interior of the Zambujal neighborhood, where around twenty people set it on fire with Molotov cocktails, completely burning it. Two people were treated at the scene for smoke inhalation. Objects were thrown into the neighborhood streets, and the police prevented residents from entering the neighborhood. The PSP Intervention Corps was called to the Zambujal neighborhood. An arrest was confirmed of a man in possession of flammable material, which indicated its use to start a fire.

According to Odair Moniz's family, at 20:00 that day, three PSP officers broke down the door of his house and attacked some of the people who were there. The PSP claims to be unaware of this situation, denying having entered the homes of residents in the neighborhood. A video released by a Record TV Europa reporting team shows PSP officers at the entrance to the building where Odair Moniz lived, in what, according to residents, was the second visit by the PSP to the location after breaking down the door.

During the night, riots spread to other areas of Amadora and to Carnaxide in Oeiras, where a vehicle was set on fire. In Damaia, riots broke out in several streets, with firecrackers and stones being thrown onto the public road, as well as several trash bins being set on fire. In Cova da Moura, several rioters tried to set fire to a Repsol petrol station, and shots were fired.

In the Portela de Carnaxide neighborhood in Oeiras, a Carris bus was stolen and set on fire, with the fire reaching a house as well as a vehicle which the bus had crashed into after travelling several meters while out of control. There were several other fires in the same neighborhood, in particular tires burning at a roundabout which preventing cars from moving through it, and several gunshots were heard. Following the disturbances, several residents began to leave the neighborhood in their vehicles. The police used rubber bullets and managed to enter the neighborhood.

There were also reports of disturbances in Sintra, where an object was thrown at the PSP police station in Casal de Cambra, without causing any damage. In Lisbon, rubbish bins were set on fire in Carnide and Campo de Ourique, with the disturbances spreading to Loures and Odivelas.

The PSP established additional police presence in what it called "Sensitive Urban Zones".

=== 23 October ===
On the night of 22 to 23 October, the disturbances had spread to six municipalities in the Lisbon Metropolitan Area, with incidents recorded at or around sixty police stations in the municipalities of Lisbon, Loures, Amadora, Sintra, Cascais, and Setúbal, with rubbish bins and vehicles being set on fire. Two PSP officers were injured by stone throwing and required hospital treatment.

=== 24 October ===
In the early hours of 24 October, another Carris Metropolitana bus was set on fire with a Molotov cocktail in the Cidade Nova neighborhood of Santo António dos Cavaleiros in the municipality of Loures with the busdriver still inside, resulting in severe burns. The worker was hospitalized in a serious condition in the burns unit of the Hospital de Santa Maria. At the same day, a third Carris Metropolitana bus was set on fire in Seixal, and eight more vehicles were set on fire in other municipalities in Greater Lisbon. A PSP vehicle was vandalized. 45 incidents of fires involving street furniture were recorded in the Lisbon Metropolitan Area, particularly in the municipalities of Almada, Amadora, Barreiro, Lisbon, Loures, Oeiras, Seixal and Sintra. The PSP arrested 13 suspects in relation to the riots and had identified the involvement of 18 others.

=== 26 October ===
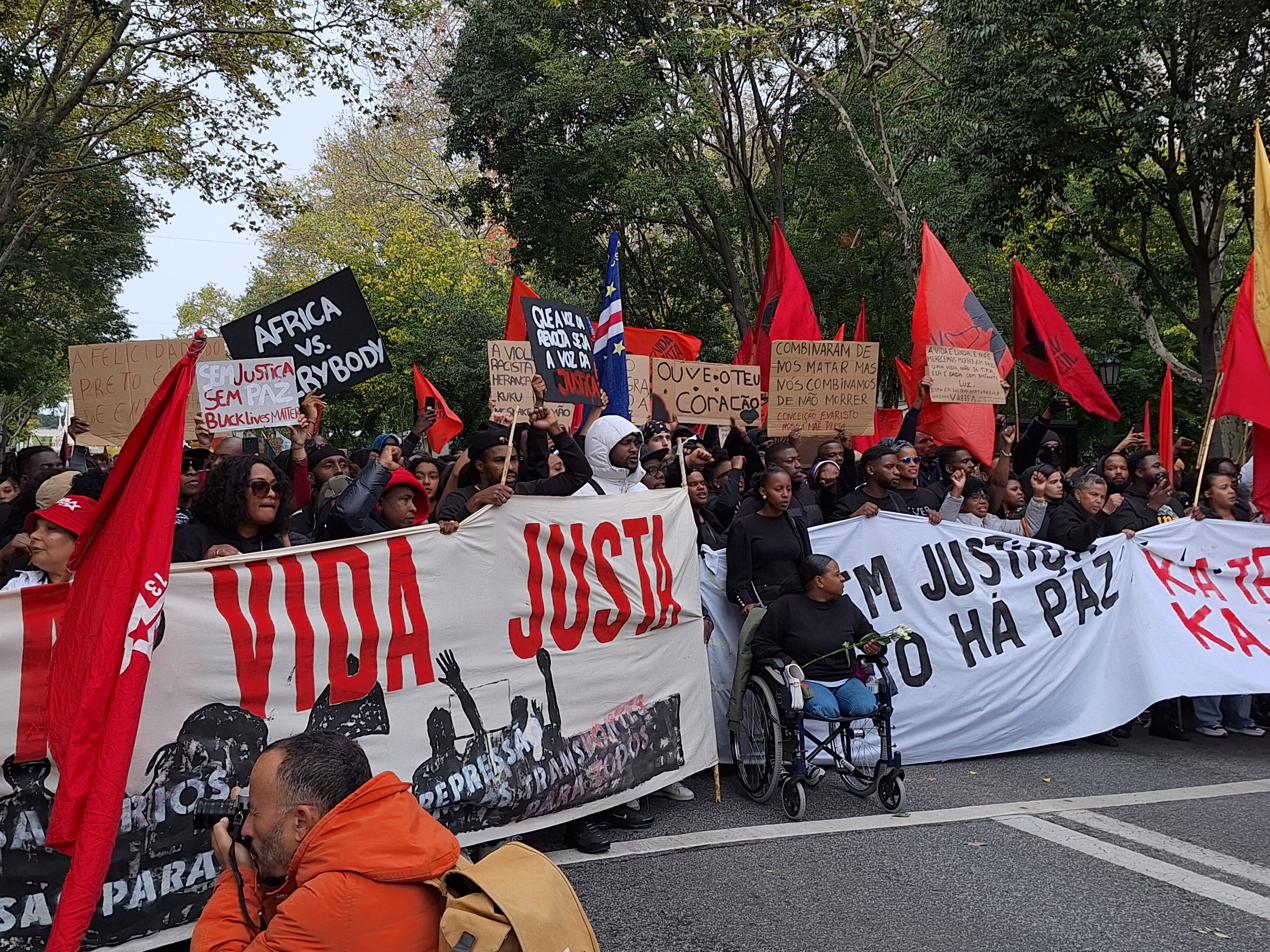
March against police brutality organized by Vida Justa

On 26 October, a march demanding justice for the killing and against racism and police brutality was held on Avenida da Liberdade in downtown Lisbon by the Vida Justa rights group, with attendance in the thousands. Chega held a smaller pro-police demonstration of about 300 atendees towards the São Bento Palace, seat of the Portuguese Assembly, which forced Vida Justa to modify the march's route to avoid conflict.

== Trial ==
The trial of the police officer who shot Odair Moniz started on 22 October 2025, at Sintra's Palace of Justice, with the police officer in question, officer Bruno Pinto, apologizing to the family of the victim. Final allegations were made on 18 May 2026. One month later, on 15 June 2026, the Court sentenced the police officer to three and a half years of suspended imprisonment, declared that the officer acted in legitimate self-defense, but with excessive means, ruling that there was no evidence that Moniz was carrying a knife, and allowed his reinstatement to the police force. The court also ordered the defendant to pay monetary compensation to the victim's family.
