= Palácio da Justiça (Porto) =

Government building in Porto, Portugal

Coordinates: 41°08′43″N 8°37′04″W

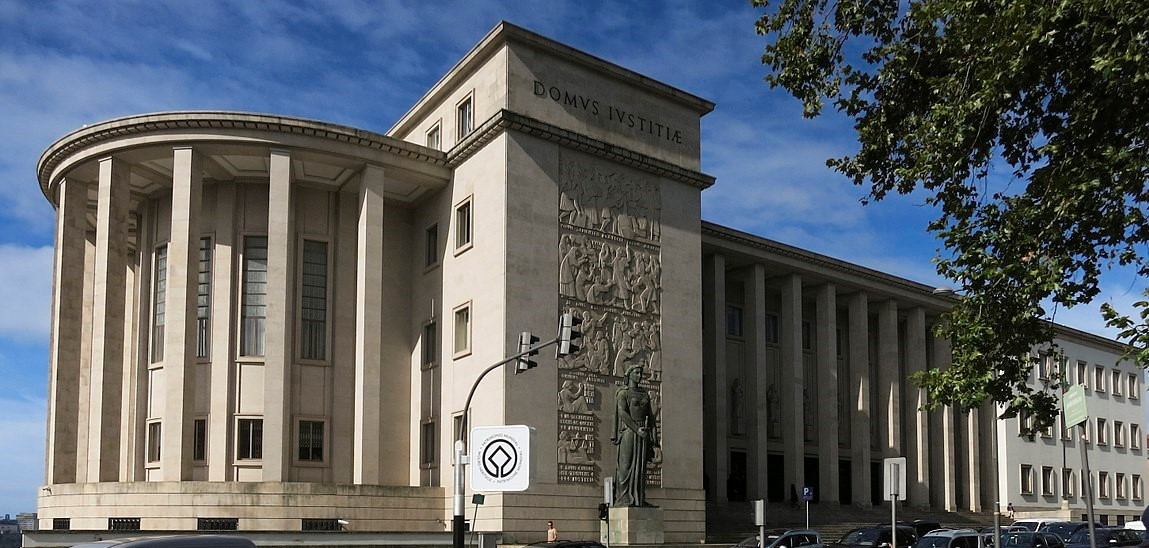
Palace of Justice's main facade

Palácio da Justiça is a palace government building in Porto, Portugal. It was built in 1958.
