= Emergency medical services in Portugal =

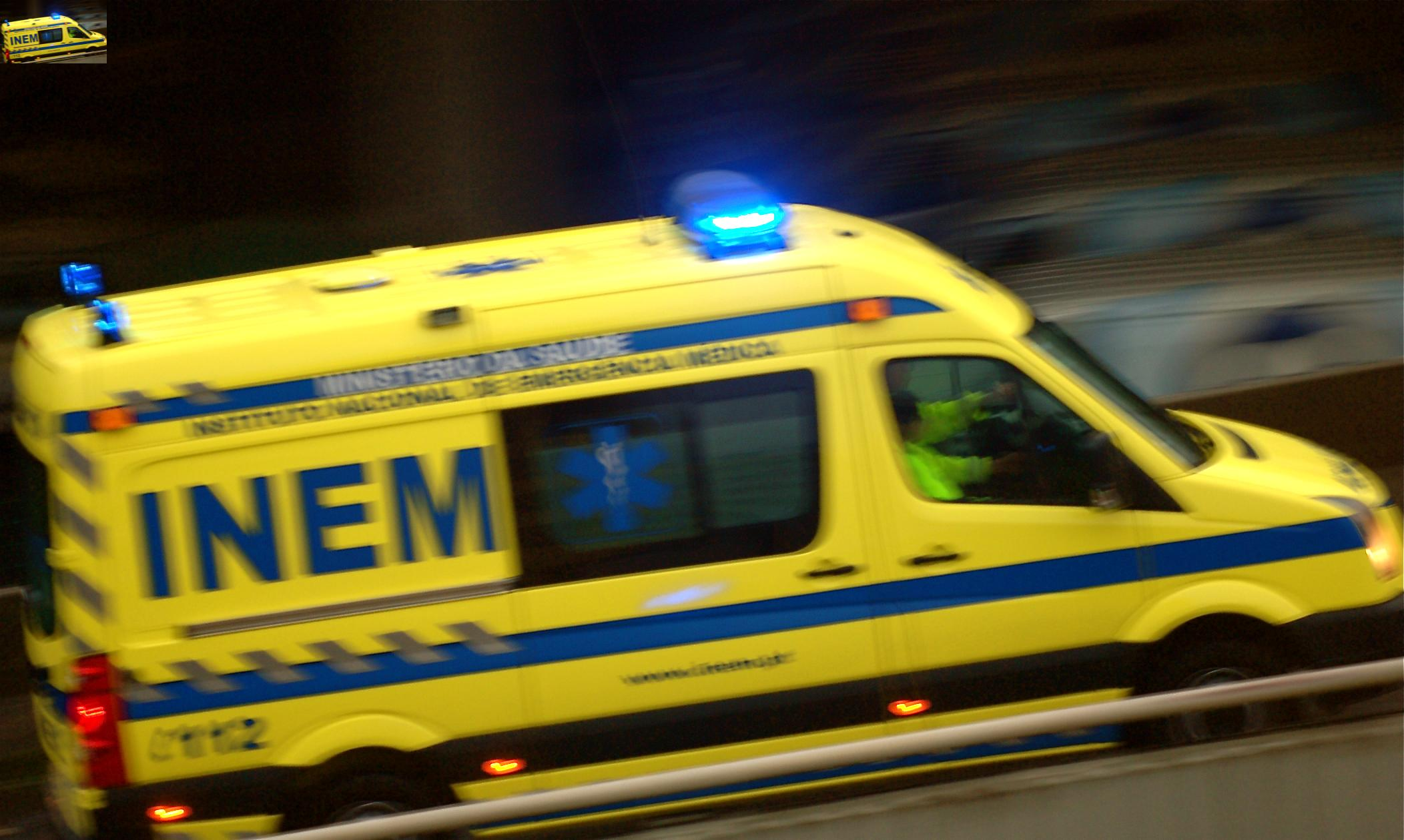
INEM's ambulance speeding in response to a medical emergency in Lisbon

Emergency medical services in Portugal are organized in three separate systems, one each covering Continental Portugal, the Azores and Madeira. The largest system is SIEM, which covers the territory of Continental Portugal.

The modern Portuguese emergency medical services were created in 1964, and were initially provided only in the major cities of Lisbon, and later Porto, Coimbra, Aveiro, Setúbal and Faro, by PSP Police ambulances and staff. These services were accessible through a telephone call to the national emergency number 115. In 1971, the National Ambulance Service (SNA) was created. It was later absorbed into the National Institute of Medical Emergencies (INEM) when it was created 10 years later. The Integrated Medical Emergency System (SIEM) was created as a part of INEM in 1980. In the 1990s the national emergency number 115 was replaced by the European common emergency number 112.

== Services in Continental Portugal ==
In Continental Portugal, there are three major emergency medical services providers: the National Institute of Medical Emergencies (INEM (pronounced [iˈnɛm]), the fire departments, and the Portuguese Red Cross.

INEM is the agency of the Portuguese Ministry of Health responsible for coordinating the Integrated Medical Emergency System (SIEM) of Continental Portugal, and directly providing some of its emergency medical services. Of the services provided by INEM, some are operated by their own staff (e.g. guidance centers and ambulances in major cities), while the operation of others is delegated to the staff of local fire departments, and of the Portuguese Red Cross, but using INEM's equipment (e.g. ambulances in small towns).

Fire departments are traditionally the major providers of local emergency medical services outside of major cities in their respective areas of responsibility, which usually coincide with the territory of a municipality. Virtually all of the more than 400 fire departments include an emergency medical services unit. The services are provided through the use of the departments' own equipment and/or, with equipment delegated by INEM. In major cities, the emergency medical service units of fire departments serve as backups or reinforcements to INEM.

The Portuguese Red Cross – through its Corps of Rescue Units (CORUS) – is another major provider of medical emergency services. It usually acts as a backup or reinforcement to both INEM and the fire departments.

=== Integrated Medical Emergency System (SIEM) ===
The Integrated Medical Emergency System (Portuguese: Sistema Integrado de Emergência Médica) or SIEM, is centrally managed by the National Institute of Medical Emergencies (INEM). It covers Continental Portugal and operates like other organised Emergency medical services around the world.

In Portugal, the free of charge phone number for emergency medical service is the Europe wide 112 (emergency telephone number). When someone dials "1-1-2", the call is directed to a PSP Police dispatch center. The PSP dispatch center redirects the call accordingly for the type of emergency to the appropriate emergency services. In continental Portugal medical emergency calls are directed to one of INEM's urgent patient guidance centers (Portuguese: centro de orientação de doentes urgentes) or CODU's. There are four regional CODU's; Lisbon, Porto, Coimbra and Faro. Additionally, there is the CODU-Mar that responds to maritime medical emergencies.

Under the coordination of CODU's, a number of specialized mobile resources operate, including ambulances, fly cars, air ambulances and motorcycle ambulances. The ambulances are either directly operated by INEM from its regional delegations, or are operated from the medical emergency and reserve posts installed in the local fire departments, or local delegations of the Portuguese Red Cross.

Besides CODU's, SIEM also operates INEM's Anti-Poison Information Center (CIAV), which provides 24/7 toxicological medical information at a national level (including in the Azores and Madeira), as well as the Pediatric Inter-Hospital Transport (TIP) subsystem, which provides emergency transportation of high risk newborns to specialized hospital units.

=== Mobile Resources ===
SIEM includes standard medical emergency mobile resources, some of them directly operated by INEM, while others are operated by fire departments, the Portuguese Red Cross, or other entities. The following resources exist:

- Ambulância de emergência médica (AEM) – basic life support ambulance, crewed by two emergency medical technicians. All AEM ambulances are owned by INEM, but the operation of some is delegated to other entities such as local fire departments. AEM's are complemented by fire department owned fire rescue ambulances (ABSC).
- Ambulância de suporte imediato de vida (SIV) – immediate life support ambulance, similar to an AEM, but with an emergency medical nurse in its crew instead of a second emergency medical technician.
- Viatura médica de emergência e reanimação (VMER) – resuscitation and emergency medical vehicle (fly car), crewed by an emergency medical physician and a nurse.
- Ambulância de suporte avançado de vida pediátrico – pediatric advanced life support ambulance, crewed by a physician, nurse, and an emergency medical technician.
- Helicóptero de emergência médica – medical emergency helicopter (air ambulance), crewed by two pilots, a physician and a nurse.
- Motociclo de emergência médica – medical emergency motorcycle (motorcycle ambulance), crewed by a single medical emergency technician.
- Veículo de intervenção em catástrofe – disaster intervention vehicle, carrying advanced life support equipment, and able to set up a small field hospital and mobile communications center.
Portuguese EMS mobile resources

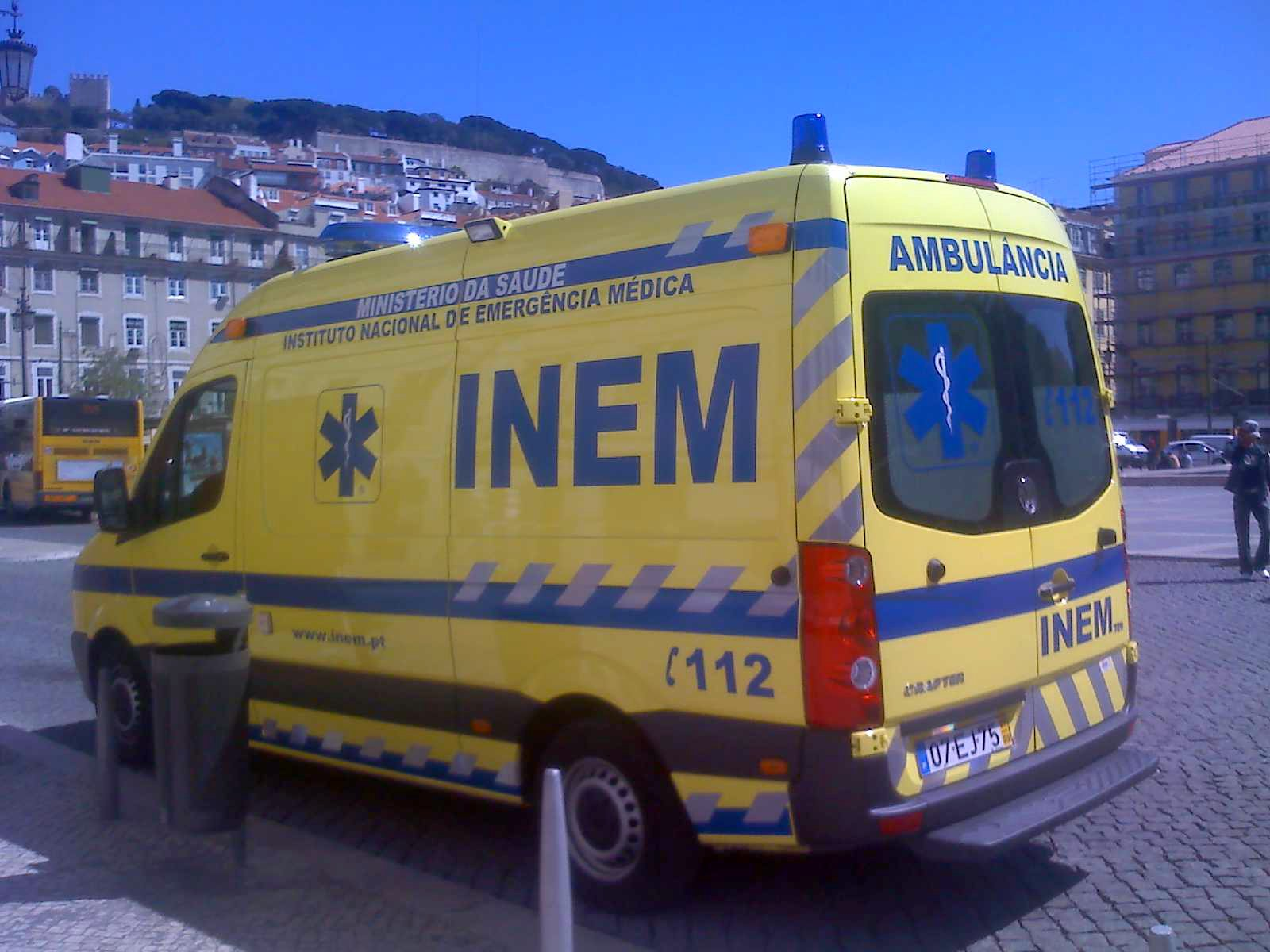
INEM AEM ambulance

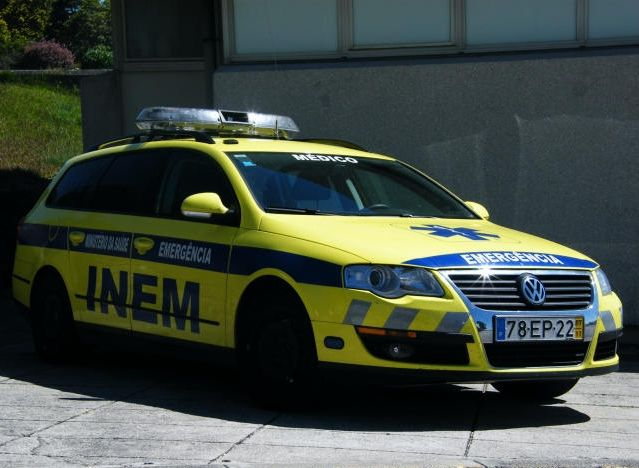
INEM VMER

== Services in the Portuguese Atlantic Islands ==
As part of their unique administrative powers, the Portuguese autonomous regions of The Azores and Madeira have their own separate emergency medical services, each controlled by their respective regional secretaries of Health. These services are smaller than those on continental Portugal, but share many common features with SIEM.

=== Madeira ===
In Madeira, emergency medical services are coordinated by the Regional Medical Emergency Service (SEMER), which mirrors the role and function of INEM on continental Portugal specifically for the region. SEMER includes the Rapid Intervention Medical Team (EMIR), which is prepared to provide medical rescue in any part of the region, including rescue in maritime and air environments if needed.

=== The Azores ===
In the Azores, emergency medical services are centrally managed by the Regional Civil Protection and Fire Service.

=== Air ambulance ===
Unlike continental Portugal, where air ambulance services are typically provided directly by INEM with its own helicopters, in the Atlantic islands, the Portuguese Air Force is in charge of emergency patient evacuations between islands, and from ships. Rotary and/or fixed wing aircraft (usually EADS CASA C-295 aircraft operated by the 502 Squadron, and EH-101 helicopters operated by the 751 Squadron), are used in combination if needed.

== See also ==
- Health in Portugal
