= Sham election =

Election held purely for show, with no real choice or impact

A sham election, or show election, is an election that is held purely for show; that is, without any significant political choice or real impact on the results of the election.

== Description ==
Sham elections are a common event in dictatorships that feel the need to feign the appearance of public legitimacy. Published results usually show high voter turnout and high support (typically at least 80%, and close to 100% in many cases) for the prescribed candidates or for the referendum choice that favours the political party in power. Dictatorial regimes can also organize sham elections with results simulating those that might be achieved in democratic countries.

Sometimes, only one government-approved candidate is allowed to run in sham elections with no opposition candidates allowed, or opposition candidates are arrested on false charges (or even without any charges) before the election to prevent them from running. Ballots may contain only one "yes" option, or in the case of a simple "yes or no" question, security forces often persecute people who pick "no", thus encouraging them to pick the "yes" option. In other cases, those who vote receive stamps in their passport for doing so, while those who did not vote (and thus do not receive stamps) are persecuted as enemies of the people.

Sham elections can sometimes backfire against the party in power, especially if the regime believes they are popular enough to win without coercion, fraud or suppressing the opposition. The most famous example of this was the 1990 Myanmar general election, in which the government-sponsored National Unity Party suffered a landslide defeat by the opposition National League for Democracy and consequently, the results were annulled.

== History ==
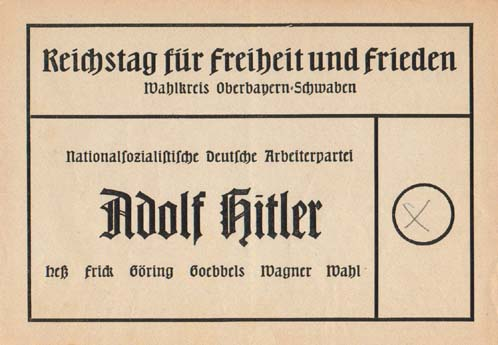
A ballot from the 1936 elections in Nazi Germany

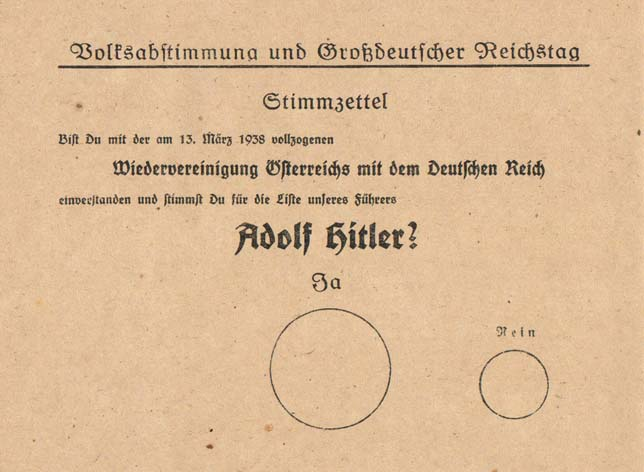
A ballot from the 1938 elections in Nazi Germany asking voters to approve the new Reichstag and the Anschluss. The "no" box was made significantly smaller than the "yes" box.

Examples of sham elections include:

- The 1928, 1935, 1942, 1949, 1951 and 1958 elections in Portugal
- The 1929 and 1934 elections in Fascist Italy
- Those in Nazi Germany
- The 1940 elections of Stalinist "People's Parliaments" to legitimise the Soviet occupation of Estonia, Latvia and Lithuania
- The 1942 general election in Imperial Japan
- Those in North Korea
- Those in Apartheid South Africa, between 1948 to 1994
- Those in East Germany, other than the elections in 1949 and 1990
- Those in the Soviet Union, other than the elections in 1989, 1990, and 1991.
- Those in Cuba since the 1952 Cuban coup d'état and especially since the Cuban Revolution of 1959
- Those in Pahlavi Iran since the aftermath of the 1953 Iranian coup d'etat, notably in 1975
- Those in Egypt under Gamal Abdel Nasser, Anwar Sadat, Hosni Mubarak, and Abdel Fattah el-Sisi
- Those in Tunisia under Habib Bourguiba and his successor Zine El Abidine Ben Ali
- Those in Cameroon since independence since 1960
- Those in Chad since independence since 1960
- Those in the Central African Republic since independence since 1960
- Those in Upper Volta
- Those in Burkina Faso
- Those in Rwanda since 1965
- Those in Indonesia during New Order regime
- Those in Equatorial Guinea since independence in 1968
- Those in Zaire
- Those in Ba'athist Syria under Hafez al-Assad and his son Bashar al-Assad
- Those in Djibouti since independence since 1977
- Those in Yemen under Ali Abdullah Saleh
- Those in the Republic of the Congo under Denis Sassou Nguesso
- Those in Eswatini under Mswati III
- Those in Sudan under Omar al-Bashir
- Those in Ivory Coast since 1990
- The 1991 and 2019 Kazakh presidential elections
- Those in Turkmenistan
- Those in Tajikistan under Emomali Rahmon
- Those in Azerbaijan under Heydar Aliyev and his son Ilham Aliyev
- Those in Belarus after 1994 (most notably in 2020)
- The 1995 and 2002 presidential referendums in Saddam Hussein's Iraq
- Those in Uganda since 1996 (most notably in 2026)
- Those in Venezuela since 1999.
- Those in Russia under Vladimir Putin
- Those in the Democratic Republic of the Congo since 2006
- Those in Bangladesh under Sheikh Hasina
- The 2009 and 2021 presidential elections in the Islamic Republic of Iran.
- The 2011 presidential election in the Gambia under Yahya Jammeh, after ECOWAS declined to send observers, citing voter intimidation and government control of the media.
- The 2011, 2016, and the 2021 elections in Nicaragua.
- Those in Burundi since 2015.
- The 2018 and 2023 general elections in Cambodia under Hun Sen, after the dissolution of the Cambodia National Rescue Party and the exclusion of the Candlelight Party.
- The 2019 Thai general election in Thailand.
- Those in Hong Kong since the electoral system changes in 2021
- The 2023 Zimbabwean general election was condemned by critics as a sham election and criticised by observer missions, including the organization SADC.
- The 2025 Tanzanian general election was decried by many as a sham election.

In Mexico, all of the presidential elections from 1929 to 1982 are considered to be sham elections, as the Institutional Revolutionary Party (PRI) and its predecessors governed the country in a de facto single-party system without serious opposition, and they won all of the presidential elections in that period with more than 70% of the vote. The first seriously competitive presidential election in modern Mexican history was that of 1988, in which for the first time the PRI candidate faced two strong opposition candidates, though it is believed that the government rigged the result. The first fair election was held in 1994, though the opposition did not win until 2000. The PRI would not win again until 2012.

A predetermined conclusion is permanently established by the regime through suppression of the opposition, coercion of voters, vote rigging, reporting several votes received greater than the number of voters, outright lying, or some combination of these. In an extreme example, Charles D. B. King of Liberia was reported to have won by 234,000 votes in the 1927 general election, a "majority" that was over fifteen times larger than the number of eligible voters.

== See also ==
- Wasted vote
