= 1942 in Portugal =

- Decades: 1920s; 1930s; 1940s; 1950s; 1960s
- See also: History of Portugal; Timeline of Portuguese history; List of years in Portugal

Events in the year 1942 in Portugal.

== Incumbents ==
- President: Óscar Carmona
- Prime Minister: António de Oliveira Salazar (National Union)

== Events ==
- 8 February – Presidential election.
- 1 November – Portuguese legislative election, 1942.

== Births ==
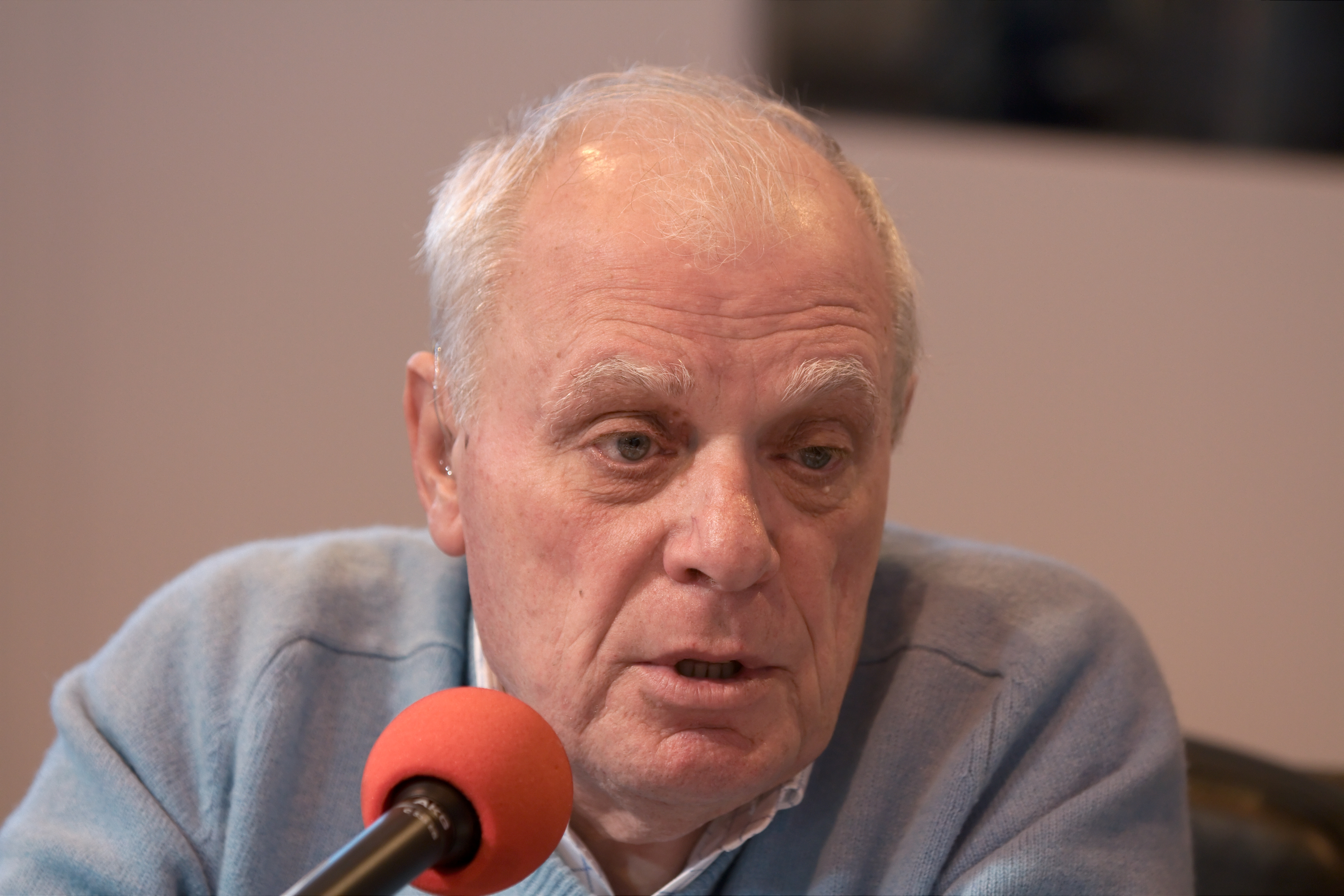
António Lobo Antunes

- 30 January – Jaime Graça, footballer
- 1 September – António Lobo Antunes, novelist and physician
- 29 December – Manuel Rodrigues, footballer
