= 1949 in Portugal =

- Decades: 1920s; 1930s; 1940s; 1950s; 1960s
- See also: History of Portugal; Timeline of Portuguese history; List of years in Portugal

Events in the year 1949 in Portugal.

== Incumbents ==
- President: Óscar Carmona
- Prime Minister: António de Oliveira Salazar (National Union)

== Events ==
- 13 February - Presidential election.
- 28 October – 1949 Air France Lockheed Constellation crash
- 13 November – Portuguese legislative election, 1949.

== Sports ==
- G.D. Chaves founded

== Births ==
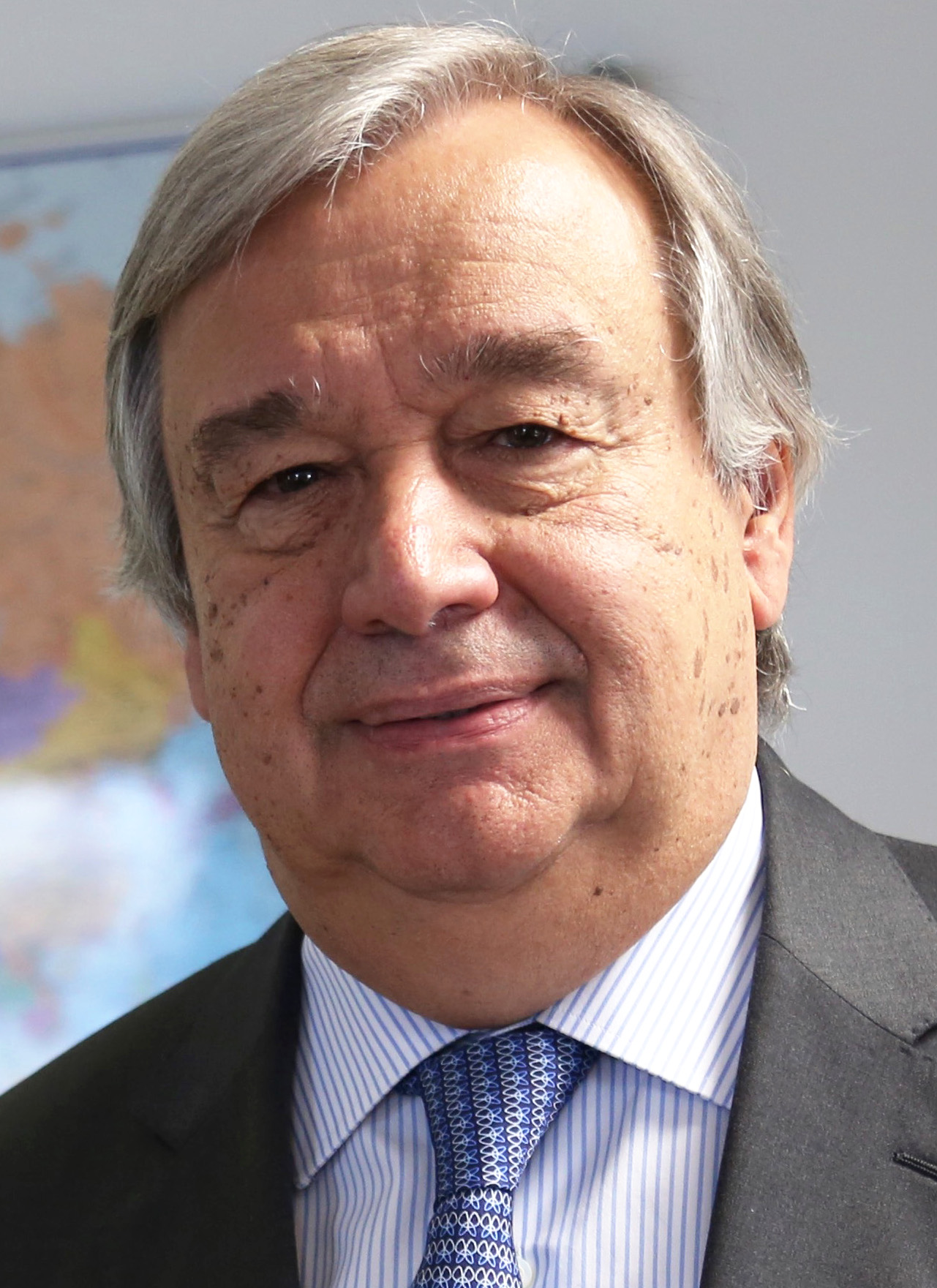
António Guterres

- 30 April – António Guterres, politician

== Deaths ==
- 7 January – José Ramos Preto, politician (born 1871)
- 4 August – Liberato Pinto, politician (born 1880)
