= 1943 in Portugal =

- Decades: 1920s; 1930s; 1940s; 1950s; 1960s
- See also: History of Portugal; Timeline of Portuguese history; List of years in Portugal

Events in the year 1943 in Portugal.

== Incumbents ==
- President: Óscar Carmona
- Prime Minister: António de Oliveira Salazar (National Union)

== Events ==
- August – Luso-British agreement is signed, leasing air basis in the Azores to the UK.

== Arts and entertainment ==
- 28 November – First issue of the weekly newspaper O Benfica

== Sports ==
- GD Bragança founded
- Santa Maria FC founded

== Births ==
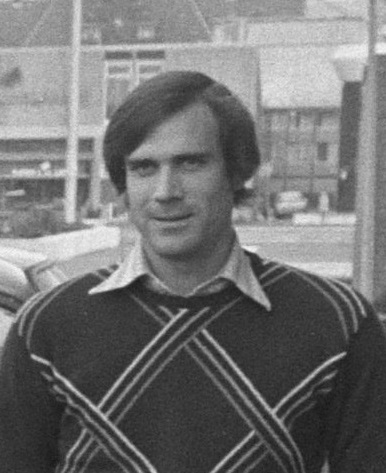
Malta da Silva

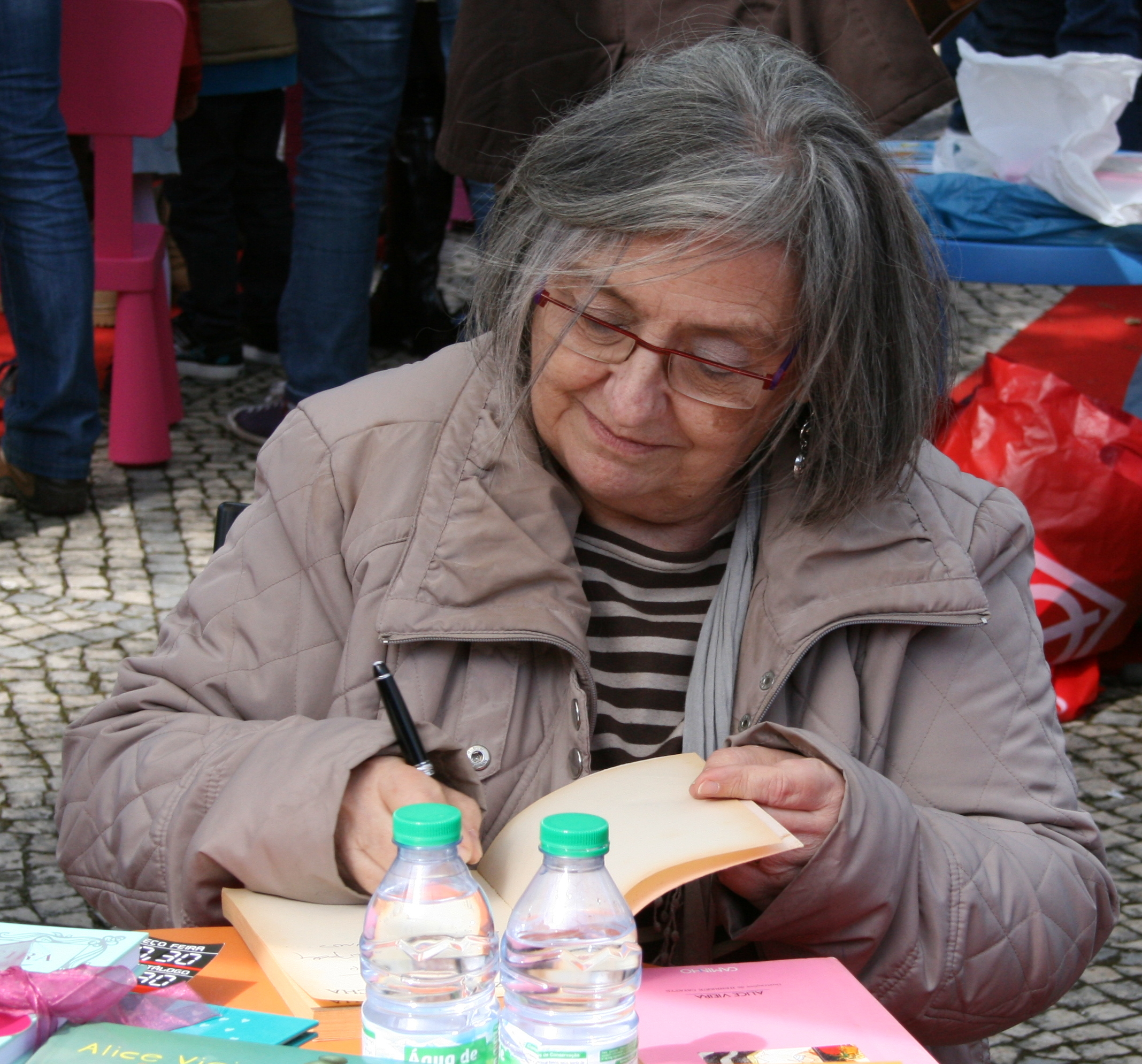
Alice Vieira

- 5 February – Manuel Luís dos Santos, footballer
- 19 February – Amandio Malta da Silva, footballer
- 22 February – Antônio Lino da Silva Dinis, Bishop of Itumbiara (died 2013).
- 20 March – Alice Vieira, children's writer.
- 25 June – Serafim Pereira, footballer (died 1994)
- 3 September – Marinho, footballer
- 2 October – Eduardo Serra, cinematographer
- 28 October – João Aguiar, journalist and novelist (died 2010)
- 18 November – Manuel António Pina, journalist and poet (died 2012)

== Deaths ==
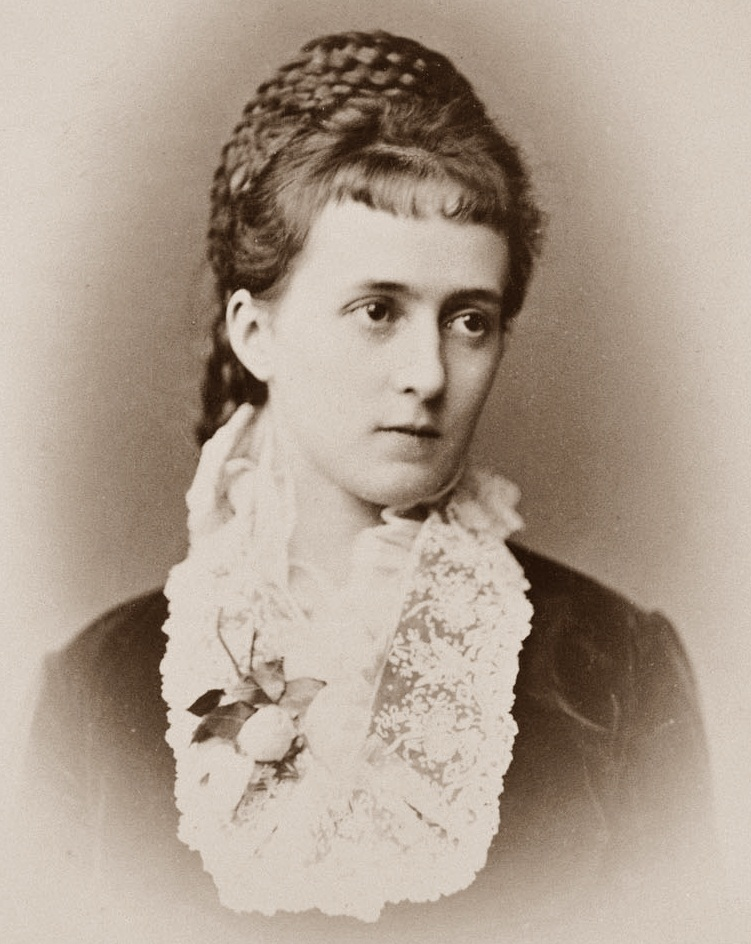
Infanta Maria Josepha of Portugal

- 10 January – Manuel Maria Coelho, military officer and politician (born 1857)
- 11 March – Infanta Maria Josepha of Portugal (born 1857)
- May – Dom Aleixo, war hero of East Timor (born 1886)
