= 1945 in Portugal =

- Decades: 1920s; 1930s; 1940s; 1950s; 1960s
- See also: History of Portugal; Timeline of Portuguese history; List of years in Portugal

Events in the year 1945 in Portugal.

== Incumbents ==
- President: Óscar Carmona
- Prime Minister: António de Oliveira Salazar (National Union)

== Events ==
- 14 March - Establishment of TAP Portugal
- October - Establishment of the Movement of Democratic Unity
- 18 November - Legislative election
- Disestablishment of the Movement of National Antifascist Unity
- Establishment of Caritas Portugal

== Arts and entertainment ==
- 29 January - Establishment of A Bola

=== Films ===
- Três Dias Sem Deus

== Sport ==
- 1 July - 1945 Taça de Portugal Final
- Establishment of C.A. Valdevez
- Establishment of FC Amares
