= 1948 in Portugal =

- Decades: 1920s; 1930s; 1940s; 1950s; 1960s
- See also: History of Portugal; Timeline of Portuguese history; List of years in Portugal

Events in the year 1948 in Portugal.

== Incumbents ==
- President: Óscar Carmona
- Prime Minister: António de Oliveira Salazar (National Union)

== Arts and entertainment ==
- March – The Hot Club of Portugal is established

== Sports ==
- CD Operário founded
- A.D. Lousada founded
- C.D. Montijo founded
- C.D. Pinhalnovense founded
- C.D. Portosantense founded

== Births ==
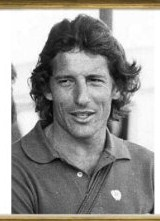
Moisés Matias de Andrade

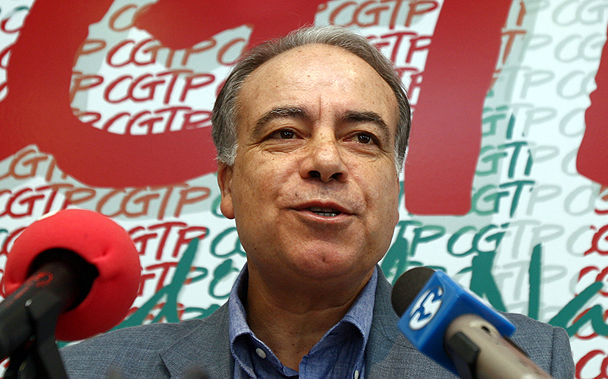
Manuel Carvalho da Silva

- 10 January – Moisés Matias de Andrade, footballer (d. 2008)
- 17 January – Alfredo Murça, footballer (d. 2007)
- 29 March – Fernando Tordo, singer and composer
- 25 June – Manuel Bento, footballer (d. 2007)
- 25 July – Carlos Silva Valente, footballer
- 4 August – Braulio Barbosa de Lima, footballer
- 11 August – António Taí, footballer
- 21 October – Francisco Mário, footballer
- 30 October – Ilda Figueiredo, politician
- 2 November – Manuel Carvalho da Silva, sociologist
- 6 November – Quinito, footballer
- 23 November – Leonor Beleza, politician

=== Full date missing ===
- Julião Sarmento, painter and multimedia artist

== Deaths ==
- 15 December – João Tamagnini Barbosa, military officer and politician (born 1883)
