= 1950 in Portugal =

- Decades: 1930s; 1940s; 1950s; 1960s; 1970s
- See also: History of Portugal; Timeline of Portuguese history; List of years in Portugal

Events in the year 1950 in Portugal.

== Incumbents ==
- President: Óscar Carmona
- Prime Minister: António de Oliveira Salazar (National Union)

== Events ==
- The Pracana Dam completed.

== Sports ==
- Aliados Lordelo F.C. founded
- A.D. Carregado founded
- F.C. Paços de Ferreira founded
- G.D. Igreja Nova founded

== Births ==
- Paulo Branco, film producer.
- Pedro Caldeira Cabral, musician
- Fernando Nogueira, politician
- Gerardo Ribeiro, violinist

== Deaths ==
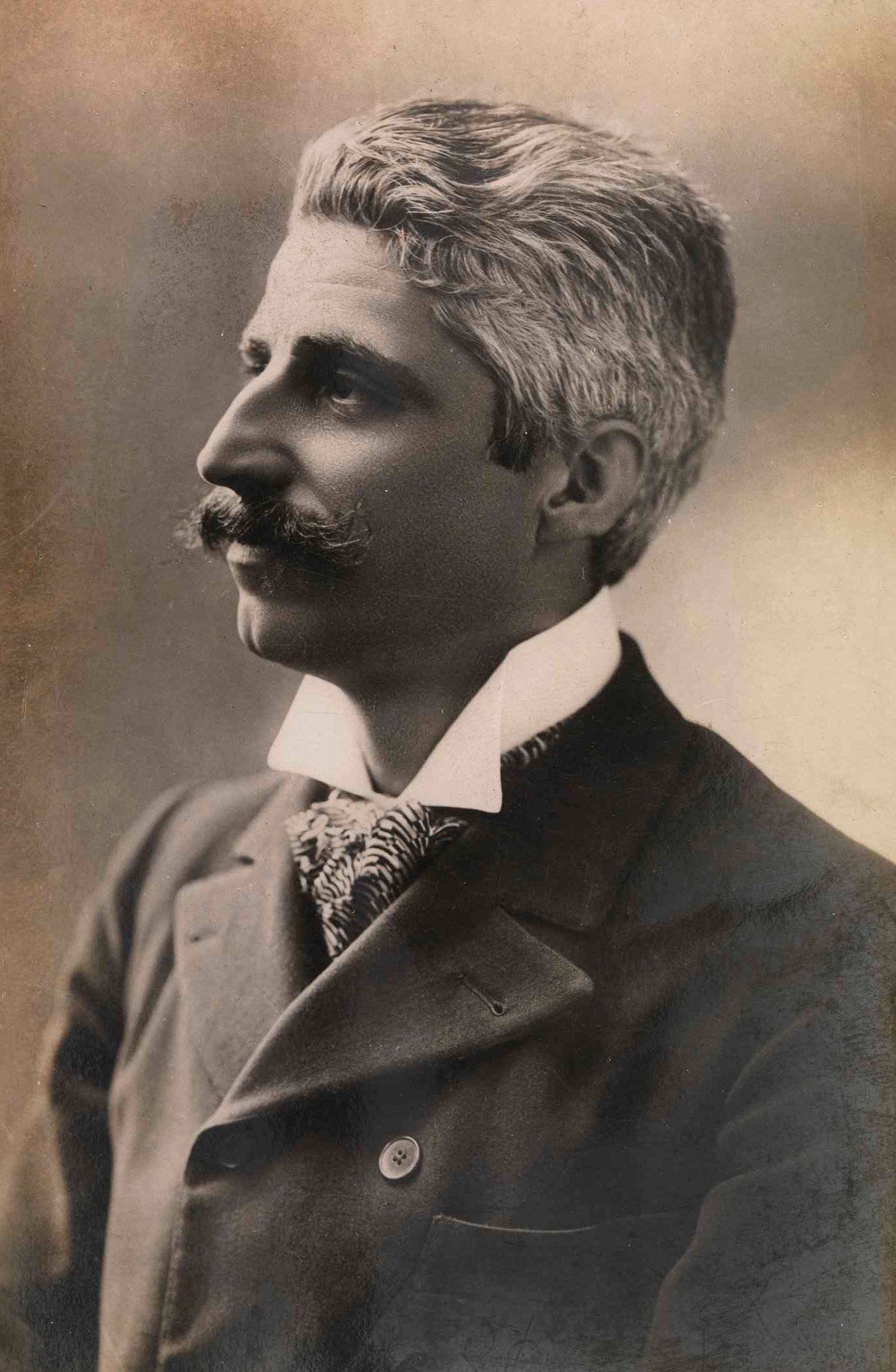
Duarte Leite

- 29 September – Duarte Leite, historian, mathematician, journalist, diplomat and politician (born 1864)
- 14 October – António Maria da Silva, engineer and politician (born 1872)
