= 1946 in Portugal =

- Decades: 1920s; 1930s; 1940s; 1950s; 1960s
- See also: History of Portugal; Timeline of Portuguese history; List of years in Portugal

Events in the year 1946 in Portugal.

== Incumbents ==
- President: Óscar Carmona
- Prime Minister: António de Oliveira Salazar (National Union)

== Arts and entertainment ==
=== Films ===
- Camões

== Sport ==
In association football, for the first-tier league seasons, see 1945–46 Primeira Divisão and 1946–47 Primeira Divisão; for the Taça de Portugal season, see 1945–46 Taça de Portugal.

- 30 June - 1946 Taça de Portugal Final
- Establishment of Clube Oriental de Lisboa
- Establishment of G.C. Alcobaça
- Establishment of SC Mêda

Establishment of the Portuguese Volleyball Championship.

== Births ==
- 13 February - Artur Jorge, football manager, former footballer
- 24 May - Jesualdo Ferreira, football manager
