= 1944 in Portugal =

- Decades: 1920s; 1930s; 1940s; 1950s; 1960s
- See also: History of Portugal; Timeline of Portuguese history; List of years in Portugal

Events in the year 1944 in Portugal.

== Incumbents ==
- President: Óscar Carmona
- Prime Minister: António de Oliveira Salazar (National Union)

== Sports ==
- AC Vila Meã founded
- Almada A.C. founded

== Births ==
- 29 March – Eduardo Prado Coelho, journalist, columnist and university professor (d. 2007)
- 4 July – Joe Berardo, businessman, stock investor and art collector.
- 23 July – Maria João Pires, pianist

== Deaths ==
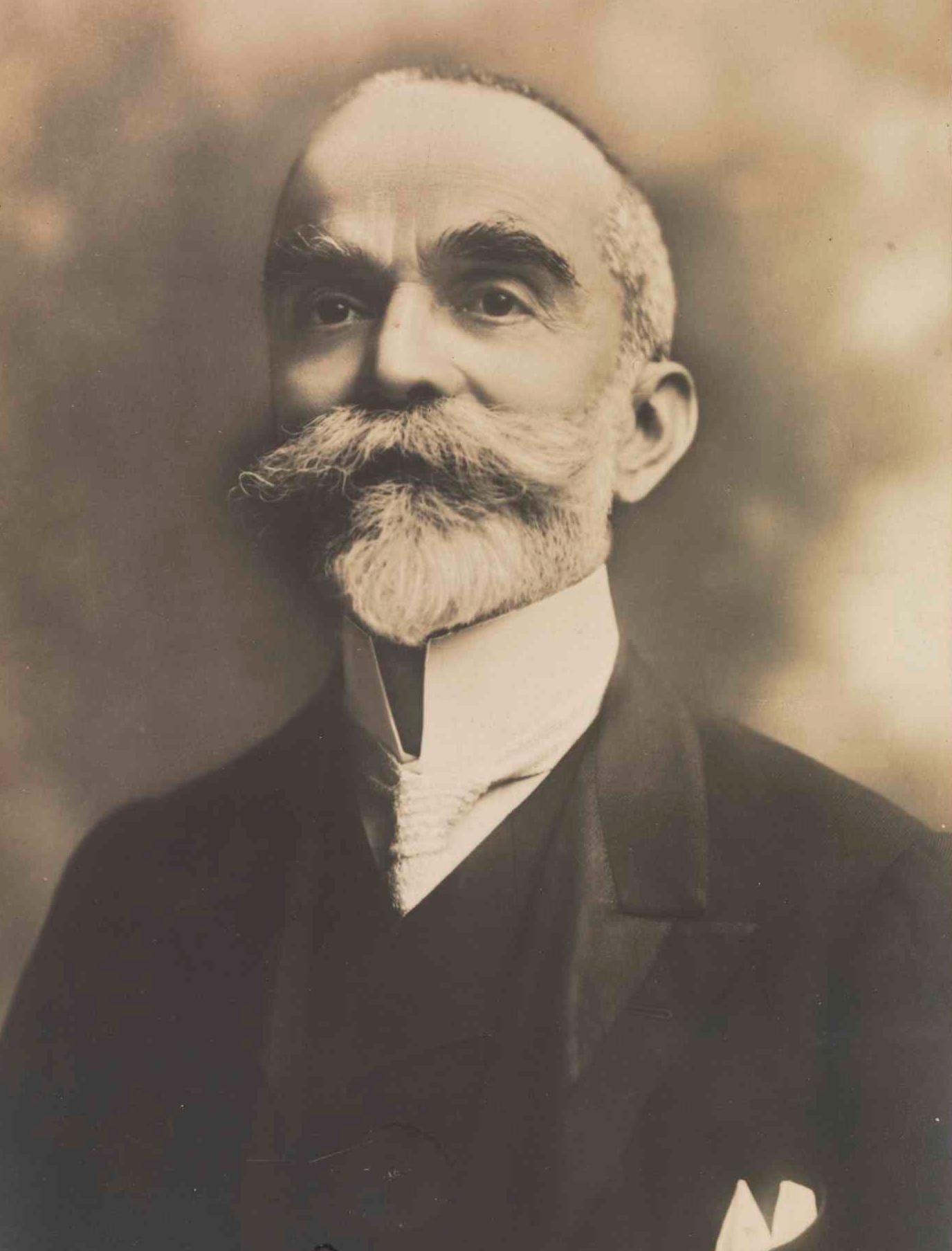
Bernardino Machado

- 29 April – Bernardino Machado, nobleman and politician (born 1851)
