= 1961 Portuguese legislative election =

← 1957	12 November 1961	1965 →

All 130 seats in the National Assembly 66 seats needed for a majority
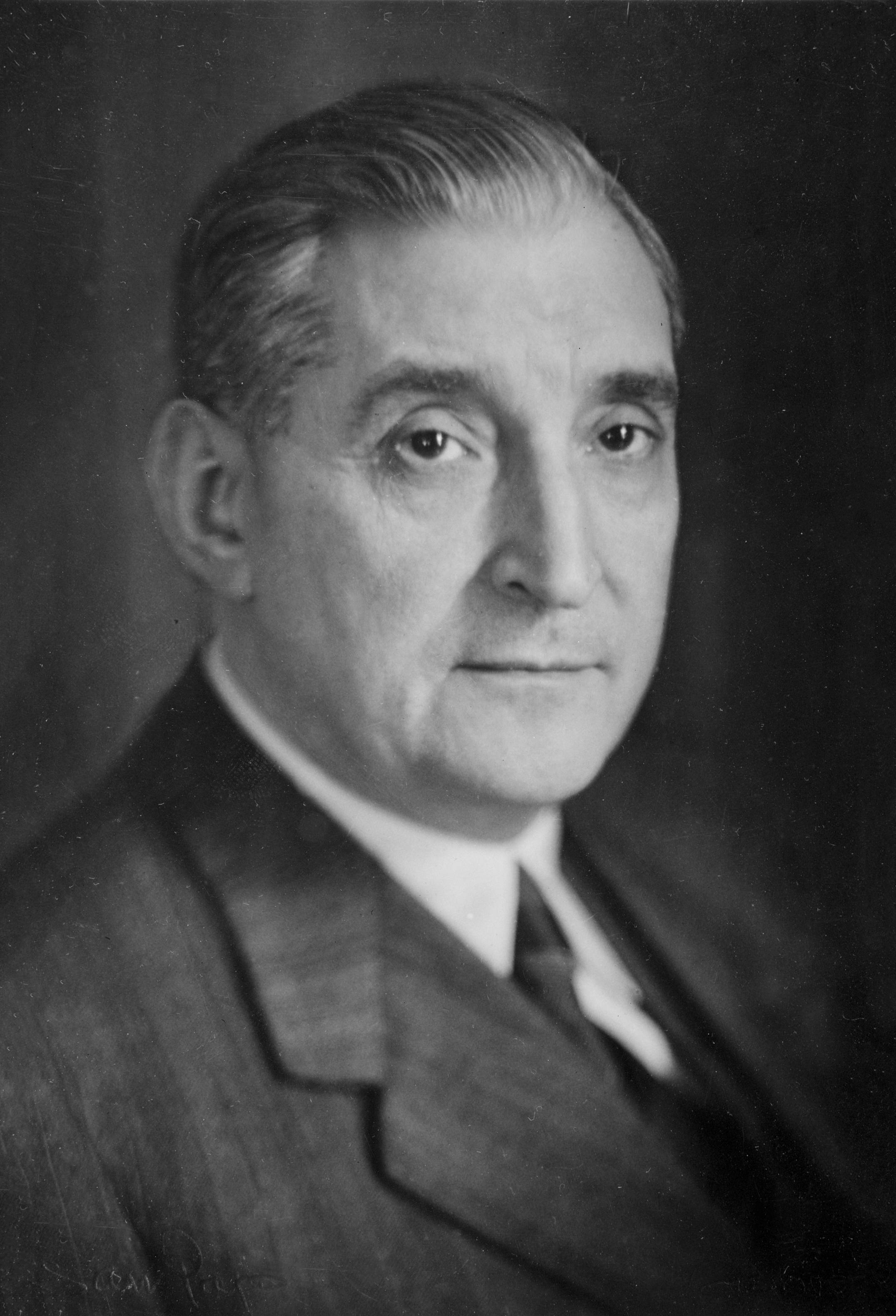
	First party
Leader	António de Oliveira Salazar
Party	UN
Last election	120 seats
Seats won	130
Seat change	▲10
Prime Minister before election
António de Oliveira Salazar
UN
Prime Minister after election
António de Oliveira Salazar
UN

Parliamentary elections were held in Portugal on 12 November 1961. The ruling National Union won all 130 seats unopposed.

== Electoral system ==
The number of seats in the National Assembly was increased from 120 to 130 prior to the elections. The number of seats for Angola and Mozambique was increased from four each to seven each, whilst Portuguese India and Cape Verde each gained a seat, taking their totals to three and two respectively. Mainland Portugal also gained two seats.

Following the granting of Portuguese citizenship to the indigenous inhabitants of Angola and Mozambique, they were entitled to vote for the first time as long as they were literate, held a job in a recognised profession, or were taxpayers.

== Campaign ==
A total of 25 opposition candidates registered to run in the elections on 12 lists. They officially withdrew their candidacies on 7 November, protesting against the government's failure to allow "free and clean elections". The Monarchist list was rejected in Lisbon after arriving to hand in their list a minute late.

== Results ==
Party	Votes	%	Seats
National Union			130
Total			130
Total votes	973,997	–	
Registered voters/turnout	1,315,231	74.06	
Source: Nohlen & Stöver
