= 1973 Portuguese Timorese Legislative Assembly election =

Elections to a Legislative Assembly were held for the first and only time in Portuguese Timor in March 1973.

== Background ==
On 2 May 1972 the Portuguese National Assembly passed the Organic Law for the Overseas Territories, which provided for greater autonomy for overseas territories. The existing Legislative Council was expanded from 14 to 21 seats, with 10 members directly elected.

Candidates were required to be Portuguese citizens who had lived in Portuguese Timor for more than three years and be able to read and write Portuguese. Voters were required to be literate. As the Portuguese constitution banned political parties at the time, the majority of candidates were put forward by the ruling People's National Action movement, although some civic associations were allowed to nominate candidates.

== Results ==
Out of a total population of 610,541, only 12,644 people registered to vote. A total of 11,052 people voted, giving a voter turnout of 87.4%.
