= 1941 in Portugal =

- Decades: 1920s; 1930s; 1940s; 1950s; 1960s
- See also: History of Portugal; Timeline of Portuguese history; List of years in Portugal

Events in the year 1941 in Portugal.

== Incumbents ==
- President: Óscar Carmona
- Prime Minister: António de Oliveira Salazar (National Union)

== Arts and entertainment ==
=== Films ===
- 19 September – release of O Pai Tirano, film comedy directed by António Lopes Ribeiro.

== Sports ==
- S.C. Praiense founded
- SC Alba founded

== Births ==
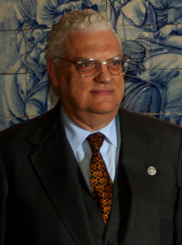
Diogo de Freitas do Amaral

- 21 April – Eduardo Guedes, film-maker (d. 2000)
- 21 July – Diogo de Freitas do Amaral, politician and law professor (d. 2019)
