= 1973 Portuguese legislative election =

← 1969	28 October 1973	1975 →

All 150 seats in the National Assembly 76 seats needed for a majority
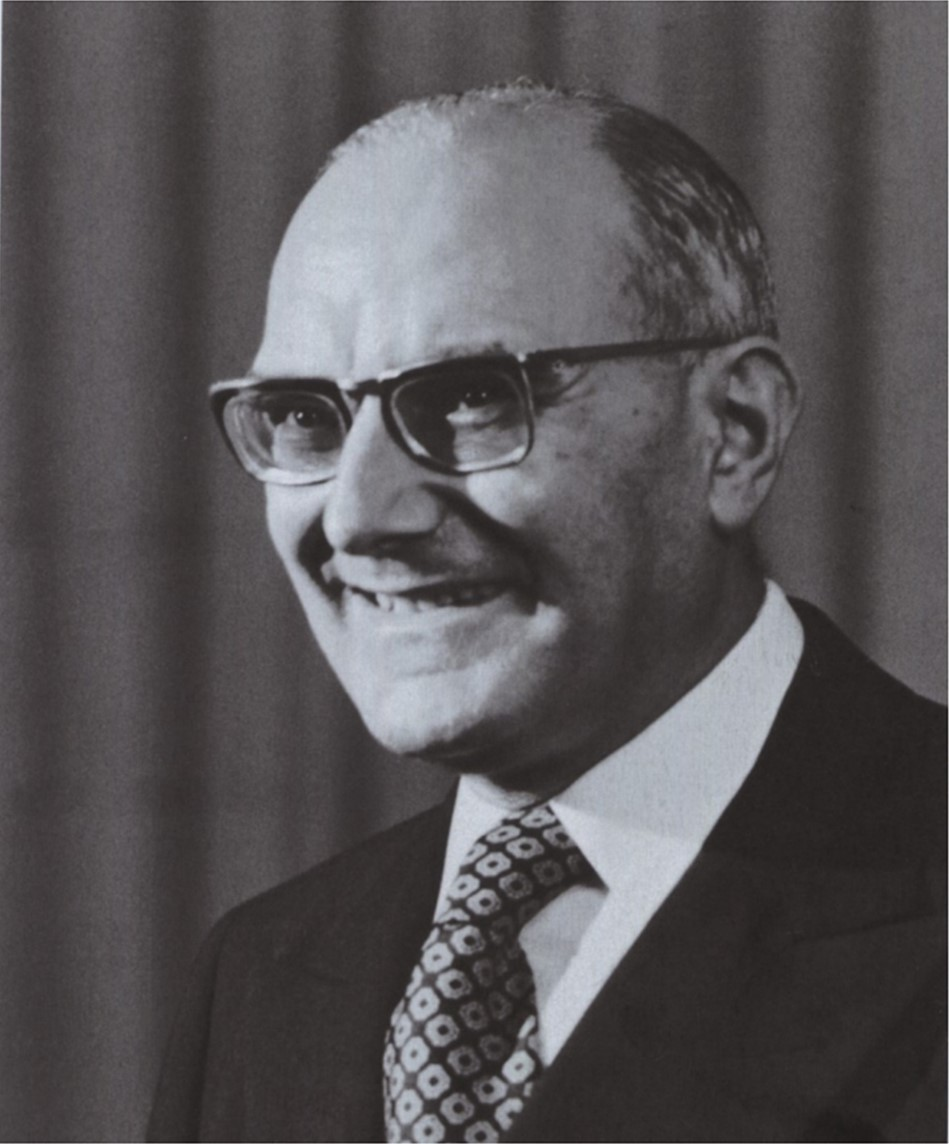
	First party
Leader	Marcello Caetano
Party	ANP
Last election	88.07%, 130 seats
Seats won	150
Seat change	▲20
Prime Minister before election
Marcello Caetano
ANP
Prime Minister after election
Marcello Caetano
ANP

Parliamentary elections were held in Portugal on 28 October 1973. After the only opposition party withdrew from the election, the ruling People's National Action (ANP)—formerly the National Union—was the sole party to contest the election, winning all 150 seats. The 1973 election would be the last held under the Estado Novo, as five months later, the Carnation Revolution would bring down the regime. In 1975, the Constituent Assembly of Portugal was elected in the first democratic elections since 1925.

== Electoral system ==
The electoral system, constitutionally amended in 1971, maintained the National Assembly to be elected through plurality voting with semi-open party list in 22 constituencies, with all seats of a constituency going to a sole victor. Voters were formally allowed to strike out individual names. The Chamber of Corporations, consisting of 200 members or more, was appointed by the government following its re-endorsement by the new National Assembly, the last to be before the Carnation Revolution next year.

All natural-born nationals residing in Portugal for the past five years were allowed to stand for election, with all mature, literate citizens officially enlisted for the process. An additional 962,854 overseas citizens participated in an election to the National Assembly for the first time. Some scarcely populated remote countryside regions in the Portuguese overseas territories of Angola and Mozambique were infiltrated by pro-independence guerrillas. Most of Portuguese Guinea (now Guinea-Bissau) was under the control or heavy influence of the guerrillas at the time.

== Campaign ==
Campaigning began on 28 September under the supervision of the regime, while illegal rallies began as early as April. The governing National Union reorganized itself as the People's National Action in 1970. It held its first and only congress as the ANP in May, supervised by party leader and Prime Minister Marcelo Caetano. While Caetano had spent much of his tenure blunting the regime's harsher edges, at bottom he was an authoritarian himself. The heavy handed repression of opposition candidates four years earlier showed he was not willing to move toward democracy.

Following the premature withdrawal of the PDM/CDE, the only opposition party allowed to run on 25 October, due to complaints about its democratic legitimacy, the eligibility and rights of its 66 candidates were revoked for five years.

== Results ==
Party	Votes	%	Seats
People's National Action			150
Total			150
Total votes	1,393,294	–	
Registered voters/turnout	2,096,020	66.47	
Source: Inter-Parliamentary Union
