= Manuel Rodrigues =

Manuel Rodrigues may refer to:

- Manuel Rodrigues (footballer, born 1905) (1905-deceased), Portuguese footballer who played as a forward
- Manuel C. Rodrigues (1908-1991), Indian poet
- Manuel Rodrigues (footballer, born 1942), Portuguese footballer who played as a defender
