= 1957 Portuguese legislative election in Angola =

Elections to the Portuguese National Assembly were held in Angola in 1957 as part of the wider Portuguese elections.

== Electoral system ==
The franchise was restricted, with only 56,108 of the population of approximately 4,335,000 registered to vote.

== Results ==
A total of 49,084 voters participated in the election, giving a voter turnout of 87.5%.
