= Álvaro Lins =

Brazilian journalist, professor and literary critic (1912–1970)

Álvaro de Barros Lins
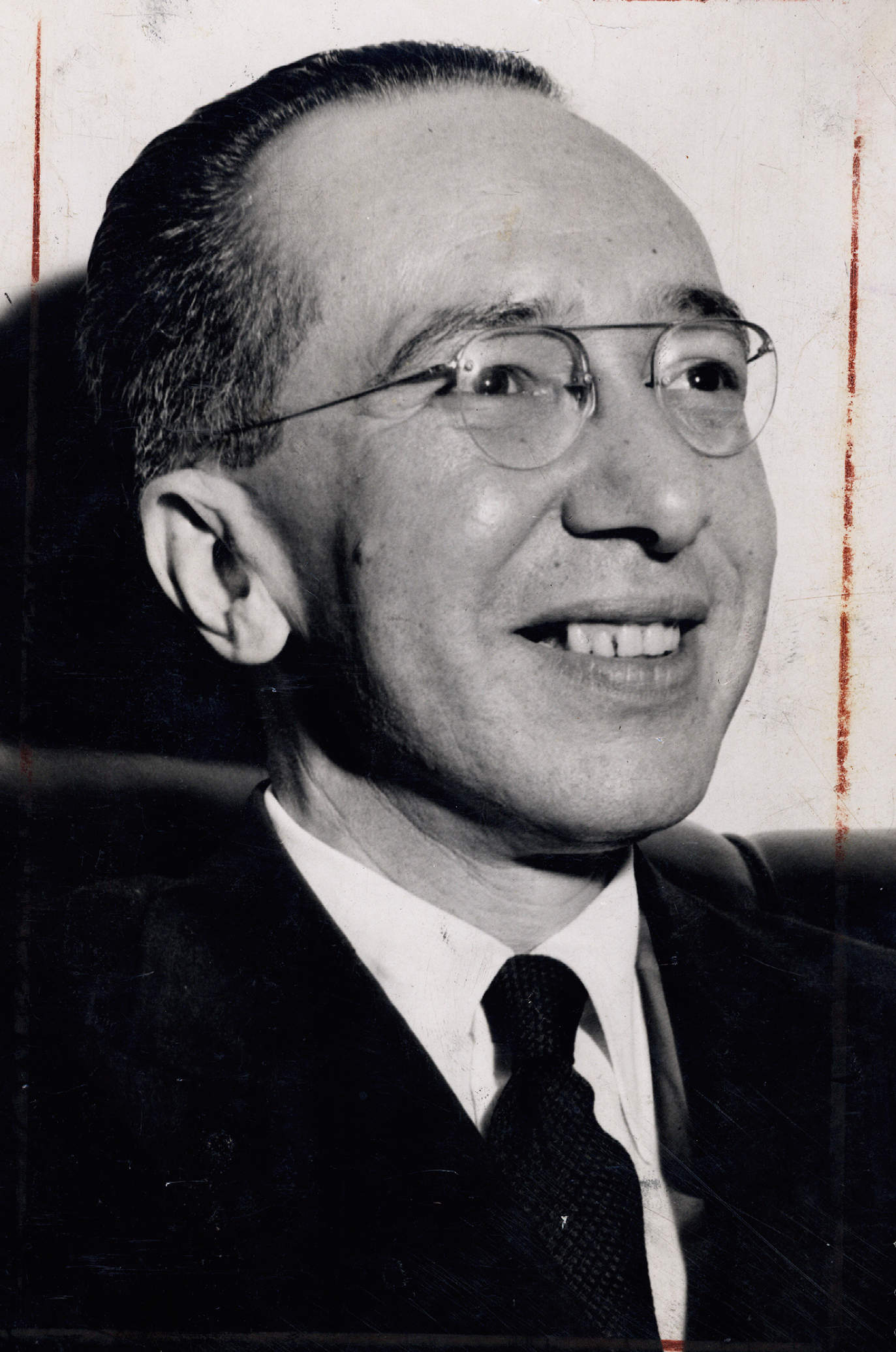
- Álvaro Lins in 1964.
- Born: December 14, 1912
- Died: June 4, 1970 (aged 57)
- Occupations: Journalist; professor; literary critic; lawyer
- Spouse: Heloísa Ramos Lins
- Children: 2
- Parent: Pedro Alexandrino Lins (father)

Álvaro de Barros Lins (December 14, 1912 – June 4, 1970) was a Brazilian journalist, professor, literary critic and lawyer.

== Family ==
Lins was married to Heloísa Ramos Lins, with whom he had two children.

== Career ==
=== Journalism ===
The son of Pedro Alexandrino Lins and Francisca de Barros Lins, Álvaro Lins took the primary course in his hometown, moving to attend high school at Salesian College and Padre Félix Gymnasium, both in Recife. There he entered the Faculty of Law of the University of Recife in 1931, obtaining a bachelor's degree in 1935. At the age of 20, as a representative of the Student Directory, Lins produced his first work, called The university as a School of Public Men. From 1932 to 1940, he was also a professor of general geography and history of civilization in several schools in the city.

In October 1934, invited by the then intervenor and later governor of Pernambuco, Carlos de Lima Cavalcanti, Lins assumed the position of Secretary of the State Government. He was part, in 1936, of the plate of the Social Democratic Party (PSD) of Pernambuco, to run for a seat in the House of Representatives. However, the coup that established the Estado Novo interrupted the elections and Lins left the Secretariat of State in November 1937 and put his political ambitions on hold.

From there, he became a print journalist, working at Diário da Manhã of Pernambuco from 1937 to 1940, where he was editor and director. Moving to Rio de Janeiro, he began to make literary criticism, a genre that gave him national fame. There, he was a journalist for Diário de Notícias, Diários Associados between 1939 and 1940, and editor-in-chief of Correio da Manhã from 1940 to 1956. In 1952, he left for Portugal to teach Brazilian studies at the Faculty of Philosophy and Letters of the University of Lisbon. There is also collaboration of his authorship in the Luso-Brazilian magazine Atlântico.

Returning to Brazil in August 1954 because of the crisis triggered by the suicide of Getúlio Vargas, he resumed journalism and the chair of Brazilian Literature at Colégio Pedro II.

=== Literary work at the Academia Brasileira de Letras ===
On April 5, 1955, at the age of 42, he was unanimously elected to become the fourth occupant of chair 17 of the Brazilian Academy of Letters, vacant after the death of Edgar Roquette-Pinto, being received by the academic João Neves da Fontoura on July 7, 1956.

=== Other jobs ===
Lins was Brazilian ambassador to Portugal from November 1956 to October 1959. He was the president of the 1st Inter-American Conference of Amnesty for Exiles and Political Prisoners of Spain and Portugal, based at the São Paulo Law School in 1960, and director of the literary supplement of the Daily News between March 1961 and June 1964. In 1962, he headed the Brazilian delegation to the World Peace Congress, held in Moscow. Retiring from the newspaper in 1964, Álvaro Lins devoted his last years to writing books. On 30 December 1957, he was awarded the Grand Cross of the Military Order of Christ of Portugal and on 28 December 1994 he was awarded a posthumous title with the Grand Cross of the Order of Liberty of Portugal.

== Books ==
In Portuguese.

- A universidade como escola de homens públicos, 1933
- História literária de Eça de Queiroz, 1939
- Alguns aspectos da decadência do Império, 1939
- Jornal de crítica: primeira série, 1941
- Poesia e personalidade de Antero de Quental, 1942
- Jornal de crítica: segunda série, 1943
- Notas de um diário de crítica - Primeiro volume, 1943
- Palestra sobre José Veríssimo, 1943
- Jornal de crítica: terceira série, 1944
- Rio Branco, 1945
- Jornal de crítica: quarta série, 1946
- No mundo do romance policial, 1947
- Jornal de crítica: quinta série, 1947
- Jornal de crítica: sexta série, 1951
- A técnica do romance em Marcel Proust, 1951
- Roteiro literário do Brasil e de Portugal: antologia da língua portuguesa, 1956
- Discurso sobre Camões e Portugal, 1956
- Discurso de posse na Academia, 1956
- Missão em Portugal: diário de uma experiência diplomática - I, 1960
- A glória de César e o punhal de Brutus, 1962
- Os mortos de sobrecasaca, 1963
- O relógio e o quadrante, 1963
- Girassol em vermelho e azul, 1963
- Dionísios nos trópicos, 1963
- Jornal de crítica: sétima série, 1963
- Jornal de crítica: oitava série, 1963
- Notas de um diário de crítica - Segundo volume, 1963
- Literatura e vida literária, 1963
- Sagas literárias e teatro moderno no Brasil, 1967
- Filosofia, história e crítica na literatura brasileira, 1967
- Poesia moderna no Brasil, 1967
- O romance brasileiro, 1967
- Teoria literária, 1967

== Awards ==
- Centenário de Antero de Quental Award, for the essay Poesia e personalidade de Antero de Quental, 1942
- Felipe de Oliveira Award, from the Sociedade Felipe de Oliveira, 1945, for the book Rio Branco, 1945
- Pandiá Calógeras Award, from the Associação Brasileira de Escritores, for the book Rio Branco, 1945
- Grã-Cruz da Ordem Nacional do Mérito, 1956
- Grã-Cruz da Ordem de Cristo, Portugal, 1957
- Jabuti Personality of the Year Award, from the Câmara Brasileira do Livro, for the book Missão em Portugal, 1960
- Luiza Cláudio de Souza Award, for the books Os mortos de sobrecasaca and Jornal de crítica Sétima série, 1963
