= 1947 in Portugal =

- Decades: 1920s; 1930s; 1940s; 1950s; 1960s
- See also: History of Portugal; Timeline of Portuguese history; List of years in Portugal

Events in the year 1947 in Portugal.

== Incumbents ==
- President: Óscar Carmona
- Prime Minister: António de Oliveira Salazar (National Union)

== Events ==
- Establishment of the Fabrica Nacional de Municoes de Armas Ligeiras

== Arts and entertainment ==
- 3 June - Inauguration of the Cinema Batalha, in Porto

== Sport ==
In association football, for the first-tier league seasons, see 1946–47 Primeira Divisão and 1947–48 Primeira Divisão; for the Taça de Portugal season, see 1947–48 Taça de Portugal.

- 10 August - Establishment of G.D. Sesimbra
- Establishment of C.D. Beja
- Establishment of O Elvas C.A.D.
- Establishment of S.C. Praiense
- World Fencing Championships, in Lisbon

== Births ==
- 9 February - José de Matos-Cruz, writer, journalist, editor, high-school teacher, investigator, encyclopedist
- 15 August - Mário Barroso, film director, actor, cinematographer
- 16 November - Luís Filipe Rocha, film director, screenwriter, actor
