= 1951 Portuguese presidential election =

← 1949	22 July 1951	1958 →
- Turnout: 77.17% (▼0.44pp)
Candidate	Francisco Craveiro Lopes
Party	UN
President before election
Óscar Carmona
UN
Elected President
Francisco Craveiro Lopes
UN

Presidential elections were held in Portugal on 22 July 1951, five years earlier than scheduled due to the death of President Óscar Carmona on 18 April 1951.

Francisco Craveiro Lopes won the election unopposed after Manuel Quintão Meireles withdrew, while Rui Luís Gomes was removed from the ballot after being declared a communist by the Salazar dictatorship.

== Results ==
Candidate	Party	Votes	%
Francisco Craveiro Lopes	National Union		
Manuel Quintão Meireles (withdrew)	Independent		
Total			
Total votes		965,236	–
Registered voters/turnout		1,250,746	77.17
Source: ISCSP, De Almeida
