= 1957 Portuguese legislative election =

← 1953	3 November 1957	1961 →

All 120 seats in the National Assembly 61 seats needed for a majority
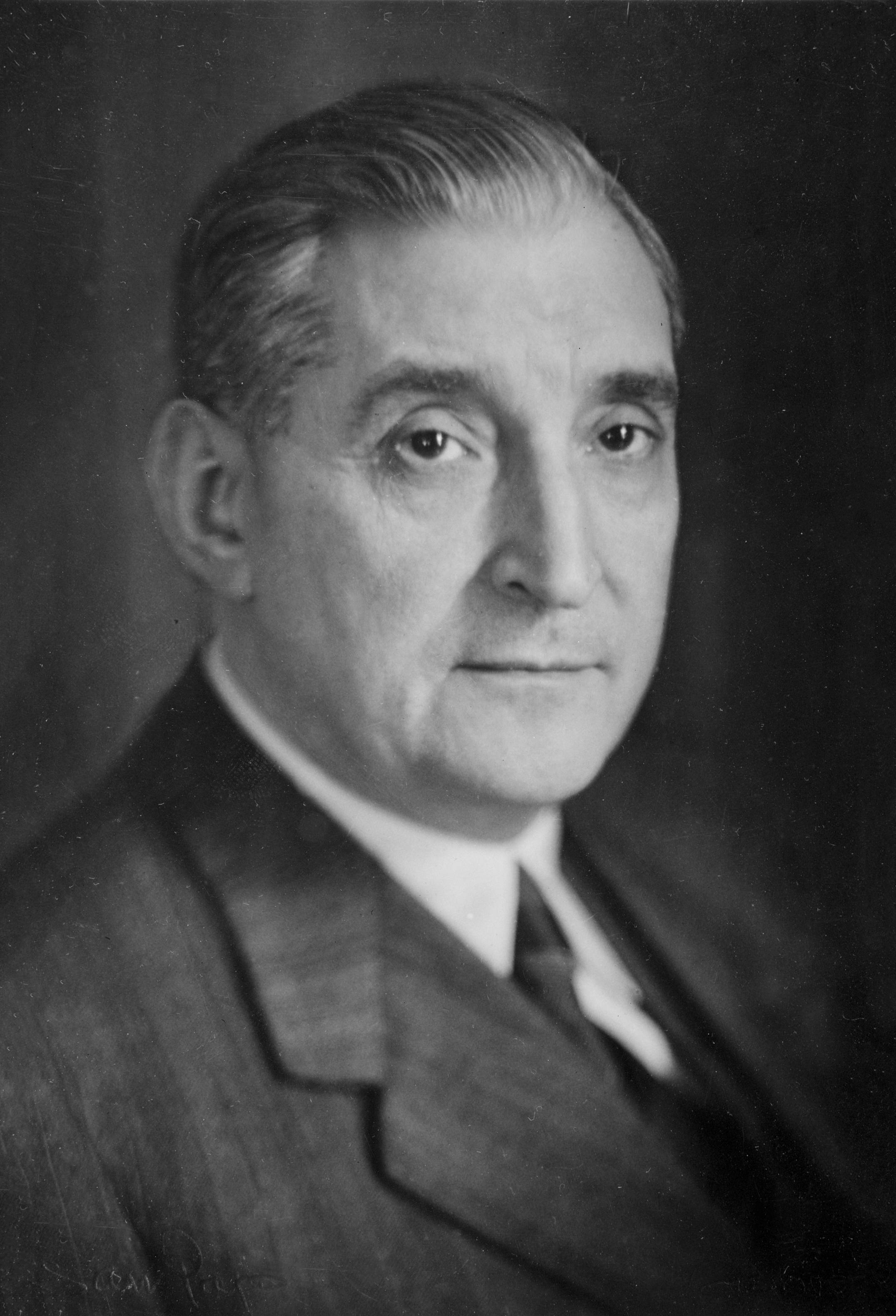
	First party
Leader	António de Oliveira Salazar
Party	UN
Last election	120 seats
Seats won	120
Seat change	Steady
Prime Minister before election
António de Oliveira Salazar
UN
Prime Minister after election
António de Oliveira Salazar
UN

Parliamentary elections were held in Portugal on 3 November 1957. The ruling National Union won all 120 seats.

== Electoral system ==
The elections were held using 21 multi-member constituencies and one single-member constituency covering the Azores, together electing a total of 120 members, 13 of which were from Portuguese colonies.

Voters could delete names from the lists of candidates, but could not replace them. Suffrage was given to all men aged 21 or over as long as they were literate or paid over 100 escudos in taxation, and to women aged over 21 if they had completed secondary education, or if they were the head of a household and met the same literacy and tax criteria as men.

== Campaign ==
Although the majority of the opposition to the Estado Novo regime boycotted the election in protest at the lack of a free vote, a total of 34 opposition candidates attempted to register for the elections, 12 in Lisbon, 10 in Porto, six in Aveiro and six in Braga. The Lisbon candidates were rejected as their application was a day late, whilst the Porto and Aveiro candidates withdrew after failing to receive a guarantee that they could observe vote counting. Only the six candidates in Braga ultimately contested the election.

== Results ==
Party	Votes	%	Seats
National Union			120
Opposition lists			0
Total			120
Total votes	911,618	–	
Registered voters/turnout	1,294,368	70.43	
Source: Nohlen & Stöver

== See also ==
- Politics of Portugal
- List of political parties in Portugal
- Elections in Portugal
