= 1934 Portuguese legislative election =

- 16 December 1934

All 100 seats in the National Assembly 51 seats needed for a majority
	First party
Leader	António de Oliveira Salazar
Party	UN
Seats won	100
Prime Minister before election
António de Oliveira Salazar
UN
Prime Minister after election
António de Oliveira Salazar
UN

Parliamentary elections were held in Portugal on 16 December 1934, the first following the establishment of the one-party state known as the Estado Novo. The National Union was the only party to contest the elections, and no opposition candidates were allowed to run. It subsequently won all seats in the National Assembly, three of which were taken by women.

== Electoral system ==
For the elections the country formed a single 100-member constituency. Suffrage was extended to all men aged 21 or over as long as they were literate or paid over 100 escudos in taxation, and to women aged over 21 if they had completed secondary education. However, only 8.2% of the population were registered to vote.

== Results ==
Party	Votes	%	Seats
National Union			100
Total			100
Total votes	476,706	–	
Registered voters/turnout	588,957	80.94	
Source: Nohlen & Stöver

== See also ==
- Politics of Portugal
- List of political parties in Portugal
- Elections in Portugal
