= 1942 Portuguese presidential election =

← 1935	8 February 1942	1949 →
- Turnout: 91.12% (▲6.83pp)
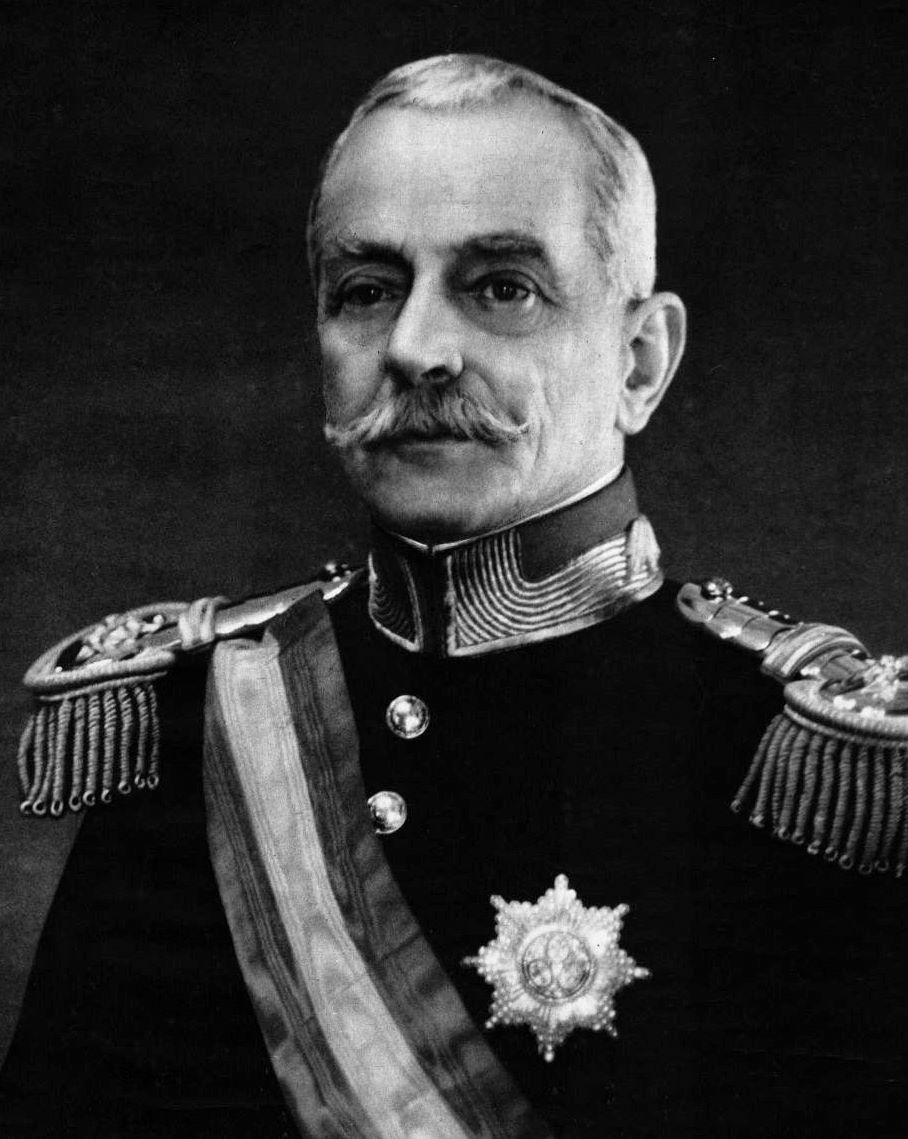
Candidate	Óscar Carmona
Party	UN
Percentage	90.7%
President before election
Óscar Carmona
UN
Elected President
Óscar Carmona
UN

Presidential elections were held in Portugal on 8 February 1942. Óscar Carmona ran unopposed and was reelected for a third term.

== Electoral system ==
According to the 1933 Constitution of Portugal, a president is elected for a period of 7 years and whoever gets the more votes is elected as president. Candidates must be Portuguese citizens, older than 35, in full possession of their civil and political rights, and must have always had Portuguese nationality. Family members of the King of Portugal, up to the 6th degree, could not become presidents.

Voters had to be 21 years or older and, for women they had to have secondary or college education, while, for men, they only had to prove they were able to read, write, and count or had been taxed at least 100 escudos.

== Results ==
Candidate	Votes	%
Óscar Carmona		90.7
Total		
Total votes	829,042	–
Registered voters/turnout	909,790	91.12
Source: ISCSP, De Almeida
