= 1938 Portuguese legislative election =

- 30 October 1938

All 100 seats in the National Assembly 51 seats needed for a majority
	First party
Leader	António de Oliveira Salazar
Party	UN
Last election	100 seats
Seats won	100
Seat change	Steady
Prime Minister before election
António de Oliveira Salazar
UN
Prime Minister after election
António de Oliveira Salazar
UN

Parliamentary elections were held in Portugal on 30 October 1938. The country was a one-party state at the time and the National Union was the only party to contest the elections, with no opposition candidates allowed to run.

== Electoral system ==
For the elections the country formed a single 100-member constituency. All men aged 21 or over were eligible to vote as long as they were literate or paid over 100 escudos in taxation, whilst women aged over 21 had to have completed secondary education to do so. However, only 11% of the population were registered to vote.

== Results ==
Party	Votes	%	Seats
National Union			100
Total			100
Total votes	694,290	–	
Registered voters/turnout	829,054	83.74	
Source: Nohlen & Stöver

== See also ==
- Politics of Portugal
- List of political parties in Portugal
- Elections in Portugal
