= Alice Vieira =

Portuguese writer (born 1943)

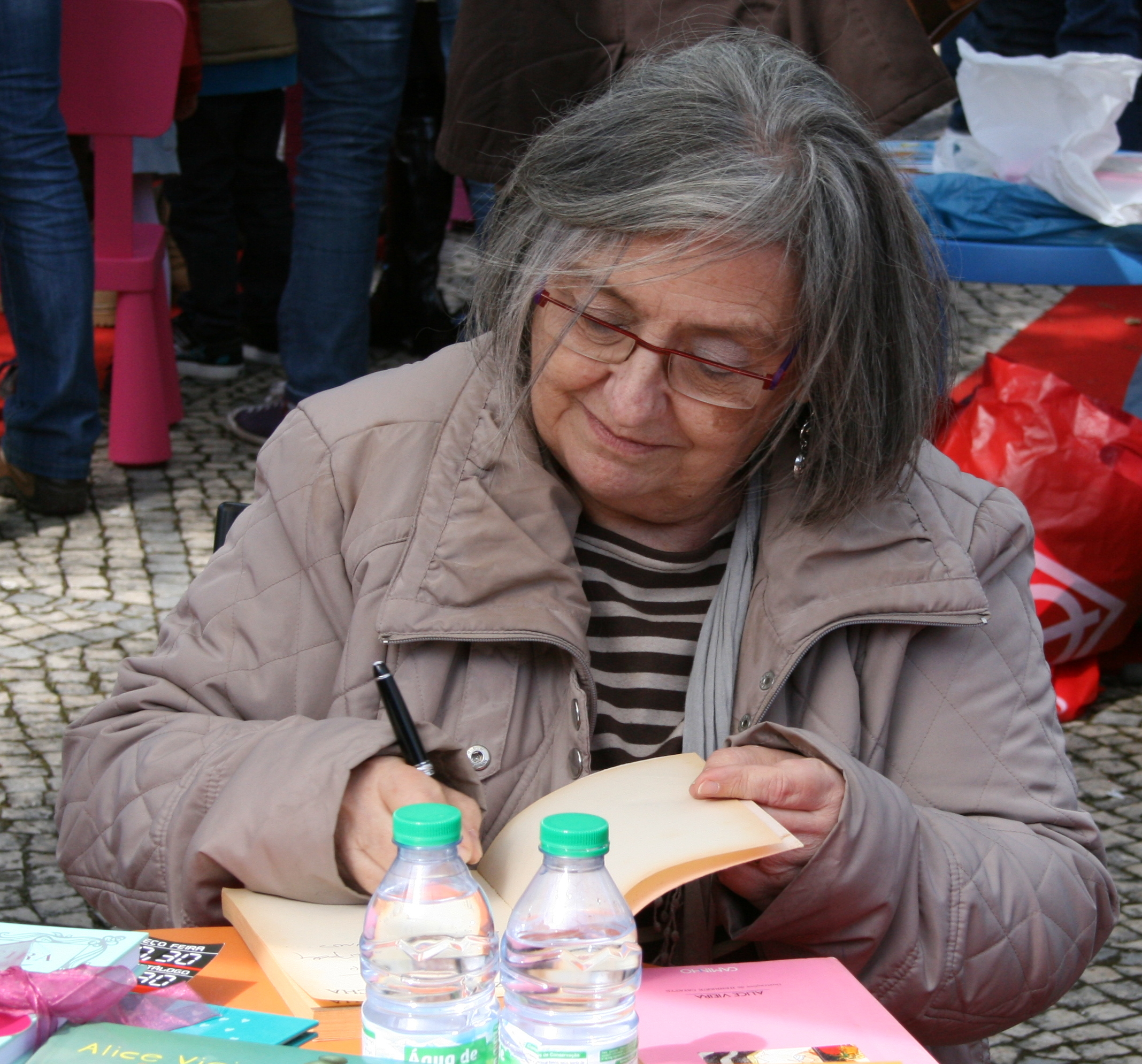
Alice Vieira in Lisbon Book Fair of 2012

Alice Vieira (born 20 March 1943 in Lisbon) is a Portuguese children's and adult books author.

== Biography ==
Vieira graduated from the University of Lisbon with a thesis about Bernard Shaw's theatre. She worked as a journalist before devoting almost all her time to writing books for children and young adults. She has published already more than eight dozen titles and won several prestigious awards in Portugal in the field of literature for children and teenagers.

Her books have been translated to Bulgarian, Catalan, Chinese, Dutch, French, Galician, German, Hungarian, Italian, Korean, Russian, Serbo-Croatian, Spanish.

== Juvenile literature ==
- 1979 – Rosa, Minha Irmã Rosa
- 1979 – Paulina ao Piano
- 1980 – Lote 12 – 2º Frente
- 1982 – Chocolate à Chuva
- 1981 – A Espada do Rei Afonso
- 1983 – Este Rei que eu Escolhi
- 1984 – Graças e Desgraças na Corte de El Rei Tadinho
- 1985 – Águas de Verão
- 1986 – Flor de Mel
- 1987 – Viagem à Roda do meu Nome
- 1988 – Às Dez a Porta Fecha
- 1990 – Úrsula, a Maior
- 1990 – Os Olhos de Ana Marta
- 1991 – Promontório da Lua
- 1995 – Caderno de Agosto
- 1997 – Se Perguntarem por mim, Digam que Voei
- 2001 – Trisavó de Pistola à Cinta
- 2008 – Vinte Cinco a Sete Vozes
- 2008 – Um Fio de Fumo nos Confins do Mar
- 2008 – O Casamento da Minha Mãe
- 2008 – A Vida Nas palavras de Inês Tavares
- 2010 – Meia Hora Para Mudar a Minha Vida
- 2009 – A Lua Não Está à Venda

=== Books for children ===
- 1986 – De que são Feitos os Sonhos
- 1988 – As Mãos de Lam Seng
- 1988 – O que Sabem os Pássaros
- 1988 – As Árvores que Ninguém Separa
- 1988 – Um Estranho Baralho de Asas
- 1988 – O Tempo da Promessa
- 1990 – Macau: da Lenda à História
- 1991 – Corre, Corre, Cabacinha
- 1991 – Um Ladrão debaixo da Cama
- 1991 – Fita, Pente e Espelho
- 1991 – A Adivinha do Rei
- 1992 – Rato do Campo, Rato da Cidade
- 1992 – Periquinho e Periquinha
- 1992 – Maria das Silvas
- 1993 – As Três Fiandeiras
- 1993 – A Bela Moura
- 1994 – O Pássaro Verde
- 2006 – Livro com Cheiro a Chocolate
- 2007 – Livro com Cheiro a Morango
- 2007 – Livro com Cheiro a Baunilha
- 2008 – Livro com Cheiro a Caramelo
- 2009 – Livro com Cheiro a Canela
- 2010 – Livro com Cheiro a Banana
- 2010 – Contos de Grimm Para Meninos Valentes
- 2010 – Contos de Andersen para Meninos Sem Medo
- 2011 – Contos de Perrault para Crianças Aventureiras
- 2010 – A Arca do Tesouro (com música de Eurico Carrapatoso)
- 2011 – Charada da Bicharada
- 2011 – Rimas Perfeitas, Imperfeitas e Mais que Perfeitas

=== Books for adults ===
- 2010 – Os Profetas (romance)
- 2007 – Dois Corpos Tombando na Água (poesia—Prémio Mª Amália Vaz de Carvalho
- 2009 – O Que Dói às Aves" (poesia)
- 1994 – Esta Lisboa
- 1997 – Praias de Portugal
- 2003 – Tejo (com fotografias de Neni Glock)
- 2004 – Bica Escaldada (crónicas)
- 2005 – Pezinhos de Coentrada (crónicas
- 2006 – O Que se Leva Desta Vida (crónicas)
- 2014 – "Os Armários da Noite" (poesia)

== Awards ==
- 1979 – Prémio de Literatura Infantil Ano Internacional da Criança, for Rosa, Minha Irmã Rosa.
- 1983 – Prémio Calouste Gulbenkian de Literatura Infantil, for Este Rei que Eu Escolhi.
- 1994 – Prémio Gulbenkian, for her overall work.
- 2000 – Prix Octogone, for the French translation of "Os Olhos de Ana Marta".
- 2010 – Silver Star of the Peter Pan Award, for the Swedish translation of "Flor de Mel".
