= 1965 Portuguese legislative election =

- 7 November 1965

All 130 seats in the National Assembly 66 seats needed for a majority
	First party
Leader	António de Oliveira Salazar
Party	UN
Last election	130 seats
Prime Minister before election
António de Oliveira Salazar
UN
Prime Minister after election
António de Oliveira Salazar
UN

Parliamentary elections were held in Portugal on 7 November 1965.

== Campaign ==
Five opposition lists registered to compete in the elections, but four withdrew in protest at a lack of freedom in campaigning. The remaining Social Democrat list called for self-determination in Portuguese colonies in Africa.

== Results ==
Party	Votes	%
National Union		
Social Democratic list		
Total		
Total votes	998,542	–
Registered voters/turnout	1,357,459	73.56
Source: Nohlen & Stöver
