= 1969 Portuguese legislative election =

- 26 October 1969

All 130 seats in the National Assembly 66 seats needed for a majority
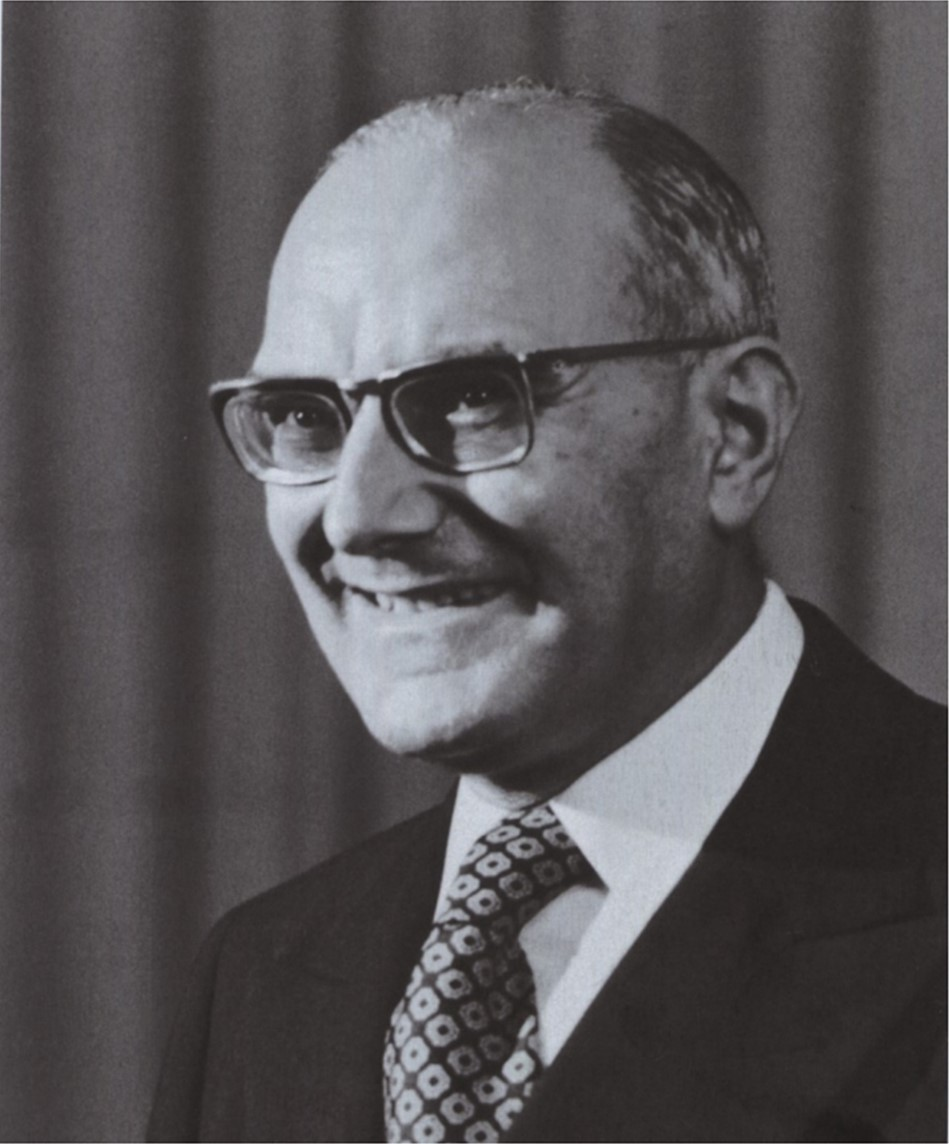

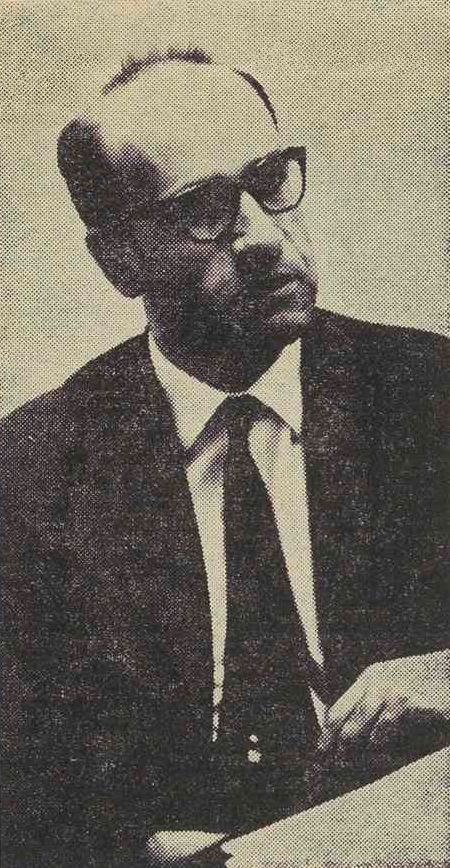
	First party	Second party
Leader	Marcello Caetano	Francisco Pereira de Moura
Party	UN	CDE
Seats won	130	0
Popular vote	981,263	114,745
Percentage	88.1%	10.3%
Prime Minister before election
Marcello Caetano
UN
Prime Minister after election
Marcello Caetano
UN

Parliamentary elections were held in Portugal on 26 October 1969. The elections were announced on 12 August, and were the first under the Prime Minister Marcello Caetano, appointed in the previous year to replace the long-term Prime Minister António de Oliveira Salazar, who had been left incapacitated after a stroke. The ruling National Union won all seats with an official turnout of 62.5%.

== Electoral system ==
The constitution of 1933 stated that elections were to be held in all of Portugal's 18 constituencies by majority party list system, with all seats in each constituency going to the party list with a plurality of votes. In order to select a specific candidate, voters were formally able to strike out names.

The electoral law of 5 December 1958 (rearranged to allow for the National Assembly to appoint the president) guaranteed universal suffrage for all mature, literate citizens, but unofficially curtailed female participation. All natural-born nationals residing in Portugal for the previous five years were allowed to stand for election. The Chamber of Corporations, consisting of 200 members or more, was appointed by the government following the election to the National Assembly.

Although Caetano had made some effort to blunt the harsher edges of the regime, the election took place in an environment little different from the past 40 years. Numerous opposition candidates bowed out of the race prematurely due to reportedly extensive harassment and voter manipulation. After the election, the government banned the two opposition "electoral commissions" and ordered them dissolved.

== Parties ==
The major parties involved and the respective leaders:

- Democratic Electoral Commission (CDE), Francisco Pereira de Moura
- Monarchist Electoral Commission (CEM), Henrique Barrilaro Ruas
- National Union (UN), Marcello Caetano
- United Democratic Electoral Commission (CEUD), Mário Soares

== Results ==
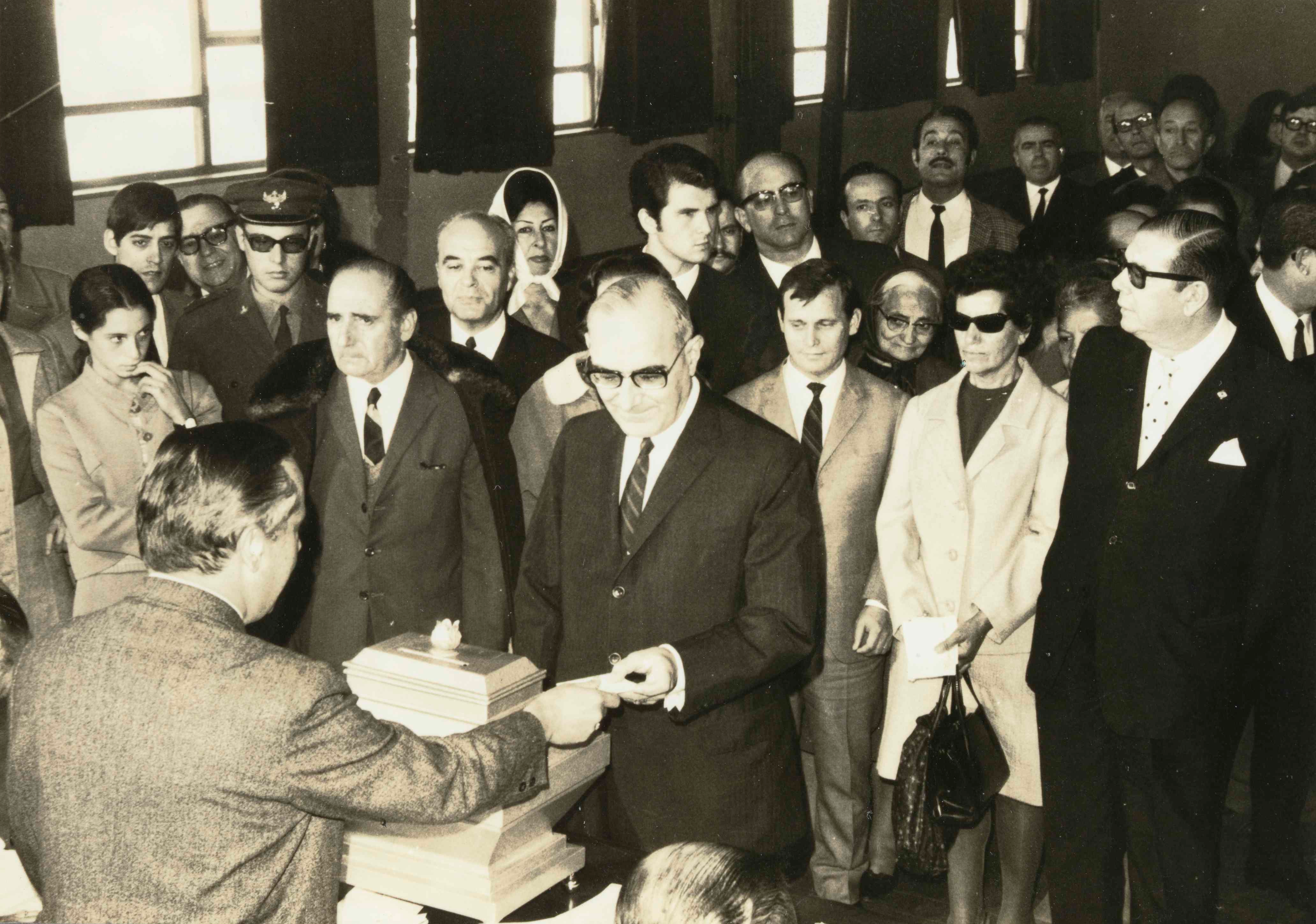
Marcelo Caetano casting his ballot.

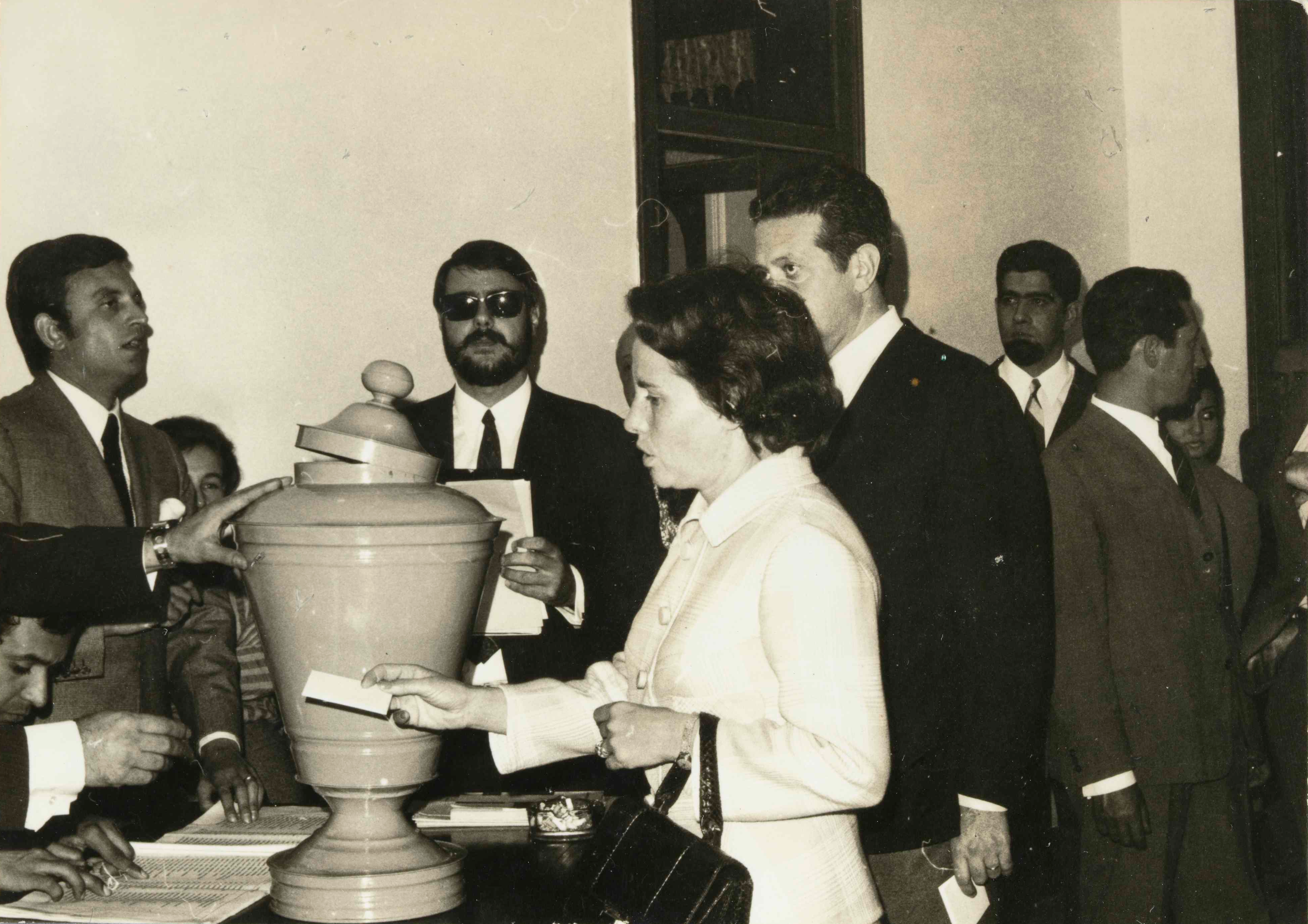
Mário Soares and his wife, Maria Barroso, casting their ballots.

Party	Votes	%	Seats
National Union	981,263	88.07	130
Democratic Electoral Commission	114,745	10.30	0
United Democratic Electoral Commission	16,863	1.51	0
Monarchist Electoral Commission	1,324	0.12	0
Total	1,114,195	100.00	130
Valid votes	1,114,195	99.91	
Invalid/blank votes	1,053	0.09	
Total votes	1,115,248	100.00	
Registered voters/turnout	1,784,341	62.50	
Source: Inter-Parliamentary Union
