= António Costa Pinto =

Portuguese academic (born 1953)

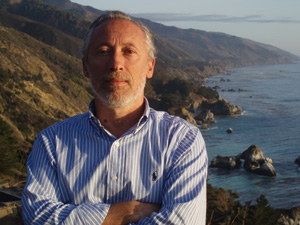
- Born: 1953 (age 72–73); Portugal
- Education: University of Lisbon; European University Institute
- Scientific career
- Fields: Political sciences; European history
- Workplaces: Stanford University; Georgetown University; St Antony's College, Oxford; Princeton University; University of California, Berkeley; Institut d'Études Politiques de Paris

António Costa Pinto (born 1953 in Lisbon, Portugal) is Full Professor at Universidade Lusófona, Portugal. He was formerly a research professor at the Institute of Social Sciences, University of Lisbon, and Professor of Politics and Contemporary European History at ISCTE – Lisbon University Institute, Portugal.

== Career ==
He obtained a BA in history from the Faculty of Letters, University of Lisbon (1982) and holds his doctorate from the European University Institute, Florence (1992). He has been a visiting professor at Stanford University (1993), Georgetown University (2004), a senior associate member at St Antony's College, Oxford (1995), and a senior visiting fellow at Princeton University (1996) and at the University of California, Berkeley (2000 and 2010). From 1999 to 2003 he was a visiting professor at the Institut d'Études Politiques de Paris. He has been an assistant director of the Contemporary Portuguese History Research Centre since its creation in 1998. He was research professor at the Institute of Social Sciences (Lisbon University) He was president of the Portuguese Political Science Association (2006-2010) and his research interests include authoritarianism, political elites, democratization and transitional justice in new democracies, the European Union, and the comparative study of political change in Southern Europe.

== Selected publications ==
- The Oxford Handbook of Portuguese Politics (Oxford: Oxford University Press, 2024) (co-edited).
- Latin American Dictatorships in the Era of Fascism: The Corporatist Wave (London: Routledge, 2020).
- Political Institutions and Democracy in Portugal: Assessing the Impact of the Eurocrisis (Cham: Palgrave Macmillan, 2019).
- Authoritarianism and Corporatism in Europe and Latin America: Crossing Borders (London: Routledge, 2019) (edited with Federico Finchelstein).
- Corporatism and Fascism. The Corporatist Wave in Europe (London: Routledge, 2017).
- The Ends of European Colonial Empires: Cases and Comparisons (Cambridge Imperial and Post-Colonial Studies Series) (Hampshire: Palgrave Macmillan, 2015) (edited with Miguel Bandeira Jerónimo).
- Rethinking Fascism and Dictatorship in Europe (Hampshire: Palgrave Macmillan, 2014) (edited with Aristotle Kallis).
- The Portuguese Republic at One Hundred (Berkeley: Institute of European Studies-UC Berkeley, 2012) (edited with Richard Herr).
- The Nature of Fascism Revisited (New York, NY: SSM-Columbia University Press, 2012).
- The Europeanization of Portuguese Democracy (New York, NY: SSM-Columbia University Press, 2012) (edited with Nuno Severiano Teixeira).
- Dealing with the Legacy of Authoritarianism: The "Politics of the Past" in Southern European Democracies (London: Routledge, 2011) (edited with Leonardo Morlino).
- Rethinking the Nature of Fascism (New York, NY: Palgrave Macmillan, 2011).
- Contemporary Portugal. Politics, society and culture, 2nd Edition (New York, NY: SSM-Columbia University Press, 2011).
- Ruling Elites and Decision-Making in Fascist-Era Dictatorships (New York, NY: SSM-Columbia University Press, 2009).
- Charisma and Fascism in Inter-war Europe (London: Routledge, 2007) (edited with Roger Eatwell and Stein U. Larsen).
- The Last Empire: Thirty Years of Portuguese Decolonisation (Bristol: Intellect, 2003) (edited with Stewart Lloyd-Jones).
- Who Governs Southern Europe? Regime Change and Ministerial Recruitment (London: Routledge, 2003) (edited with Pedro Tavares de Almeida and Nancy Bermeo).
- Southern Europe and the Making of the European Union (New York, NY: SSM-Columbia University Press, 2003) (edited with Nuno Severiano Teixeira).
- The Blue Shirts: Portuguese Fascism in Inter-war Europe (New York, NY: SSM-Columbia University Press, 2000).
- Salazar’s Dictatorship and European Fascism: Problems of Interpretation (New York, NY: SSM-Columbia University Press, 1995).
