= 1935 Portuguese presidential election =

- 17 February 1935
- Turnout: 84.29% (▲14.32pp)
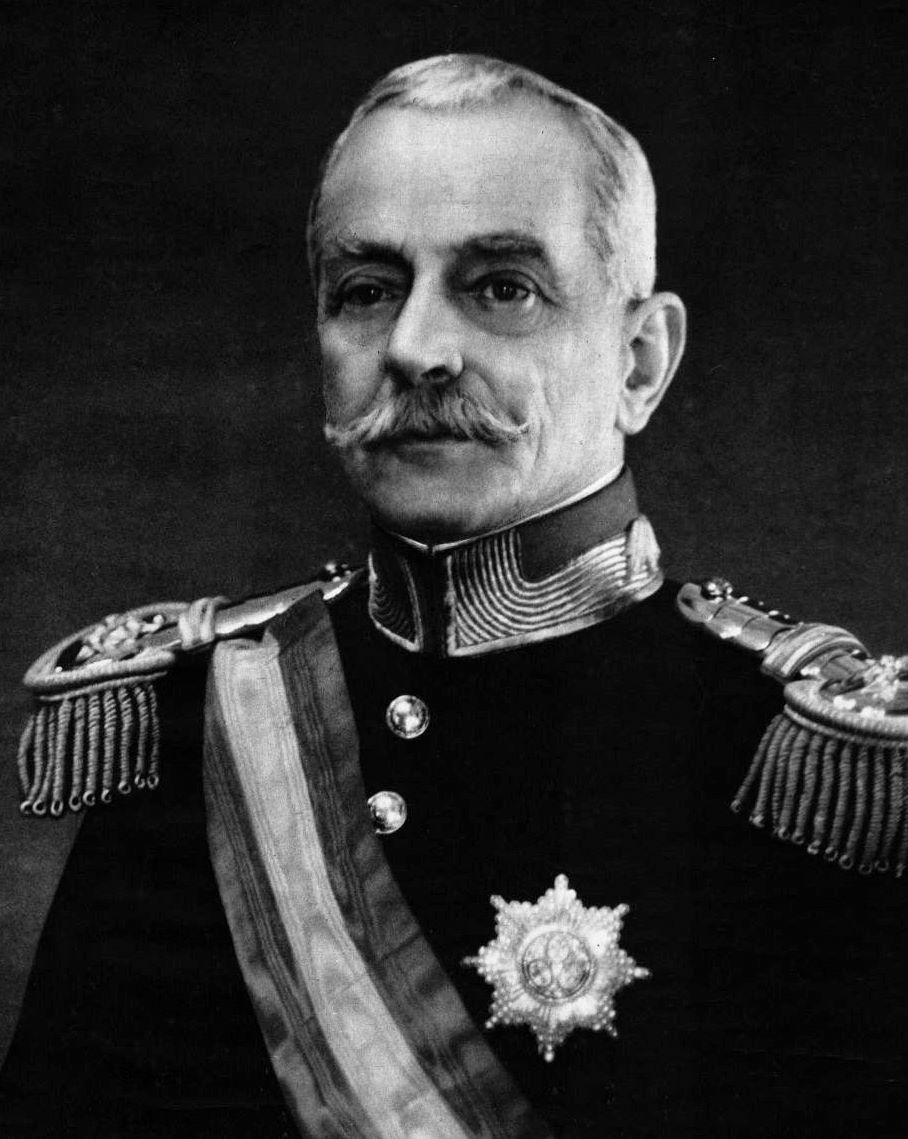
Candidate	Óscar Carmona
Party	UN
Percentage	80%
President before election
Óscar Carmona
UN
Elected President
Óscar Carmona
UN

Presidential elections were held in Portugal on 17 February 1935. Óscar Carmona ran unopposed and was reelected.

== Background ==
In the aftermath of the end of the First Portuguese Republic, Óscar Carmona took power as both president and prime minister in the Ditadura Militar. He was elected as president in the 1928 Portuguese presidential election and later nominated Salazar as Prime Minister in 1932. Carmona largely turned over control of the government to Salazar and ran in the 1935 presidential election with the backing of the sole legal party, the National Union party.

== Electoral system ==
These were the first presidential elections after the Estado Novo was established and the 1933 Constitution of Portugal came into effect. According to the constitution, a president is elected for a period of 7 years and whoever gets the more votes is elected as president. Candidates must be Portuguese citizens, older than 35, in full possession of their civil and political rights, and must have always had Portuguese nationality. Family members of the King of Portugal, up to the 6th degree, could not become presidents.

Voters had to be 21 years or older and, for women they had to have secondary or college education, while, for men, they only had to prove they were able to read, write, and count or had been taxed at least 100 escudos.

== Results ==
Candidate	Votes	%
Óscar Carmona		80
Total		
Total votes	653,754	–
Registered voters/turnout	775,580	84.29
Source: ISCSP, De Almeida
