= Diário da Manhã =

Daily newspaper in Portugal (1931–1971)

- Type: Daily newspaper
- Publisher: Companhia Nacional Editora
- Founded: 4 April 1931
- Ceased publication: 1971
- Political alignment: Right-wing
- Language: Portuguese
- Headquarters: Lisbon
- Country: Portugal

Diário da Manhã (Portuguese: Daily Morning) was a daily newspaper published between 1931 and 1971 in Lisbon, Portugal. It was the official paper of the National Union.

== History and profile ==
Diário da Manhã was first published on 4 April 1931 as an official organ of the National Union, ruling party of Portugal from 1932 to 1974. The paper was published by the Companhia Nacional Editora and was headquartered in Lisbon. Major editors and directors of the paper included Domingos Garcia Pulido, António da Fonseca and Barradas de Oliveira. José María Costa Júnior also worked for Diário da Manhã.

In the early 1971 Diário da Manhã merged with another newspaper entitled A Voz to create Época which was launched on 1 February 1971. The issues of Diário da Manhã were archived at the National Photography Archive, Portugal.

== Political ideology and content ==
Throughout its run Diário da Manhã acted as a mouthpiece of the Salazar regime and was one of its propaganda outlets. The paper adopted an anti-Communist political stance.

In terms of journalism, Diário da Manhã was not impressive. Diário da Manhã's editorials in 1934 attacked the university teachers and other educators serving at different levels arguing that they were left-wing activists, school demagogues and political party agents. It was one of the supporters of the future Spanish ruler Francisco Franco during the Spanish Civil War between 1936 and 1939 and was instrumental in improving his public image. The Hungarian revolution in 1956 was frequently featured in the pages of Diário da Manhã which had a supportive approach towards the anti-Soviet forces led by Imre Nagy.
