= Bráulio (footballer) =

Brazilian footballer (born 1948)

Bráulio Barbosa de Lima (born August 4, 1948 in Porto Alegre) is a Brazilian former footballer who played as a midfielder.

Bráulio appeared in 165 Campeonato Brasileiro matches during his career, playing for Internacional, América (RJ), Botafogo and Coritiba.

== Clubs ==
- Internacional: 1965–1974
- América (RJ): 1974–1976
- Botafogo: 1977–1978
- Coritiba: 1979–1979
- Universidad de Chile: 1980–1981
