= 1949 Portuguese legislative election =

- 13 November 1949

All 120 seats in the National Assembly 61 seats needed for a majority
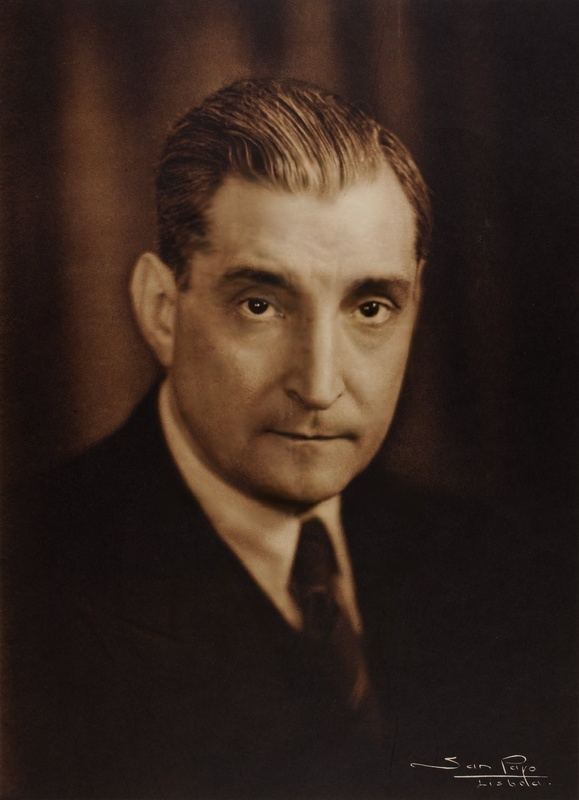
	First party
Leader	António de Oliveira Salazar
Party	UN
Last election	120 seats
Prime Minister before election
António de Oliveira Salazar
UN
Prime Minister after election
António de Oliveira Salazar
UN

Parliamentary elections were held in Portugal on 13 November 1949. Following the late withdrawal of the Democratic Opposition, only eight opposition candidates ran against the ruling National Union.

== Electoral system ==
The elections were held using 21 multi-member constituencies and one single-member constituency covering the Azores, together electing a total of 120 members, 13 of which were from Portuguese colonies.

Voters could delete names from the lists of candidates, but could not replace them. Suffrage was given to all men aged 21 or over as long as they were literate or paid over 100 escudos in taxation, and to women aged over 21 if they had completed secondary education, or if they were the head of a household and met the same literacy and tax criteria as men.

== Campaign ==
The Democratic Opposition withdrew from the election shortly before election day. This left only eight opposition candidates on two lists; a Regionalist list in Castelo Branco including former Prime Minister Francisco Cunha Leal and an Independent Agrarian list in Portalegre including monarchist Pequito Rebelo.

The communist National Democratic Movement and the Youth Movement for Democratic Union both boycotted the election in protest at a lack of free vote.

== Results ==
Party	Votes	%
National Union		
Independent Agrarians		
Regionalists		
Total		
Total votes	927,264	–
Registered voters/turnout	1,223,172	75.81
Source: Nohlen & Stöver
