= 1945 Portuguese legislative election =

- 18 November 1945

All 120 seats in the National Assembly 61 seats needed for a majority
	First party
Leader	António de Oliveira Salazar
Party	UN
Last election	100 seats
Seats won	120
Seat change	▲20
Prime Minister before election
António de Oliveira Salazar
UN
Prime Minister after election
António de Oliveira Salazar
UN

Parliamentary elections were held in Portugal on 18 November 1945. Following reforms introduced by António de Oliveira Salazar, they were the first elections in the Estado Novo to allow opposition parties. The Movement of Democratic Unity was formed by opposition activists, but alongside all opposition candidates, they withdrew from the election before polling day, alleging electoral fraud. As a result, only candidates of the National Union contested the election.

== Electoral system ==
Prior to the elections, the electoral system underwent significant reform. The single 100-member national constituency was replaced by 21 multi-member constituencies and one single-member constituency covering the Azores, together electing a total of 120 members, 13 of which were from Portuguese colonies.

Voters could now delete names from the lists of candidates, but could not replace them. Suffrage was given to all men aged 21 or over as long as they were literate or paid over 100 escudos in taxation, and to women aged over 21 if they had completed secondary education, or, in an extension to the rules, if they were the head of a household and met the same literacy and tax criteria as men.

== Results ==
Party	Votes	%	Seats
National Union			120
Total			120
Total votes	489,133	–	
Registered voters/turnout	909,456	53.78	
Source: Nohlen & Stöver

== See also ==
- Politics of Portugal
- List of political parties in Portugal
- Elections in Portugal
