= 1953 Portuguese legislative election =

- 8 November 1953

All 120 seats in the National Assembly 61 seats needed for a majority
	First party
Leader	António de Oliveira Salazar
Party	UN
Seats won	120
Prime Minister before election
António de Oliveira Salazar
UN
Prime Minister after election
António de Oliveira Salazar
UN

Parliamentary elections were held in Portugal on 8 November 1953. The ruling National Union won all 120 seats.

== Electoral system ==
The elections were held using 21 multi-member constituencies and one single-member constituency covering the Azores, together electing a total of 120 members, 13 of which were from Portuguese colonies.

Voters could delete names from the lists of candidates, but could not replace them. Suffrage was given to all men aged 21 or over as long as they were literate or paid over 100 escudos in taxation, and to women aged over 21 if they had completed secondary education, or if they were the head of a household and met the same literacy and tax criteria as men.

== Campaign ==
The opposition to the Estado Novo, consisting of anti-communist liberals, republicans and intellectuals, presented three lists with a total of 28 candidates in Lisbon, Porto and Aveiro. The elections were boycotted by the National Democratic Movement and the Youth Movement for Democratic Union in protest at a lack of freedom, whilst monarchists boycotted the elections except in cases where a National Union candidate was a known royalist.

== Results ==
Party	Votes	%	Seats
National Union			120
Opposition lists			0
Total			120
Total votes	845,281	–	
Registered voters/turnout	1,239,504	68.20	
Source: Nohlen & Stöver

== See also ==
- Politics of Portugal
- List of political parties in Portugal
- Elections in Portugal
