= Manuel Rodrigues (footballer, born 1942) =

Portuguese footballer

Personal information
- Full name: Manuel de Sousa Rodrigues
- Date of birth: 29 December 1942 (age 83)
- Place of birth: Portugal
- Position: Defender

Senior career*
Years	Team	Apps	(Gls)
- Belenenses

International career
1967	Portugal	3	(0)
- * Club domestic league appearances and goals

Manuel de Sousa Rodrigues (born 29 December 1942) is a former Portuguese footballer who played as a defender.

== See also ==
- Football in Portugal
