= 1928 Portuguese presidential election =

- 25 March 1928
- Turnout: 69.97%
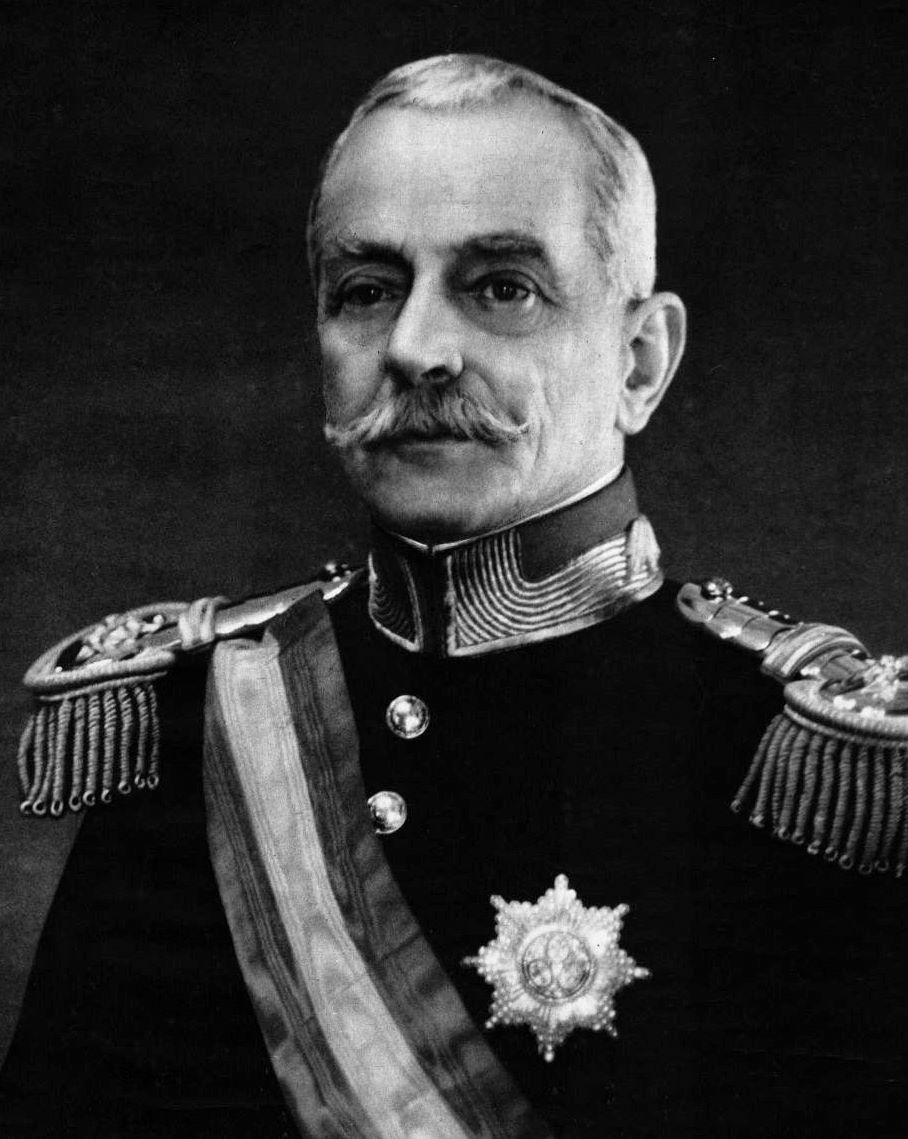
Candidate	Óscar Carmona
Party	Independent
Popular vote	761,730
Percentage	100%
President before election
Óscar Carmona
Independent
Elected President
Óscar Carmona
Independent

Presidential elections were held in Portugal on 25 March 1928. Óscar Carmona ran unopposed.

== Results ==
Candidate	Votes	%
Óscar Carmona	761,730	100.00
Total	761,730	100.00
Valid votes	761,730	99.64
Invalid/blank votes	2,753	0.36
Total votes	764,483	100.00
Registered voters/turnout	1,092,591	69.97
Source: ISCSP, De Almeida
