= 1949 Portuguese presidential election =

- 13 February 1949
- Turnout: 77.61% (▼13.51pp)
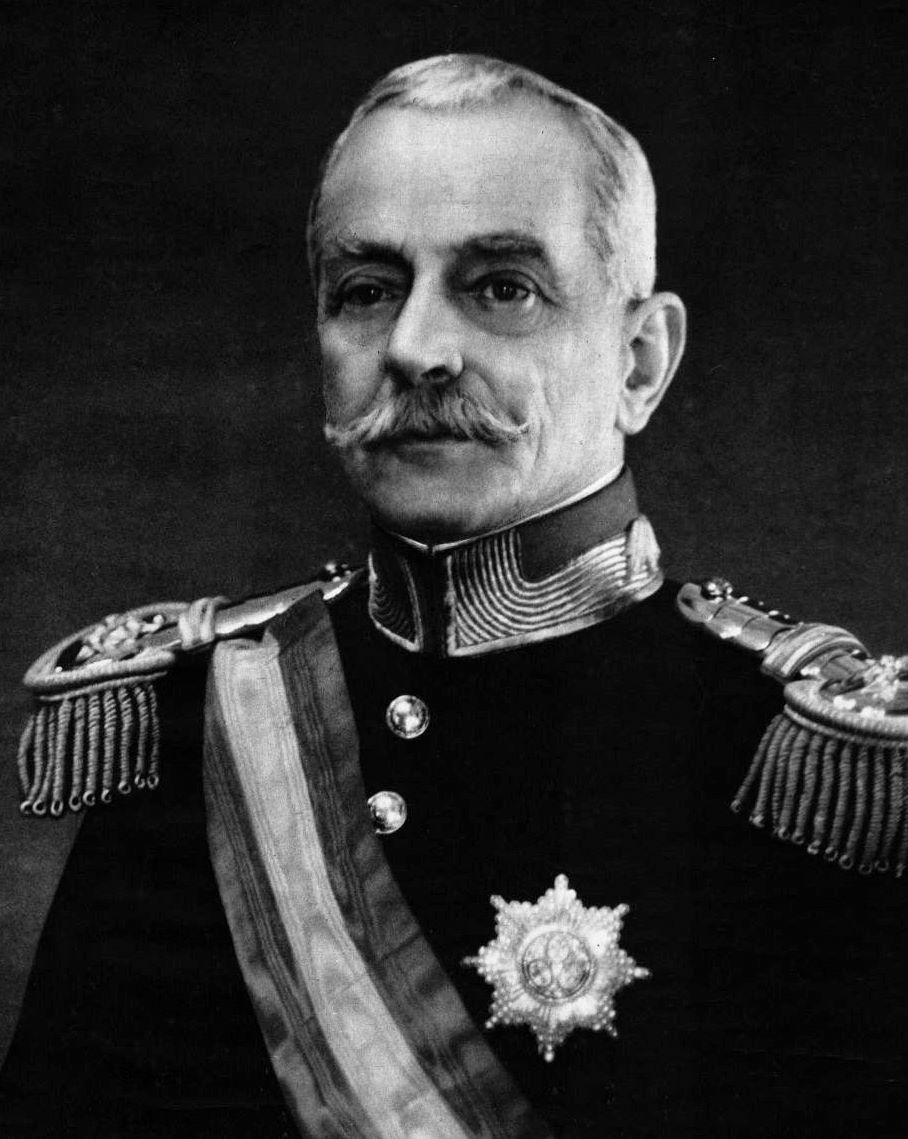

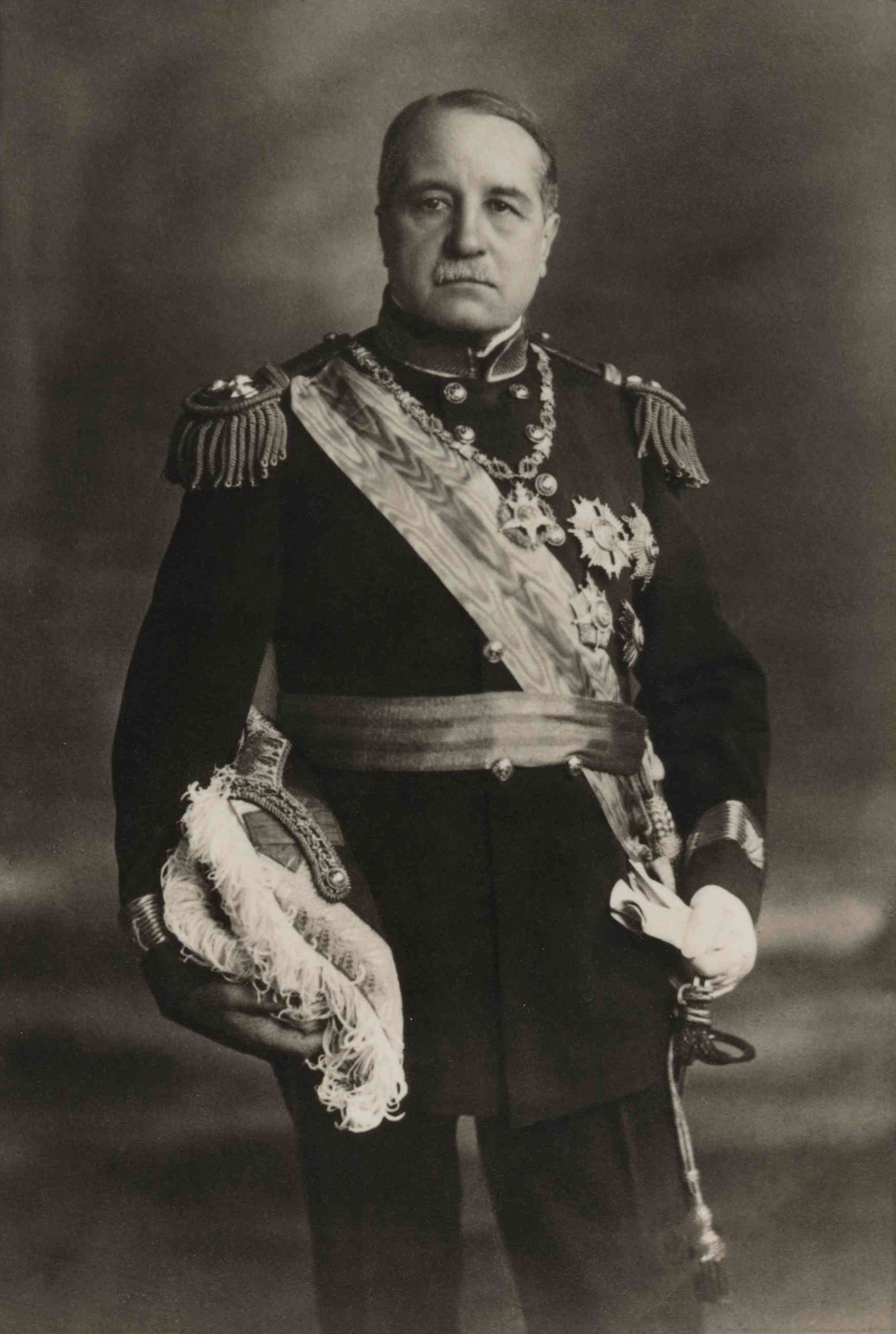
Candidate	Óscar Carmona	Norton de Matos
Party	UN	Independent
Popular vote		Withdrew
President before election
Óscar Carmona
UN
Elected President
Óscar Carmona
UN

Presidential elections were held in Portugal on 13 February 1949. Initially, incumbent president Óscar Carmona was due to face an opponent in General José Norton de Matos. However, the Salazar government subjected Norton de Matos and his followers to severe persecution. The intimidation progressed to the point that Norton de Matos pulled out of the contest just before election day. As a result, Carmona was reelected unopposed for a fourth consecutive term.

== Electoral system ==
According to the 1933 Constitution of Portugal, a president is elected for a period of 7 years and whoever gets the more votes is elected as president. Candidates must be Portuguese citizens, older than 35, in full possession of their civil and political rights, and must have always had Portuguese nationality. Family members of the King of Portugal, up to the 6th degree, could not become presidents.

Voters had to be 21 years or older and, for women they had to a) have secondary education or equivalent or b) be household heads, while, for men, they either a) had to prove they were able to read, write, and count or b) had been taxed at least 100 escudos.

== Campaign ==
The campaign started officially on 1 January 1949. Norton de Mato's campaign was supported by grassroots donations through a "um escudo para a candidatura" (one escudo for the campaign) which allowed a vast campaign with pamphlets, posters, rallies with fireworks, etc. The UN's campaign in support of Carmona was focused on highlighting the fact that Matos was a Freemason and had the support of the Portuguese Communist Party, as well as trying to portray him as anti-Christianity. Still, de Matos' rallies were well-attended, including one with 100,000 people in Porto.

== Results ==
Candidate	Votes	%
Óscar Carmona		
José Norton de Matos (withdrew)		
Total		
Total votes	875,598	–
Registered voters/turnout	1,128,198	77.61
Source: ISCSP, De Almeida

== External sites ==
- Casa Comum - Photographs of Norton de Matos' campaign
- Ephemera - Documentation (pamphlets, posters) of Norton de Matos' campaign
