= National Union (Portugal) =

Former ruling party of Portugal (1932–1974)

National Union União Nacional
- Logo used until the 1960s
- Other name: Ação Nacional Popular (Note: From February 1970 to April 1974)
- Founded: 30 July 1930; 96 years ago
- Dissolved: 25 April 1974; 52 years ago
- Newspaper: Diário da Manhã
- Membership: approx. 20,000 (1933 est.)
- Ideology: Salazarism; Ultranationalism; Authoritarian conservatism; Pluricontinentalism; Corporate statism
- Political position: Right-wing to far-right
- Religion: Roman Catholicism
- Colours: Blue Green

Party flag

The National Union (Portuguese: União Nacional, UN) was the sole legal party of the Estado Novo regime in Portugal, founded in July 1930 and dominated by António de Oliveira Salazar during most of its existence. Unlike most single-party regimes, the National Union was more of a political arm of the government than a body with actual power over it. The National Union membership was mostly drawn from local notables: landowners, professionals, businessmen, Catholics, monarchists, or conservative republicans. The National Union was never a militant or very active organization.

Once Salazar assumed the premiership, the National Union became the only party legally allowed to function under the Estado Novo. Salazar announced that the National Union would be the antithesis of a political party. The NU became an ancillary body, not a source of political power. At no stage did it appear that Salazar wished it to fulfill the central role the fascist party had acquired in Mussolini's Italy; in fact, it was meant to be a platform of conservatism, not a revolutionary vanguard.

The National Union's ideology was corporatism, and it drew inspiration from Catholic encyclicals such as Rerum novarum and Quadragesimo anno as well as from Mussolini's corporate state. Unlike fascist parties, the National Union played no role in the government: it only served as a tool for the selection of National Assembly deputies, as well as a way to provide some legitimacy to non-competitive elections that Salazar's regime regularly held. The National Union was set up to control and restrain public opinion rather than to mobilize it, and ministers, diplomats and civil servants were never compelled to join the party.

According to António Costa Pinto, the National Union was a moribund party, created by a governmental decree rather than by political activists, and which was "dominated by the administration, put to sleep and reawakened in accordance with the situation at the time". He describes the party as "an empty, undermined space into which were formally sent those who wanted to join the regime and which, once full, was closed". Pinto notes that the army was kept away from public life, and political activity was prohibited outside public life. This included the National Union, which lacked any kind of political activism.

Therefore, the party lacked an ideology and did not mobilize the masses. Pinto argues that the opposite was the case: "in fact demotivation was openly encouraged." He concludes that the party had a "non-fascist nature" and argues that it "neither reached power at all nor, once created, fulfilled functions of control and monopoly of access to power or mobilization of the masses, which, in general, the fascists did."

Scholarly opinion varies on whether the Estado Novo and the National Union should be considered fascist. Salazar himself criticized the "exaltation of youth, the cult of force through direct action, the principle of the superiority of state political power in social life, [and] the propensity for organizing masses behind a single leader" as fundamental differences between fascism and the Catholic corporatism of the Estado Novo. Scholars such as Stanley G. Payne, Thomas Gerard Gallagher, Juan José Linz, António Costa Pinto, Roger Griffin, Grzegorz Rossoliński-Liebe and Arnd Bauerkämper, as well as Howard J. Wiarda, consider the Portuguese Estado Novo conservative authoritarian and not fascist. In his The Anatomy of Fascism, Robert Paxton express the same view, writing that Salazar's regime was "not only nonfascist, but voluntarily nontotalitarian". On the other hand, Portuguese scholars like Fernando Rosas, Manuel Villaverde Cabral, Manuel de Lucena, Manuel Loff and Raquel Varela think that the Estado Novo should be considered fascist.

== Ideology ==
Salazar's political philosophy formed the ideological foundation of the Estado Novo and, by extension, defined the National Union's institutional role as a supporting organ rather than an autonomous ideological movement. Deeply influenced by Catholic social doctrine, particularly the papal encyclicals Rerum novarum (1891) and Quadragesimo anno (1931), Salazar advocated a corporatist and hierarchical social order intended to harmonize relations between social groups while avoiding class conflict. This system rejected both liberal capitalism and socialism, instead promoting cooperation between occupational and social bodies within a unified national framework.

Central to this worldview was the concept of integral nationalism, influenced by Portuguese integralist thought and the ideas of French thinker, Charles Maurras, which emphasized national unity, hierarchy, tradition, and opposition to liberal democracy. The regime rejected liberal parliamentarism, political pluralism, and socialism, advocating instead an organic conception of society in which individuals were represented through corporative institutions rather than political parties. These principles reflected broader intellectual influences from movements such as Integralismo Lusitano, which combined nationalism, traditionalism, monarchism, and anti-liberalism.

The corporatist constitution of 1933 institutionalized these ideological principles, establishing the Estado Novo as an authoritarian, anti-parliamentarian regime based on representation through functional social groups rather than electoral competition. The corporatist system sought to integrate workers, employers, and professional organizations into state-supervised bodies that regulated economic and social relations while subordinating independent political activity to state authority. Although corporatism was presented as a mechanism for social harmony, political power remained concentrated in the executive leadership.

Catholicism played a central role in shaping the regime's political culture and institutional framework, and the Estado Novo is widely described as authoritarian and conservative in character. The regime's close alignment with Catholic social thought and moral principles has sometimes been described as a form of National Catholicism, although it maintained formal separation between church and state. Salazar's ideological outlook emphasized social order, discipline, and national unity, rejecting revolutionary transformation and mass political mobilization. From the 1950s onward, official ideology increasingly incorporated the concepts of Lusotropicalism and pluricontinentalism, which were used to justify Portugal's retention of its overseas empire and to portray Portuguese colonialism as uniquely integrative and multiracial. These ideas reinforced the regime's emphasis on national unity across its metropolitan and colonial territories.

While the Estado Novo shared certain structural similarities with other authoritarian and corporatist regimes, including close cooperation with Catholic institutions and the rejection of liberal democracy, its ideological character remains the subject of scholarly debate. Some historians have noted parallels with clerical fascism due to its authoritarianism, corporatism, and nationalist orientation, while others emphasize its conservative, traditionalist, and non-revolutionary character.

Within this ideological framework, the National Union functioned primarily as an administrative and political instrument designed to support and legitimize the regime rather than to formulate doctrine or mobilize mass participation. It reflected the broader ideological principles of integral nationalism, corporatism, and authoritarian conservatism while serving to coordinate political representation within the controlled institutional structure of the Estado Novo. As noted by historian António Costa Pinto, the National Union lacked independent political initiative and functioned principally as an extension of state authority rather than an autonomous ideological organization.

=== Secularism ===
The Estado Novo maintained cooperative relations with the Catholic Church while formally preserving the principle of secularism established during the republican period. In 1940, the regime signed a concordat with the Holy See, which normalized relations after decades of tension and granted the Church institutional protections and recognition. However, the concordat did not establish Catholicism as the official religion nor did it overturn the constitutional separation of church and state. Salazar himself supported maintaining the formal legal distinction between religious and political authority, consistent with the Portuguese constitution. Historians have noted that although the regime closely cooperated with the Church and incorporated Catholic social values into its ideology, it never officially reversed the republic's secular framework. This arrangement reflected a pragmatic relationship in which the regime benefited from the Church's moral legitimacy while retaining ultimate political authority and preserving the legal structure of a secular state.

== History ==
The party was founded in 1930 during the Ditadura Nacional period. Officially, it was not a political party but an "organization of unity of all the Portuguese". Salazar in the speech that launched the party, was vague in terms of its role, and he incorporated all the parties supporting the dictatorship, whether republican, monarchic or Catholic. Its first organic principles expressly declared that "all citizens, regardless of their political or religious beliefs," would be admitted as long as they adhered to the principles of Salazar's speech of 30 June 1930.

The National Union was established as a subordinate umbrella organization to support the regime. It was the only party legally allowed under the Estado Novo regime; all other political parties were banned and persecuted, including the National Syndicalists, led by Francisco Rolão Preto, who were originally supporters. In 1934, Salazar arrested and exiled Francisco Rolão Preto as a part of a purge of the leadership of the Portuguese National Syndicalists. The Portuguese National Syndicalists broke into factions, some going into exile while the majority ended up joining the National Union. Salazar denounced the National Syndicalists as "inspired by certain foreign models" (meaning German Nazism) and condemned their "exaltation of youth, the cult of force through direct action, the principle of the superiority of state political power in social life, [and] the propensity for organizing masses behind a single leader" as fundamental differences between fascism and the Catholic corporatism of the Estado Novo.

The first leader of the National Union was the Interior Minister Colonel Lopes Mateus. The composition of the Central Commission indicated that the party was meant to support the regime rather than militate for it. Salazar became president, and Albino dos Reis, a former member of the Cunha Leal ULR, was nominated Vice President. The first Central Commission was composed by Bissaia Barreto, João Amaral, a judge and an integralist monarchist, and Nuno Mexia, who had been linked to the Union of Economic Interests (União dos Interesses Económicos) in the 1920s. Appointment to lead the party meant either "retirement" or a prestigious pause from government duties. The absence of youth was a characteristic of the National Union, particularly in the 1930s. At the first Congress, 68% of the delegates were over 40 years old.

According to historian António Costa Pinto, the National Union is an example of extreme weakness among dictatorships with single-party rule. There was no internal party activity until 1933. From 1934 onwards, after the creation of the regime's new institutions, the National Union embarked on a period of lethargy from which it did not emerge until 1944. This lethargy can be partly explained by the regime's affirmation that it accorded it little importance beyond its utility as an electoral and legitimizing vehicle.

Lawrence S. Graham and Harry M. Makler wrote that the party "scarcely existed", and added: "This single party appeared to be absent in national life. Filled with prominent people, it did not include the masses, and it showed itself only transiently during electoral periods." Graham and Makler also argue that this points to "the absence of a true fascist movement" in Portugal, noting the weak, amorphous and disorganized character of the National Union, unable to organise youth organizations and militias present in fascist movements.

The Estado Novo also created state bodies for propaganda, youth and labour, but they were not connected with the party. In 1931, the official newspaper of the National Union, Diário da Manhã. Its first issue was published on 4 April 1931. Using Diário da Manhã, the National Union called for national unity and cooperation, arguing that the "foreign institutional system" of the First Portuguese Republic "had proved to be incompatible with the necessities, interests, qualities and even flaws of the Portuguese nation". It contrasted the supposed stability of the Estado Novo, as opposed to the pre-1926 republican government which "transformed the country‟s public life into something like a tribal African disorder".

In 1938 Salazar recognized that National Union's activities "were successively diminished until they had almost been extinguished". With World War II's end, the National Union came to life again. In October 1945, Salazar announced a liberalization program designed to restore civil rights that had been suppressed during the Spanish Civil War and World War II in hopes of improving the image of his regime in Western circles. The measures included parliamentary elections, a general political amnesty, restoration of freedom of the press, curtailment of legal repression and a commitment to introduce the right of habeas corpus. The opposition to Salazar started to organize itself around a broad coalition, the Movement of Democratic Unity (MUD), which ranged from ultra-Catholics and fringe elements of the extreme right to the Portuguese Communist Party. Initially, the moderate opposition controlled the MUD, but it soon became strongly influenced by the Communist Party, which controlled its youth wing. In the leadership were several communists, among them Octávio Pato, Salgado Zenha, Mário Soares, Júlio Pomar and Mário Sacramento.

Logo of the People's National Action, in use from 1970

The opposition Movement of Democratic Unity was legal between 1945 and 1948, but even then, the political system was so heavily rigged that it had no realistic chance of winning.

The party won all seats in elections to the National Assembly of Portugal from 1934 to 1973. Opposition candidates were nominally allowed after 1945 but prematurely withdrew in the 1945 and 1973 legislative elections. In 1970, two years after Salazar had been replaced as a leader and prime minister by Marcelo Caetano, the name of the party was changed to Acção Nacional Popular ("People's National Action"). Subsequent to Salazar's retirement, the party faced formal competition in the 1969 legislative election. However, the conduct of this election was little different from past contests, with the ANP winning all constituencies in a landslide.

Under Caetano, the party and the regime further softened its rule; the police is reported to "have become more respectful of legality [...] and would spare systematically moderate opponents", and the People's National Action proclaimed that it would move "toward a degree of pluralism". Censorship was softened, political debates occurred, while strikes and demonstrations came to be tolerated. Caetano also permitted the formation of a non-state labor movement, the General Confederation of the Portuguese Workers. Compared to Salazar, Caetano presided over "a far more open, more pluralist, more socially just system".

The most important ideological change that Caetano implemented was reforming Salazar's syndicalism: in 1969, Caetano gave the state syndicates a right to elect their own leadership without government approval. Graham and Makler wrote that this reform proved revolutionary: "Within months the sindicatos, which for decades had been trade unions in name only, began to be transformed from amorphous government agencies into genuine instruments of the workers. For the first time opposition elements, including Communists in the case of some sindicatos, swept the union elections, and the elections were allowed to stand." Wage disputes were also reformed, and the workers' syndicates would not select their own representatives in the disputes, granting independent bargaining power. Caetano also introduced a vast range of new social programs, and ensured their enforcement.

Caetano has been described as a "frustrated liberal" who was willing to but unable to implement the process of democratization, and who was thwarted in his reforms by the salazarista forces. Ultimately, he was unable to move forward with his reforms, and he came to preside over "liberalization without democratization". The political gridlock that Caetano encountered, together with the colonial wars, growing factionalism and the growth of independent labor movement, resulted in "the total incapacity of the Caetano regime to find a political solution."

The party had no real philosophy apart from support for the regime. The National Syndicalist leader, Francisco Rolão Preto criticized the National Union in 1945 as a "grouping of moderates of all parties, bourgeois without soul or faith in the national and revolutionary imperatives of our time".

As a result of its lack of ideology, it disappeared in short order after the Portuguese Revolution of 1974. It has never been revived, and no party claiming to be its heir has won any seats in the Assembly of the Republic in modern Portugal.

== Presidents ==
No.	Portrait	Name (Birth–Death)	Term			Political party
No.	Portrait	Name (Birth–Death)	Took office	Left office	Time in office	Political party
1	António de Oliveira Salazar	António de Oliveira Salazar (1889–1970)	30 July 1930	27 September 1968	38 years, 59 days	UN
2	Marcelo Caetano	Marcelo Caetano (1906–1980)	27 September 1968	25 April 1974	5 years, 210 days	ANP

== Electoral history ==
=== Presidential elections ===
Election	Party candidate	Popular vote	%	Result
President elected by popular vote
1928	Óscar Carmona	761,730	100%	Elected ✓
1935	Óscar Carmona	653,754	100%	Elected ✓
1942	Óscar Carmona	829,042	100%	Elected ✓
1949	Óscar Carmona	761,730	100%	Elected ✓
1951	Francisco Craveiro Lopes	761,730	100%	Elected ✓
1958	Américo Tomás	765,081	76.42%	Elected ✓
President elected by National Assembly
1965	Américo Tomás	556	97.7%	Elected ✓
1972	Américo Tomás	616	92.1%	Elected ✓

=== National Assembly elections ===
Election	Party leader	Popular vote	%	Seats won	+/–	Position	Result
1934	António Salazar	476,706	100%	100 / 100	▲100	▲1st	Sole legal party
1938	António Salazar	694,290	100%	100 / 100	Steady	1st	Sole legal party
1942	António Salazar	758,215	100%	100 / 100	Steady	1st	Sole legal party
1945	António Salazar	489,133	100%	120 / 120	▲20	1st	Supermajority government
1949	António Salazar	927,264	100%	120 / 120	Steady	1st	Supermajority government
1953	António Salazar	845,281	100%	120 / 120	Steady	1st	Supermajority government
1957	António Salazar	911,618	100%	120 / 120	Steady	1st	Supermajority government
1961	António Salazar	973,997	100%	130 / 130	▲10	1st	Supermajority government
1965	António Salazar	998,542	100%	130 / 130	Steady	1st	Supermajority government
1969	Marcelo Caetano	981,263	87.99%	130 / 130	Steady	1st	Supermajority government
1973	Marcelo Caetano	1,393,294	100%	150 / 150	▲20	1st	Supermajority government

== Sources ==
- Derrick, Michael; R.J. Stove (1938). The Portugal of Salazar. New York: Campion Books, Ltd. online free
- Egerton, F. Clement C. (1943). Salazar, Rebuilder of Portugal. London: Hodder & Stoughton.
- Gallagher, Tom (1983). Portugal: A Twentieth-century Interpretation. Manchester University Press. pp. 60, 99. ISBN 978-0719008764.
- Gallagher, Tom (1990). "Chapter 9: Conservatism, dictatorship and fascism in Portugal, 1914–45". In Blinkhorn, Martin (ed.). Fascists and Conservatives. Routledge. pp. 157–173. ISBN 004940086X.
- Gallagher, Tom (2020). Salazar : the dictator who refused to die. C Hurst & Co Publishers Ltd. ISBN 9781787383883.
- Graham, Lawrence S.; Makler, Harry M. (1979). Contemporary Portugal: The Revolution and Its Antecedents. Austin and London: University of Texas Press. ISBN 0-292-71047-X.
- Kay, Hugh (1970). Salazar and Modern Portugal. New York: Hawthorn Books.
- Costa Pinto, António (2000). The Blue Shirts - Portuguese Fascists and the New State (PDF). Social Science Monographs, Boulder - Distributed by Columbia University Press, NY. ISBN 088033-9829.
- Costa Pinto, António (2010). Ruling Elites and Decision-Making in Fascist-Era Dictatorships. Social Science Monographs, Boulder - Distributed by Columbia University Press, NY. ISBN 978-0880336567.
- Lewis, Paul H (30 December 2002). Latin fascist elites : the Mussolini, Franco, and Salazar regimes. Praeger. p. 187. ISBN 978-0275978808.
- Wiarda, Howard J. (1977). Corporatism and Development: The Portuguese Experience (First ed.). Univ of Massachusetts Press. ISBN 978-0870232213.
- Wiarda, Howard J.; Mott, Margaret MacLeish (2001). Catholic Roots and Democratic Flowers: Political Systems in Spain and Portugal. Westport, CT: Greenwood Publishing Group. p. 49.
