= 1879 in Portugal =

- Centuries: 17th; 18th; 19th; 20th; 21st
- Decades: 1850s; 1860s; 1870s; 1880s; 1890s
- See also: List of years in Portugal

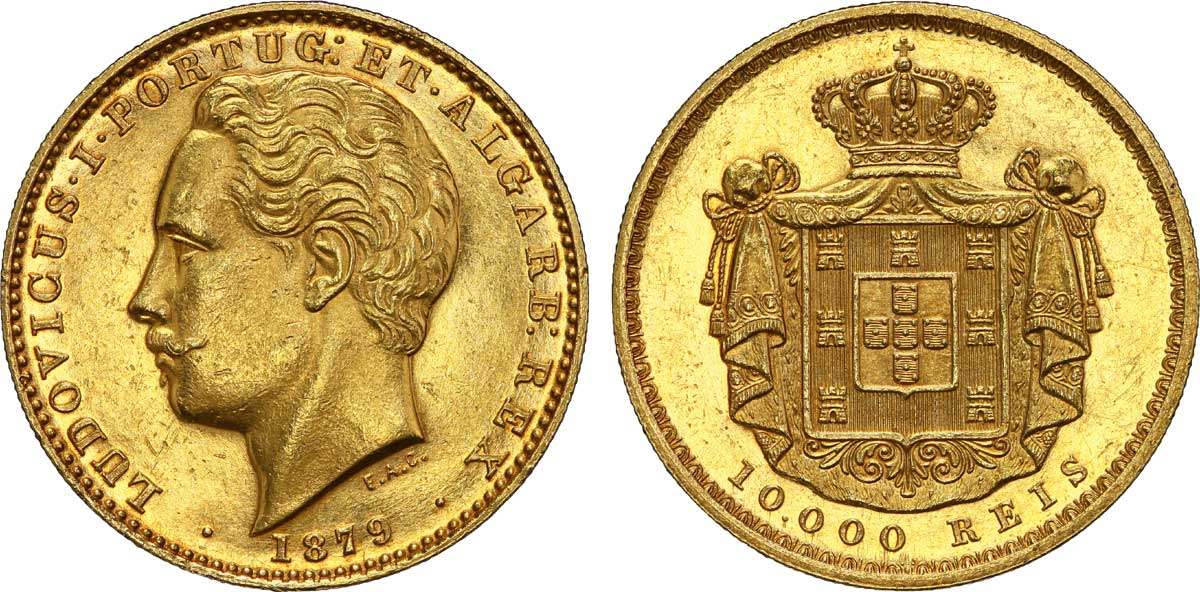

Events in the year 1879 in Portugal.

== Incumbents ==
- Monarch: Luís I
- President of the Council of Ministers: Fontes Pereira de Melo (until 1 June), Anselmo José Braamcamp (from 1 June)

== Events ==
- 19 October - Legislative election

== Births ==
- 21 November - Raul Lino, architect (died 1974)
- 30 December - Manuel Gourlade, football manager (died 1908)
- António Correia de Oliveira, poet (died 1960)

== Deaths ==
- 20 February - Joaquim Heliodoró da Cunha Rivara, physician, professor, intellectual, politician (born 1809)
- Eugênia Câmara, actress (born 1837)

== See also ==
- List of colonial governors in 1879#Portugal
