= 1875 in Portugal =

- Decades: 1850s; 1860s; 1870s; 1880s; 1890s
- See also: History of Portugal; Timeline of Portuguese history; List of years in Portugal

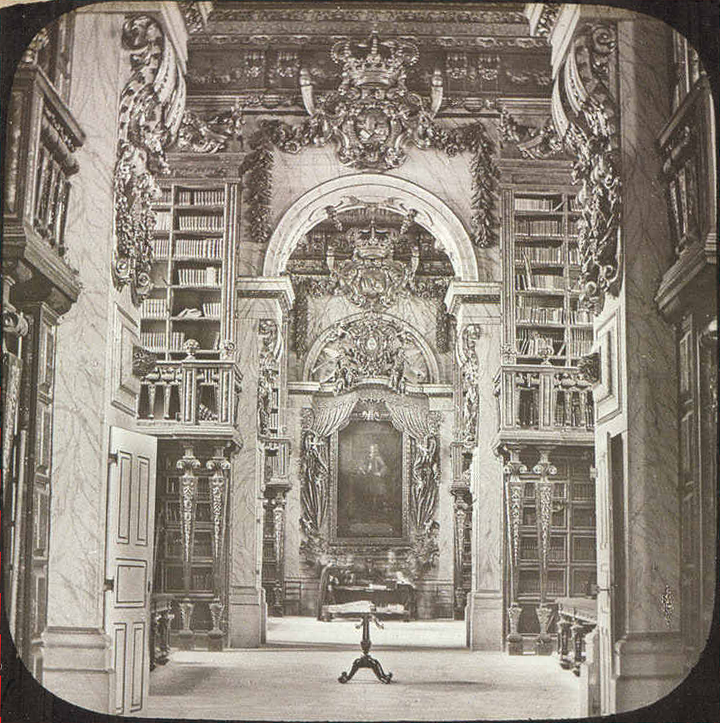
The Biblioteca Joanina, sometimes known in English as the Joanine Library, at the University of Coimbra, Portugal, as it appeared in 1875.

Events in the year 1875 in Portugal. There were 455,000 registered voters in the country.

== Incumbents ==
- King: Luís I
- President of the Council of Ministers: Fontes Pereira de Melo

== Events ==
- Creation of the Lisbon Geographic Society.
- Creation of the Portuguese Socialist Party.
- First football match in the country.
- Publication of O Crime do Padre Amaro, by José Maria de Eça de Queirós.
- Rafael Bordalo Pinheiro creates the Zé Povinho character.

== Deaths ==
- José Alberto dos Reis, jurist (died 1955)
- José António Duro, poet (died 1899)

== Births ==
- 22 May - Nuno José Severo de Mendoça Rolim de Moura Barreto, 1st Duke of Loulé, politician (born 1804)
- 18 June - António Feliciano de Castilho, writer, poet (born 1800)
- Infante Sebastian of Portugal and Spain, infante (born 1811 in Brazil)

== See also ==
- List of colonial governors in 1875 § Portugal
