= 1878 in Portugal =

- Centuries: 17th; 18th; 19th; 20th; 21st
- Decades: 1850s; 1860s; 1870s; 1880s; 1890s
- See also: List of years in Portugal

Events in the year 1878 in Portugal.

== Incumbents ==
- Monarch: Louis I
- Prime Minister: António José de Ávila, 1st Duke of Ávila and Bolama (until 26 January); Fontes Pereira de Melo (starting 26 January)

== Events ==
- 13 October – Portuguese legislative election, 1878

== Births ==
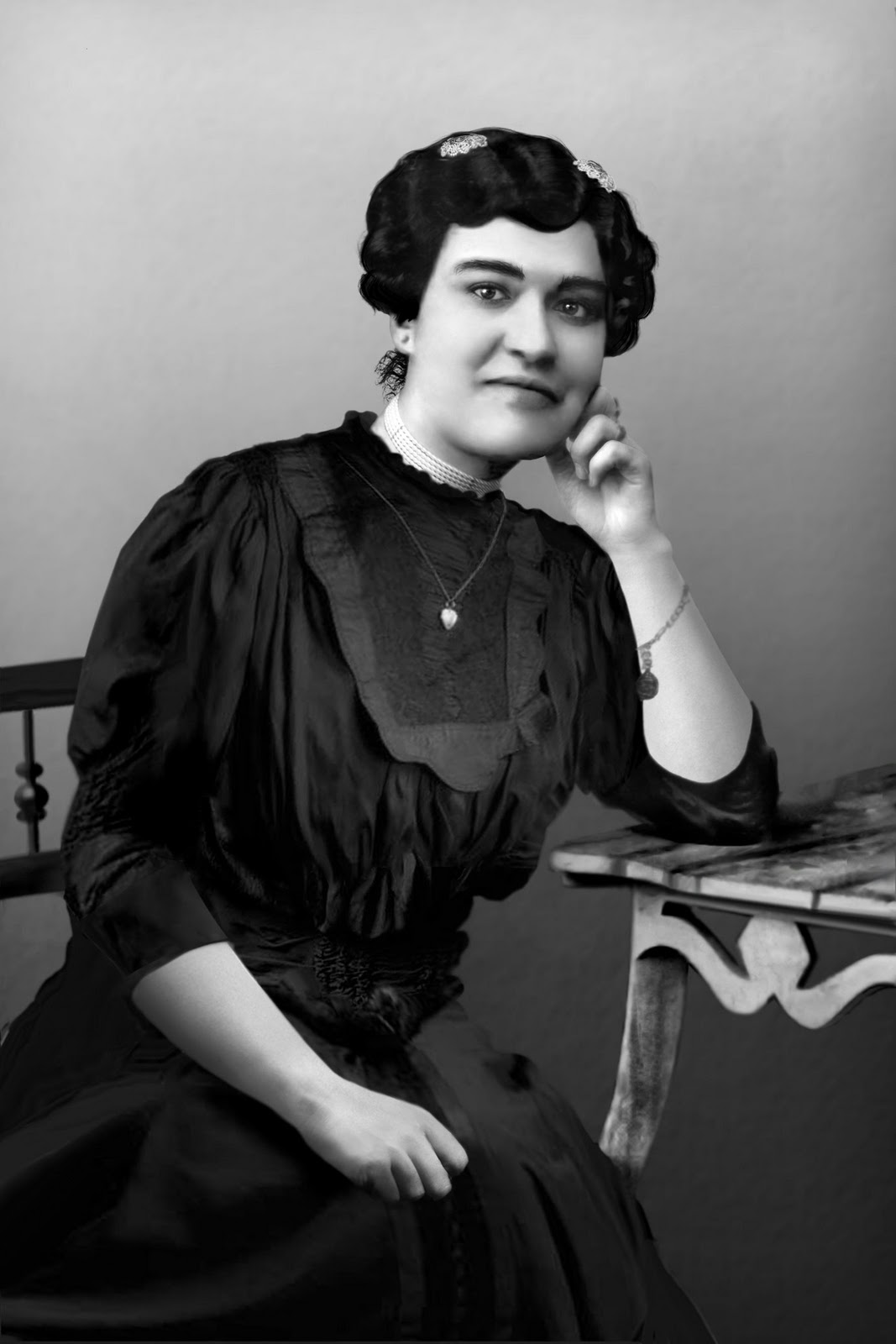
Carolina Beatriz Ângelo

- 6 April – Carolina Beatriz Ângelo, physician (died 1911)
- 8 October – Walther Katzenstein, sports rower (died 1929).
- 9 November – Álvaro de Castro, politician (died 1928)

== Deaths ==
- 6 October – Daniel da Silva, mathematician (born 1814)
