= 1877 in Portugal =

- Centuries: 17th; 18th; 19th; 20th; 21st
- Decades: 1850s; 1860s; 1870s; 1880s; 1890s
- See also: List of years in Portugal

Events in the year 1877 in Portugal.

== Incumbents ==
- Monarch: Luís I
- President of the Council of Ministers: Fontes Pereira de Melo (until 5 March), António José de Ávila (from 5 March)

== Events ==
- 4 November - Inauguration of the Maria Pia Bridge, in Porto.
- Opening of the Campanhã railway station, in Porto.

== Births ==
- 2 November - Teixeira de Pascoaes, poet (died 1952)

== Deaths ==
- 13 September - Alexandre Herculano, novelist, historian (born 1810)

== See also ==
- List of colonial governors in 1877#Portugal
