= 1876 in Portugal =

- Centuries: 17th; 18th; 19th; 20th; 21st
- Decades: 1850s; 1860s; 1870s; 1880s; 1890s
- See also: List of years in Portugal

Events in the year 1876 in Portugal.

== Incumbents ==
- Monarch: Louis I
- Prime Minister: Fontes Pereira de Melo

== Events ==
- 1–7 May – Edward, Prince of Wales visits Lisbon on the final leg of an eight-month international tour.
- 11 October – The first edition of the Diário de Notícias da Madeira newspaper is published.
- 7 December – After weeks of heavy precipitation the Guadiana and Tagus rivers in southeastern Portugal burst their banks, destroying several villages in one of the worst flooding events in recorded in the country as well as the biggest involving Guadiana and Tagus rivers.

== Sports ==
- Associação Académica de Coimbra – O.A.F. founded

== Births ==
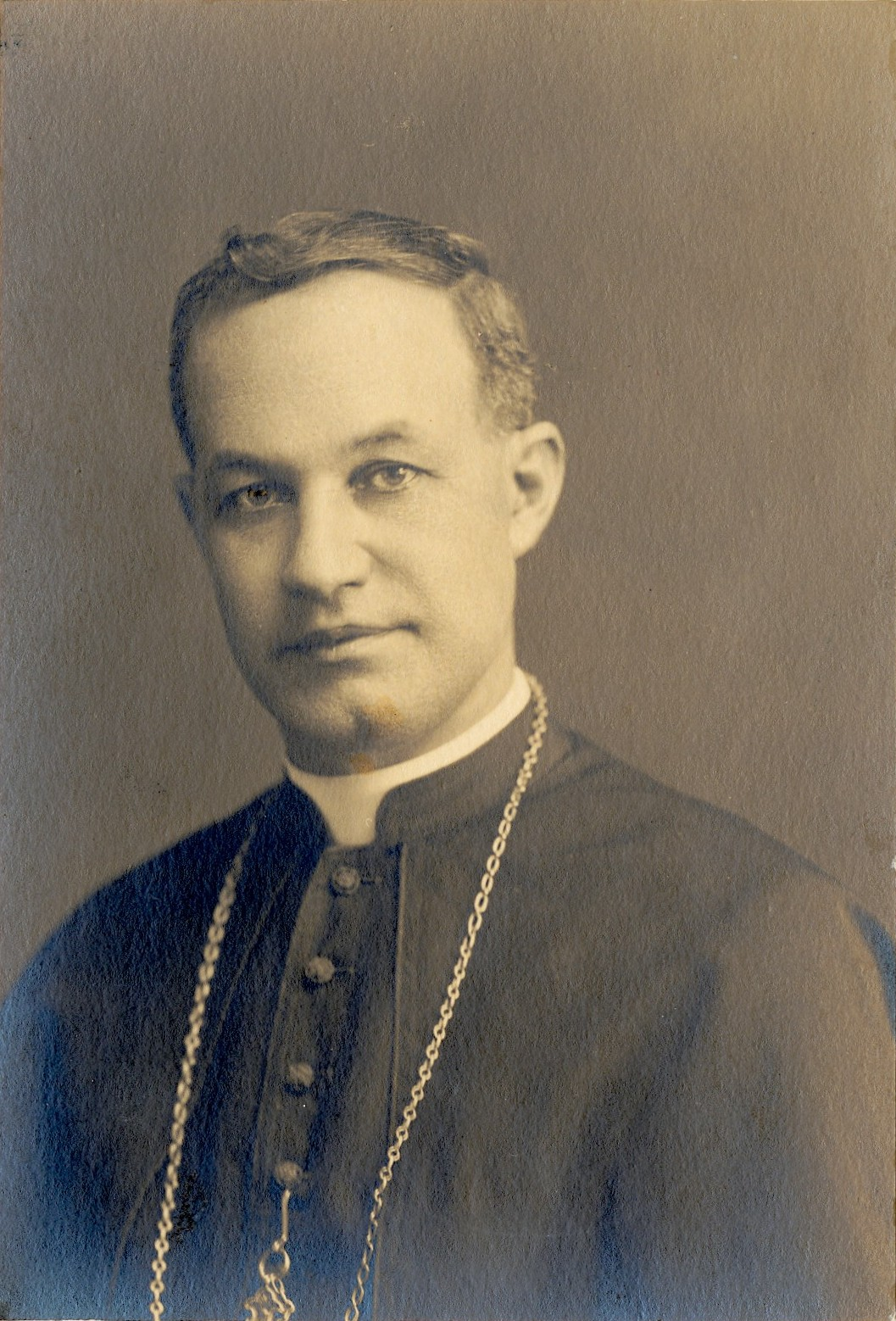
Stephen Alencastre

- 3 November – Stephen Alencastre, Roman Catholic Bishop (died 1940)
- 13 November – Vitorino Guimarães, economist and politician (died 1957)

=== Full date missing ===
- António dos Santos, Olympic shooter (1920).
