= 1873 in Portugal =

- Centuries: 17th; 18th; 19th; 20th; 21st
- Decades: 1850s; 1860s; 1870s; 1880s; 1890s
- See also: List of years in Portugal

Events in the year 1873 in Portugal.

== Incumbents ==
- Monarch: Louis I
- Prime Minister: Fontes Pereira de Melo

== Births ==
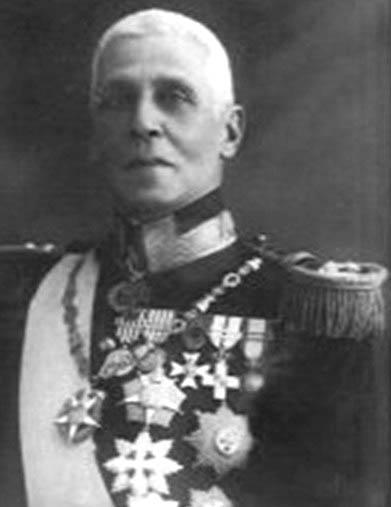
Domingos Oliveira

- 31 July – Domingos Oliveira, politician, military officer (died 1957)

== Deaths ==
=== Full date missing ===
- Amélie of Leuchtenberg, Empress of Brazil, died in Lisbon (born 1812).
