= Henrique de Barros Gomes =

Portuguese politician

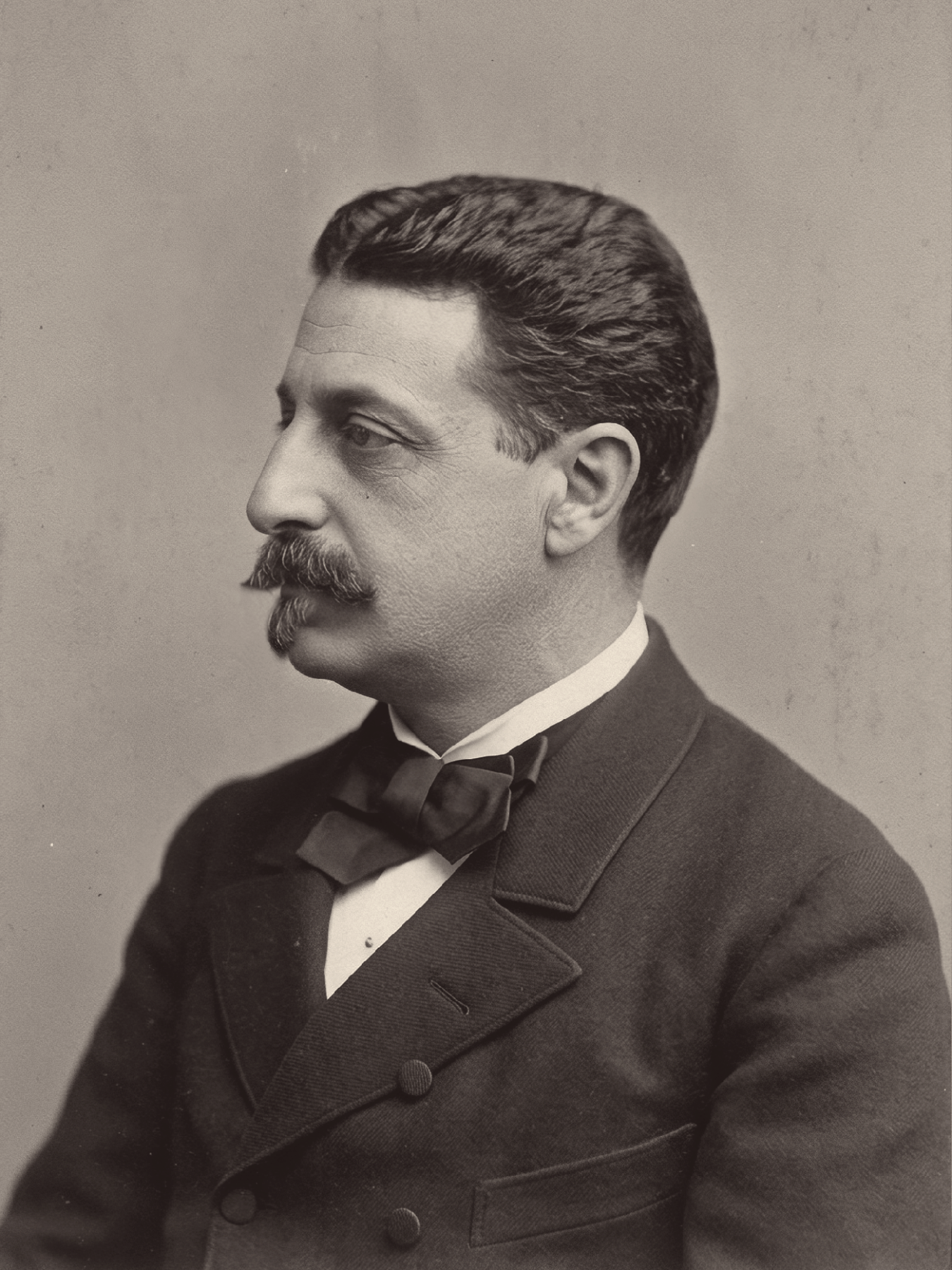

Deputy
- In office 19 May 1870 – 29 August 1870
- Monarch: King Luís I of Portugal
- Prime Minister: João Carlos Saldanha de Oliveira Daun, 1st Duke of Saldanha
- Constituency: Torres Novas
- Majority: Reformist

Deputy
- In office 29 August 1870 – 13 September 1871
- Monarch: King Luís I of Portugal
- Prime Minister: Bernardo de Sá Nogueira de Figueiredo, Marquess of Sá da Bandeira; António José de Ávila, Marquess of Ávila
- Constituency: Santarém
- Majority: Reformist

Minister of Finances and Public Administration
- In office 1 June 1879 – 23 March 1881
- Monarch: King Luís I of Portugal
- Prime Minister: Anselmo José Braamcamp de Almeida Castelo Branco
- Constituency: Santarém
- Majority: Progressive Party

Ministry of Foreign Affairs
- In office 20 February 1886 – 14 January 1890
- Monarchs: King Luís I of Portugal; King Carlos I of Portugal
- Prime Minister: José Luciano de Castro Pereira Côrte-Real
- Constituency: Santarém
- Majority: Progressive Party

Ministry of the Navy and Overseas Territories
- In office 8 May 1887 – 15 September 1887
- Monarch: King Carlos I of Portugal
- Prime Minister: José Luciano de Castro Pereira Côrte-Real
- Constituency: Santarém
- Majority: Progressive Party

Minister of Finances and Public Administration
- In office 23 February 1889 – 9 November 1889
- Monarch: King Carlos I of Portugal
- Prime Minister: José Luciano de Castro Pereira Côrte-Real
- Constituency: Santarém
- Majority: Progressive Party

Personal details
- Born: Henrique de Barros Gomes; 14 September 1843 Lisbon
- Died: 15 November 1898 (aged 55) Alcanhões, Santarém
- Resting place: Santarém
- Party: Reformist Party
- Other political affiliations: Progressive Party
- Spouse: Rita Pessoa de Barros e Sá
- Education: Escola Politécnica de Lisboa
- Occupation: Politician
- Awards: Titles & Decorations: Grand-Cross of the Order of Christ; Order of Leopold; Order of Pius IX; Order of the Rose; Order of Charles III; Order of St. Gregory the Great; Order of Naval Merit (Spain); Order of the Rising Sun; Order of the Crown; Legion of Honour; Order of the Polar Star; Order of the Red Eagle; Order of the White Eagle; Order of São Maurício and Lázaro

Henrique de Barros Gomes (Lisbon, 14 September 1843 – Alcanhões, Santarém, 15 November 1898), was a Portuguese politician, member of the Progressive Party, who assumed the functions of director of the Bank of Portugal, Minister of various Ministries during Regeneration Era politics and member of the Geographic Society of Lisbon, as well as diverse national and international awards of merit. He was noted for his role during the colonial crisis associated with British Ultimatum.

== Biography ==
Henrique de Barros Gomes was born in Lisbon, to Bernardino António Gomes Jr. (physician and pioneer in the use of Chloroform in Portugal) and his spouse, Maria Leocádia Fernandes Tavares de Barros Gomes. His paternal grandfather was Bernardino António Gomes, a recognized medic and specialist in Brazilian botany, who helped introduce vaccination techniques into Portugal. His brother was forest engineer and scientist Bernardino de Barros Gomes.

After his preparatory studies which were completed in Germany, he registered (at the age of 18 years) in the Escola Politécnica de Lisboa, where he completed with distinction, his studies in the military and civil engineering (1865): he obtained an award of merit in five studies and qualifications for awards in his remaining courses. During this part of his life, he became interested in the study of mathematics and astronomy, authoring several works these themes, including A Astronomia Moderna e a Questão das Paralaxes Siderais (English: Modern Astronomy and the Question of Celestial Parallaxes), which was published in the Jornal de Sciencias Mathematicas, Physicas e Naturaes (English: Journal of Sciences, Mathematics & Nature) at the Academia Real de Ciências (English: Royal Academy of Sciences) in Lisbon. These interests also allowed him to be a founding member of the Sociedade de Geografia de Lisboa (English: Lisbon Geographic Society) in 1875.

Barros Gomes married Rita Pessoa de Barros e Sá, daughter of António José de Barros e Sá, counsel, representative, minister and peer of the realm, who was responsible for assisting his son-in-law in entering politics. The couple had two children: a daughter and son.

=== Career ===
At the age of 25, he was the elected representative for Torres Novas (during the 11 April 1869 election) under the Reformist Party banner, initiating his political career during the 17th Legislature. After being sworn in on 4 May 1869, he immediately exercised the role of second-secretary for the government in the Chamber of Deputies. In his first intervention (on 10 July 1869), on land contributions, he caused a sensation for his knowledge and breadth of investigation: his discourse was important for launching a career that concentrated on fiscal matters and public finance, that would eventually place in the directorship at the Bank of Portugal. Although his tenure was short, he returned to office the following year for the district of Santarém in the 1870-71 Legislature. During this session, he sat on the 1870-71 Comissão da Fazenda (English: Finance Commission) and the 1870 Comissão dos Expostos (English: Oversight Commission), developing that policies that would serve him later during debates on the question of contributions to house rentals, the discussions on the national budget (1870), reports on fiscal reform, including the abolition of exemptions to financial institutions and the accounts of the Junta de Crédito Público. Also discussed by these commissions were the controversial loan of 18,000$00 contos de réis that the government wanted to complete in 1870.

While member of parliament, he became involved in the management of the Sociedade das Casas de Asilo da Infância Desvalida de Lisboa (English: Society of Homes for the Asylum of Unprotected Infants of Lisbon), a charity that assisted abandoned children. He would continue to support the group throughout his life.

==== Bank of Portugal ====
In 1873 he was elected to the directorship of the Bank of Portugal, a position that he would retain (with a few interruptions) until 1898. By 1887, he had become President of directorate, holding the position during the monetary crisis of 1891 (as Vice-Governor of the institution). He returned to this position again in 1897. During his early tenure, he was pivotal in renegotiating the contracts between the Government and Bank (in 1874), while simultaneously council member in the Lisbon City Hall (where he participated in the finance department) and President of the Associação Comercial de Lisboa (English: Commercial Association of Lisbon). His report to the Bank of Portugal, during the 1876 banking crisis, was instrumental in clarifying the Bank's position and set a direction for resolving outstanding issues. Consequently, he was sent to Funchal during a similar commercial crisis on the island in order to consolidate the Bank of Portugal's interests within the local business bureaus.

==== Party politics ====
In 1876 he returned to politics under the Progressive Party banner, and was elected attorney to the Junta Geral of Lisbon. Later, when the Progressive Party was called on by the King to form a government (on 29 May 1879) he was appointed Ministério dos Negócios da Fazenda (English: Minister of Finances and Public Administration) to the Cortes on 1 June 1879, ultimately resigning from the Bank of Portugal. In the 19 October 1879 general elections, he was returned to his seat in Santarém, but later, accepted the seat in Montalegre during the 23rd Legislature. He held the finance portfolio until 23 March 1881, when the Regenerator Party, captained by António Rodrigues Sampaio assumed power. During his time as Ministro da Fazenda, Barros Gomes reformed taxation policies, as well as creating the Caixa Económica Portuguesa (a banking services corporation for the lower- to middle-classes) within the structure of the Caixa Geral de Depósitos (then the state savings bank). Generally, his policies were cautionary and technical, marked by reformist tendencies and he was able to keep the Portuguese finances in a state of relative equilibrium.

==== Peer-of-the-Realm ====
During the 25th Legislature, in the government of José Luciano de Castro, he was, once again, elected to the seat in Montalegre (6 March 1887). But, he was appointed Peer of the Realm by royal decree on 31 March, and did not begin the session.

In the Chamber of Peers, Barros Gomes turned his attentions again to fiscal questions and public finances, but now with further attention placed on colonial matters and foreign affairs, and specifically the question of maintaining Portuguese sovereignty in Africa. In addition to reorganizing the customs-houses and established policies on industrial contributions, he defended the Treaty of Zaire (1885) and the creation of a District of Congo, in Angola. He sought to improve Portuguese administration in the colonies, especially in matters associated with natural resource extraction and the moral improvement of its population. Barro Gomes promoted the editing and sale of Portuguese pamphlets, in order to reduce the dependency on foreign publications, which were seen as contrary to the interests of Portugal. He was a defender of the Companhia de Moçambique and the maintenance of capital in the Mala Real Portuguesa in the hands of Portuguese, in order to eliminate the possibility of African links being lost to foreign merchants. Barros Gomes also opposed the alteration of the tobacco monopoly, a factor that would continue to spoil the Portuguese political system for decades to come, provoking the fall of many ministers and governments.

==== British Ultimatum ====
During the government of José Luciano de Castro, Barros Gomes assumed the portfolio of the Ministério dos Negócios Estrangeiros (English: Ministry of Foreign Affairs) between 20 February 1886 and 14 January 1890, then later the Ministério da Marinha e Ultramar (English: Ministry of the Navy and Overseas Territories) between 8 May – 15 September 1887, and finally returning to the finance portfolio as Minister of Finance and Public Administration between 23 February – 9 November 1889.

As Minister of Foreign Affairs, he had an important place in the affairs of the Portuguese African colonies. Already Africa was besieged by other European powers, especially Great Britain and Germany, wishing to "carve-up" territories on the continent. At the Berlin Conference, which essentially discussed issues of European occupation, Barros Gomes was successful in deliberations with Germany, that would permit the establishment of "spheres of influence" of the signatory powers in the continent of Africa.

Barros Gomes was also able to sign an accord between the Vatican and Portugal, that would reduce tensions between the Roman Catholic Church and the Portuguese State, and improve the conditions of missionaries in Portuguese Africa.

As Minister of the Navy and Overseas Territories, he promoted expeditions into the continent in order to expand Portuguese territorial influences, and ensure effective occupation in lands that the state wished to annex. It was in this context that the Portuguese Pink Map appeared, which delimited Portuguese aspirations in Africa, marking out an area that extended from Angola to present-day Mozambique. These pretensions, ironically, collided with Portugal's ally Britain, who had their own objectives of uniting an area that extended from Cairo to Cape Town. Although Barros Gomes later denied the paternity of the map, he was always placed responsible for its appearance. The consequence of the Pink Map was a British Ultimatum dispatched in 1890 demanding the end of Portuguese claims to territories in Africa, risking diplomatic consequences or military intervention on the part of Britain to settle their claims. Public reaction was exacerbated when King Carlos I of Portugal was quick to succumb to the threats from Britain. For his part, Barros Gomes, although not responsible for the events, suffered multiple public manifestation of hostility.

=== Later life ===
When José Luciano de Castro's Party returned to power, Barros Gomes was returned to the Ministry of the Navy and Overseas Territories (5 February 1897), and remained in this role until 9 November, when he was moved to the Foreign Affairs portfolio (a role he held intermittently held between 7 February and 10 March of the same year).

He ultimately left this role on 18 August 1898 when he became sick. He died in the Quinta das Ladeiras, in Alcanhões, Santarém, on 15 November 1898.

== Awards ==
During the course of his career Henrique de Barros Gomes was awarded several prestigious and honorific titles: Grand-Cross of the Order of Christ and Order of Leopold, member of the Order of Pius IX (Vatican), the Order of the Rose (Brazil), the Order of Charles III (Spain), the Order of St. Gregory the Great (Holy See), Order of Naval Merit (Spain), Order of the Rising Sun (Japan), Order of the Crown of Italy, the Legion of Honour (France), the Order of the Polar Star (Sweden), the Order of the Red Eagle (Prussia), the Order of the White Eagle (Poland) and the Ordem of São Maurício and Lázaro (Italy).

He was also named Counsel of State by Royal Charter on 7 November 1889.

== Published works ==
Barros Gomes wrote numerous articles on the economy and public finances, including writings in the Jornal do Comércio in Lisbon and the Comércio do Porto. He also published a short treatises titled Uma Digressão a Constantinopla (English: A Digression to Constantinople) and a volume of themes on politics, religion and literature called Convicções (English: Convicctions).

== Sources ==
- Mónica, Maria Filomena, ed. (2005). Dicionário Biográfico Parlamentar (1834-1910) (in Portuguese). Vol. II. Lisbon, Portugal: Assembleia da República. pp. 335–338. ISBN 972-671-145-2.
- Hammond, Richard James (1966). Portugal and Africa, 1815-1910: a study in uneconomic imperialism. Palo Alto, California: Stanford University Press.
