= 1872 in Portugal =

- Centuries: 17th; 18th; 19th; 20th; 21st
- Decades: 1850s; 1860s; 1870s; 1880s; 1890s
- See also: List of years in Portugal

Events in the year 1872 in Portugal.

== Incumbents ==
- Monarch: Louis I
- Prime Minister: Fontes Pereira de Melo

== Births ==
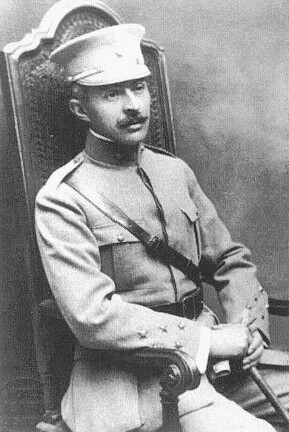
Sidónio Pais

- 2 February – Tomé de Barros Queirós, trader and politician (died 1925)
- 1 May – Sidónio Pais, politician and diplomat (died 1918).
- 18 June – Ana de Castro Osório, writer, journalist, feminist and republican activist (died 1935)
