= 1874 in Portugal =

- Centuries: 17th; 18th; 19th; 20th; 21st
- Decades: 1850s; 1860s; 1870s; 1880s; 1890s
- See also: List of years in Portugal

Events in the year 1874 in Portugal.

== Incumbents ==
- Monarch: Louis I
- Prime Minister: Fontes Pereira de Melo

== Events ==
- 12 July – Legislative election

== Births ==
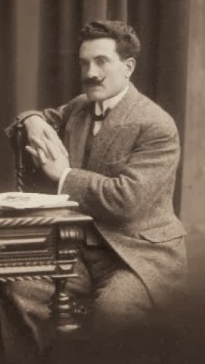
Félix Bermudes

- 3 May – António Ginestal Machado, politician (died 1940)
- 4 July – Félix Bermudes, Olympic shooter (1924) and author (died 1960).
- 29 November – António Egas Moniz, neurologist, winner of the Nobel Prize for Physiology or Medicine (1949) (died 1955).
