= Count of Ávila =

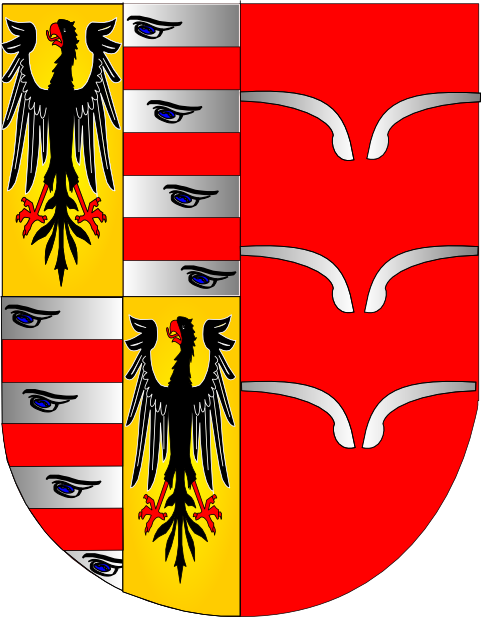
- Creation date: 13 February 1864 (decree); 15 February 1864 (royal letter)
- Created by: Luís I of Portugal
- Peerage: Kingdom of Portugal
- First holder: António José de Ávila
- Last holder: António José de Ávila (1842–1917)
- Remainder to: Life grant (renewed once, in 1890)

Count of Ávila (in Portuguese: Conde de Ávila) was a Portuguese title of nobility created for life by King Luís I, by decree of 13 February and royal letter of 15 February 1864, in favour of António José de Ávila.

The 1st Count was later raised to Marquis of Ávila and Bolama, by decree of 24 May and royal letter of 31 May 1870, and to Duke of Ávila and Bolama in 1878. He had no issue. The countship was renewed for life in favour of his nephew, António José de Ávila, in 1890, (Note: The Dicionário Biográfico Parlamentar gives the date of the decree as 25 January 1890 and Canedo as 31 January 1890. Zúquete differs, giving 25 January 1881.) and in 1903 the nephew was also created 2nd Marquis of Ávila and Bolama.

== History ==
The family descended from Domingos António de Ávila, a landowner on the island of Faial, and his wife, Brites Antónia. Their eldest son, Manuel José de Ávila, a registered merchant at the Faial Commercial Exchange, was the father of the 1st Count.

The title was granted for life to António José de Ávila (1807–1881), a philosophy graduate of the University of Coimbra, peer of the Realm from 1861, several times a minister, three times President of the Council of Ministers and president of the Chamber of Peers from 1872. In 1850 he married Emília Hegnauer, with whom he had no children.

By decree of January 1890, King Carlos I renewed the title for life in favour of the 1st Count's nephew, António José de Ávila (1842–1917), born at Horta, on Faial, the son of Manuel José de Ávila, the 1st Count's brother, and Maria Leonor de Almeida e Silva. A General Staff officer, he rose to the rank of general and was director-general of the Geodetic and Topographical Works of the Kingdom from 1901 to 1912, a peer of the Realm and president of Lisbon City Council. By decree of 31 December 1903, on the occasion of the visit of Alfonso XIII to Portugal, he was created 2nd Marquis of Ávila and Bolama. On 30 January 1884 he had married Leonor Maria de Assis Mascarenhas (1853–1923), in the church of the former Convent of São Domingos de Benfica. He died without issue in 1917.

== Coat of arms ==
The arms of the Counts of Ávila are those granted to António José de Ávila by a charter granting new arms dated 9 October 1860: party per pale, the dexter quarterly, first and fourth Or, an eagle displayed sable, second and third argent, three bars gules charged with four eyes shaded azure arranged bendwise; the sinister gules, six ribs argent in two pales of three. Crest: an eagle displayed sable upon the coronet of a Councillor of State.

== Counts of Ávila (1864) ==
#	Holder	Dates	Titles	Notes	Ref.
1	António José de Ávila	1807–1881	1st Count of Ávila (1st Marquis of Ávila and Bolama, 1870; 1st Duke of Ávila and Bolama, 1878)	Title granted for life by decree of 13 February and royal letter of 15 February 1864. Married in 1850 Emília Hegnauer.	
2	António José de Ávila	1842–1917	2nd Count of Ávila (2nd Marquis of Ávila and Bolama, 1903)	Nephew of the 1st Count. Renewed for life by decree of January 1890. Created 2nd Marquis of Ávila and Bolama by decree of 31 December 1903. Married in 1884 Leonor Maria de Assis Mascarenhas.	

== Claimants under the Republic ==
Following the establishment of the Republic in 1910, the state stopped granting titles of nobility. Since then, the following members of the family have claimed to represent the title:

#	Name	Dates	Titles claimed	Notes	Ref.
3	Manuel de Carvalho de Ávila	1886–1979	3rd Count of Ávila	Nephew of the 2nd Count. Married twice: in 1911 Eugénia dos Santos and, in 1945, Maria Georgina Howell da Silva.	

== Gallery ==
Tomb of the 1st Duke of Ávila and Bolama in Prazeres Cemetery, Lisbon (August 2025)

== See also ==
- Marquis of Ávila and Bolama
- Duke of Ávila and Bolama
- António José de Ávila, 1st Duke of Ávila and Bolama
