= Marquis of Ávila and Bolama =

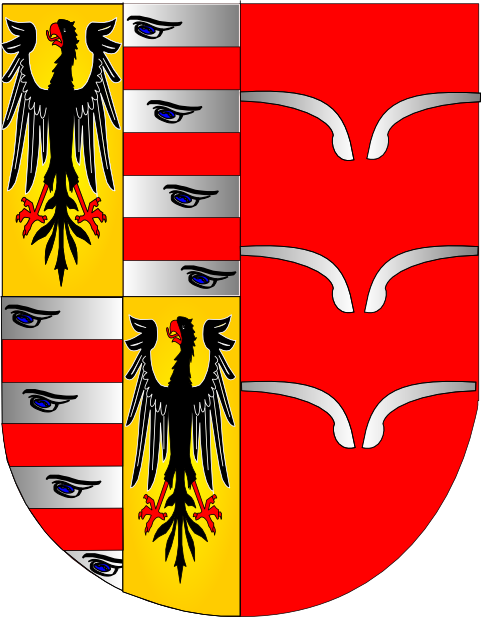
- Creation date: 24 May 1870 (decree); 31 May 1870 (royal letter)
- Created by: Luís I of Portugal
- Peerage: Kingdom of Portugal
- First holder: António José de Ávila
- Last holder: António José de Ávila (1842–1917)
- Remainder to: Life grant (renewed once, in 1903)
- Subsidiary titles: Count of Ávila

Marquis of Ávila and Bolama (in Portuguese: Marquês de Ávila e Bolama) was a Portuguese title of nobility created for life by King Luís I, by decree of 24 May and royal letter of 31 May 1870, in favour of António José de Ávila, 1st Count of Ávila.

The 1st Marquis was raised to Duke of Ávila and Bolama in 1878. He had no issue, and the title of marquis was renewed in 1903, also for life, in favour of his nephew António José de Ávila, who had been 2nd Count of Ávila since 1890. (Note: The Dicionário Biográfico Parlamentar gives the date of the decree creating the 2nd Count as 25 January 1890 and Canedo as 31 January 1890. Zúquete differs, giving 25 January 1881.)

== History ==
The title was created for António José de Ávila (1807–1881), a native of Horta, who served several times as a minister, three times as President of the Council of Ministers and as president of the Chamber of Peers. He had received the title of Count of Ávila in 1864 and was raised to Duke of Ávila and Bolama in 1878.

The 2nd Marquis, António José de Ávila, was born in the parish of Nossa Senhora das Angústias, in Horta, on the island of Faial, on 7 November 1842. He was the son of Manuel José de Ávila, brother of the 1st Marquis, and his wife, Maria Leonor de Almeida e Silva, and died in Lisbon on 18 March 1917.

He enlisted in the 10th Infantry Regiment in 1863 and, having graduated in mathematics from the University of Coimbra, completed the General Staff course. He was promoted to captain in 1873, major in 1884, lieutenant colonel in 1890, colonel in 1893 and brigadier general in 1906, and passed to the reserve in 1909.

He was elected deputy in 1874 for the constituency of Valpaços, for the 1875–1878 legislature, and was re-elected in several later legislatures. He was elected a peer of the Realm in 1885 and appointed a life peer in 1901. From 1901 to 1912 he was director-general of the Geodetic and Topographical Works of the Kingdom. He presided over Lisbon City Council and was a corresponding member of the Academy of Sciences. He published studies in geodesy and cartography, including A Nova Carta Corográfica de Portugal (The New Chorographic Map of Portugal, 1909–1914), as well as A Marquesa de Alorna (The Marchioness of Alorna, 1916). Among other decorations, he was a grand cross of the Order of Our Lady of the Conception of Vila Viçosa and of the Spanish Order of Military Merit.

He received for life the title of Count of Ávila, by decree of January 1890 from King Carlos I, and that of Marquis of Ávila and Bolama, by decree of 31 December 1903, also from King Carlos I, on the occasion of the visit of Alfonso XIII to Portugal.

On 30 January 1884, in the Church of Nossa Senhora do Rosário of the former Convent of São Domingos de Benfica, he married Leonor Maria de Assis Mascarenhas (1853–1923). She was the natural daughter, legitimised in 1854, of General Carlos Mascarenhas, brother of the 7th Marquis of Fronteira, and of Maria Luísa Falco Barata Feio. She was lady of the palace of São Domingos de Benfica and of most of the property of her cousin, the 8th Marchioness of Fronteira, and died in Lisbon on 17 February 1923. The couple had no children.

== Coat of arms ==
The arms are those granted to António José de Ávila by a charter granting new arms dated 9 October 1860: party per pale, the dexter quarterly, first and fourth Or, an eagle displayed sable, second and third argent, three bars gules charged with four eyes shaded azure arranged bendwise; the sinister gules, six ribs argent in two pales of three. Crest: an eagle displayed sable upon the coronet of a Councillor of State.

== Marquises of Ávila and Bolama (1870) ==
#	Holder	Dates	Titles	Notes	Ref.
1	António José de Ávila	1807–1881	1st Marquis of Ávila and Bolama (1st Duke of Ávila and Bolama, 1878; 1st Count of Ávila, 1864)	Title granted for life by decree of 24 May and royal letter of 31 May 1870. Married in 1850 Emília Hegnauer.	
2	António José de Ávila	1842–1917	2nd Marquis of Ávila and Bolama, 1903 (2nd Count of Ávila, 1890)	Nephew of the 1st Marquis. Renewed for life by decree of 31 December 1903. Created 2nd Count of Ávila by decree of January 1890. Married in 1884 Leonor Maria de Assis Mascarenhas.	

== Gallery ==
Tomb of the 1st Duke of Ávila and Bolama in Prazeres Cemetery, Lisbon (August 2025)

== See also ==
- Count of Ávila
- Duke of Ávila and Bolama
- António José de Ávila, 1st Duke of Ávila and Bolama
- List of marquisates in Portugal
