= 1879 Portuguese legislative election =

- 19 October 1879

All seats in the Chamber of Deputies
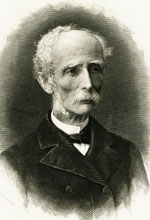

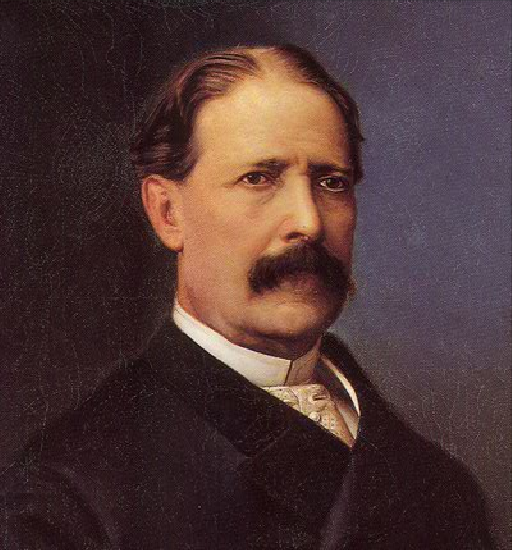

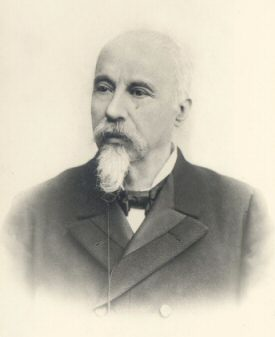
	First party	Second party
Leader	Anselmo José Braamcamp	Fontes Pereira de Melo
Party	Progressive	Regenerator
Seats won	106	21
	Third party	Fourth party
		Rep
Leader	José Dias Ferreira	Political Directory
Party	Constituent	Republican
Seats won	6	1
Prime Minister before election
Anselmo José Braamcamp
Progressive
Prime Minister after election
Anselmo José Braamcamp
Progressive

Parliamentary elections were held in Portugal on 19 October 1879. The result was a landslide victory for the Progressive Party, which won 106 seats.

== Results ==
Party	Votes	%	Seats
Progressive Party			106
Regenerator Party			21
Constituent Party			6
Portuguese Republican Party			1
Other parties and independents			3
Total			137
Total votes	539,915	–	
Registered voters/turnout	831,764	64.91	
Source: Nohlen & Stöver

The results exclude the seats from overseas territories.
