= Bernardino António Gomes Jr. =

Portuguese physician and scientist

Councillor Bernardino António Gomes Jr. CavTE ComC ComSE
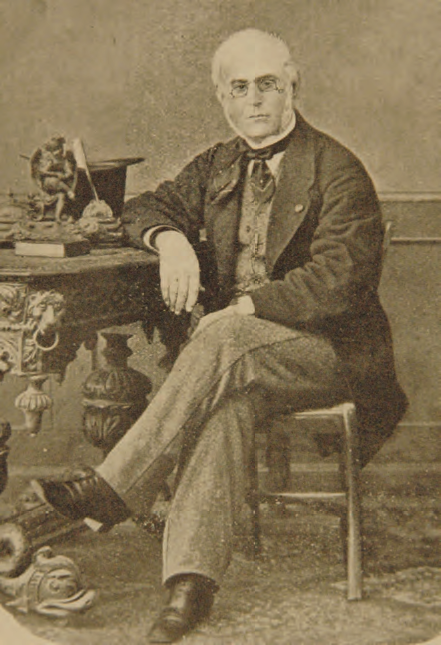

First Physician of the Royal Chamber
- In office January 1864 – April 1877
- Monarch: Luís I of Portugal
- Preceded by: The Baron of Silveira
- Succeeded by: José Eduardo de Magalhães Coutinho

Personal details
- Born: 22 September 1806 Santa Marinha do Outeiro, Lisbon, Portugal
- Died: 8 April 1877 (aged 70) São José, Lisbon, Portugal
- Spouse: Maria Leocádia Fernandes Tavares de Barros (m. 1837; died 1854)
- Education: University of Coimbra; Faculté de Médecine de Paris
- Scientific career
- Fields: Medicine, Anaesthesiology
- Workplaces: Royal Naval Hospital; Saint Joseph's Hospital
- Thesis: Dissertation sur les vers plats articulés qui existent chez l'homme, ou considérations sur la détermination de leurs espèces, des maladies qu'ils occasionnent, et du traitement qu'ils convient mieux de leur opposer (1831)

Bernardino António Gomes CavTE ComC ComSE (22 September 1806 – 8 April 1877) was a Portuguese medical doctor and scientist. He is perhaps most widely remembered for his pioneering work in Portugal in the field of anaesthesiology, as the first physician in the country to use chloroform in a surgical procedure (on 12 January 1848, during a knee tumorectomy); he is also credited with the popularization of the use of creosote and of the first ether inhalers.

== Biography ==
Bernardino António Gomes was the son of noted physician, pioneering dermatologist, chemist, and botanist of name, Bernardino António Gomes Sr. (1768–1823), and his wife Leonor Violante Rosa Mourão (1775–1864). He was baptised on 9 October 1806, in the parish of Santa Engrácia, Lisbon.

He first studied Mathematics in the University of Coimbra, switching to Medicine after obtaining the first degree. He interrupted his studies in 1828, with the start of the Portuguese Civil War; he joined the Academic Battalion but soon after, judging, like many did, the Liberal cause lost when King Miguel I seized the throne, he departed to Paris, where he completed his medical studies in 1831. At the invitation of the Marquis of Palmela, who was part of the Liberal government-in-opposition, Bernardino António Gomes rejoined the Liberal forces in Terceira Island in the Azores: he would later take part in the Landing at Mindelo, the turning point of the Civil War, and was in the besieged resistance at the Siege of Porto (during which he provided medical assistance due to a cholera outbreak). As the Constitutional Monarchy was finally established, he filled the positions of Director of the Royal Naval Hospital, Chairman of the Council for Naval Health, physician of Saint Joseph's Hospital, and Professor at the Lisbon Medical-Surgical School (Chair of Materia Medica from 1837 to 1857).

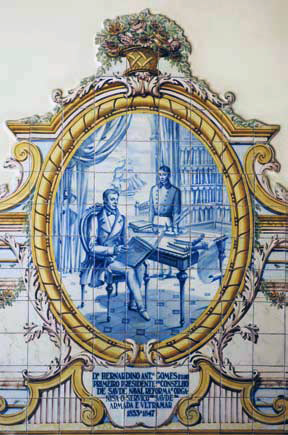
Azulejo panels at the old Royal Naval Hospital in Lisbon, mentioning his role in the reform of the Navy medical services

Bernardino António Gomes distinguished himself during the yellow fever and cholera epidemics that ravaged the country in the 1850s. He was sent as a national delegate to the third of the International Sanitary Conferences (in Constantinople, 1866); in opposition to Pettenkofer's anti-contagionism that dominated the scientific thinking of the conference, Bernardino António Gomes was a staunch defender of the theory of contagion and considered it advisable to ban all maritime communication to quell the ongoing cholera pandemic that had begun in the Ganges Delta, "to combat the scourge in the very countries in which it is born or, at least, to halt its progress as near as possible to its original home" (measures that were opposed, notably, by the delegates from the United Kingdom).

In 1858, Bernardino António Gomes became embroiled in a heated pamphlet war with the Duke of Saldanha, one of the leading promoters of homeopathy and other systems of alternative medicine like mesmerism or the "Raspail method" in the country. The tone of the replies quickly escalated, with Bernardino António Gomes protesting that the Duke was hardly an authority when he clearly had so little baggage and was armed with such lacking medical literature — something, he wrote, that did not stop him from openly casting doubt on science and making the public mistrustful of medical practitioners.

He was appointed First Physician of the Royal Chamber in 1864, by King Luís I, following the death of Francisco Elias Rodrigues da Silveira, 1st Baron of Silveira; Gomes refused the title of Baron that was customarily bestowed upon those filling that position at court. Previously, he had already been a personal physician to his brother and predecessor King Peter V — Bernardino António Gomes was responsible for conducting and publicising the results of the King's autopsy in 1861, when tensions were running high as three deaths in quick succession within the Royal Family (the King, Infante John, Duke of Beja and Infante Ferdinand) had made the public suspicious of foul play and threaten to mutiny; he attributed the deaths to typhoid fever.

On two different occasions, in 1843–4 and 1864–6, Bernardino António Gomes served as President of the Lisbon Society of Medical Sciences.

As a natural historian, Bernardino António Gomes published an exhaustive review of the fossil flora of the Carboniferous systems in Portugal (1865), and was a contributor in the Catalogus Plantarum Horti Botanici Medico-Cirurgicae Scholae Olisiponensis (1851). He also oversaw the committee in charge of creating the 1876 Portuguese Pharmacopoeia, the first time the country's official pharmaceutical reference work was drawn up by a committee of select physicians and chemists.

He married Maria Leocádia Fernandes Tavares de Barros (1818–1854) in the parish of Encarnação, Lisbon, on 14 October 1837. They were the parents of botanist, forestry engineer, and Lazarite priest Bernardino António de Barros Gomes (1839–1910), and statesman Henrique de Barros Gomes (1843–1898).

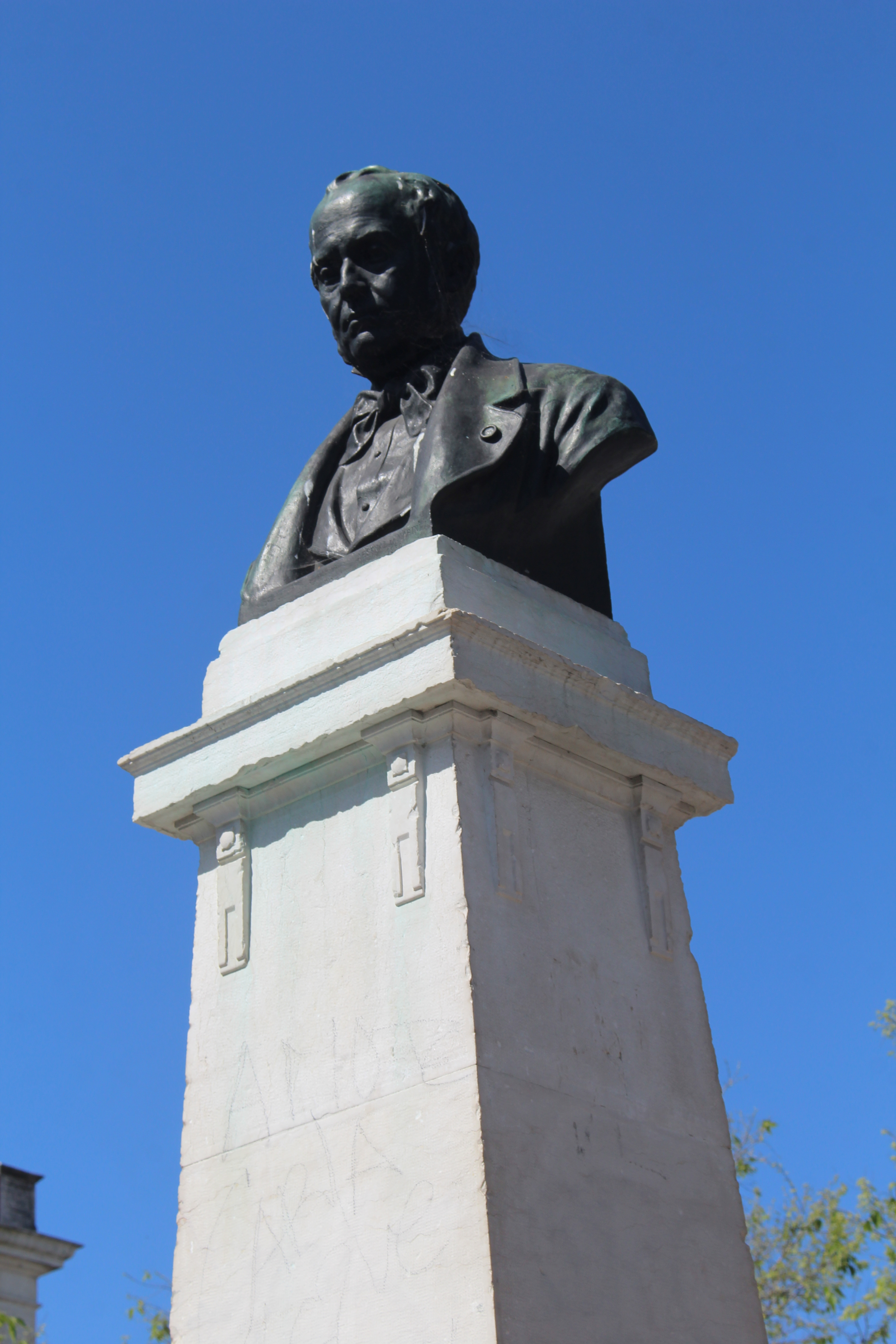
A bust of Bernardino António Gomes in Lisbon, Portugal

== Distinctions ==
=== National orders ===
- Knight of the Order of the Tower and Sword
- Commander of the Order of Christ
- Commander of the Order of Saint James of the Sword

=== Foreign orders ===
- Officer of the Legion of Honour (France)
- Commander of the Order of Saints Maurice and Lazarus (Italy)
- Grand Cross of the Order of Isabella the Catholic (Spain)
