= Revista Militar =

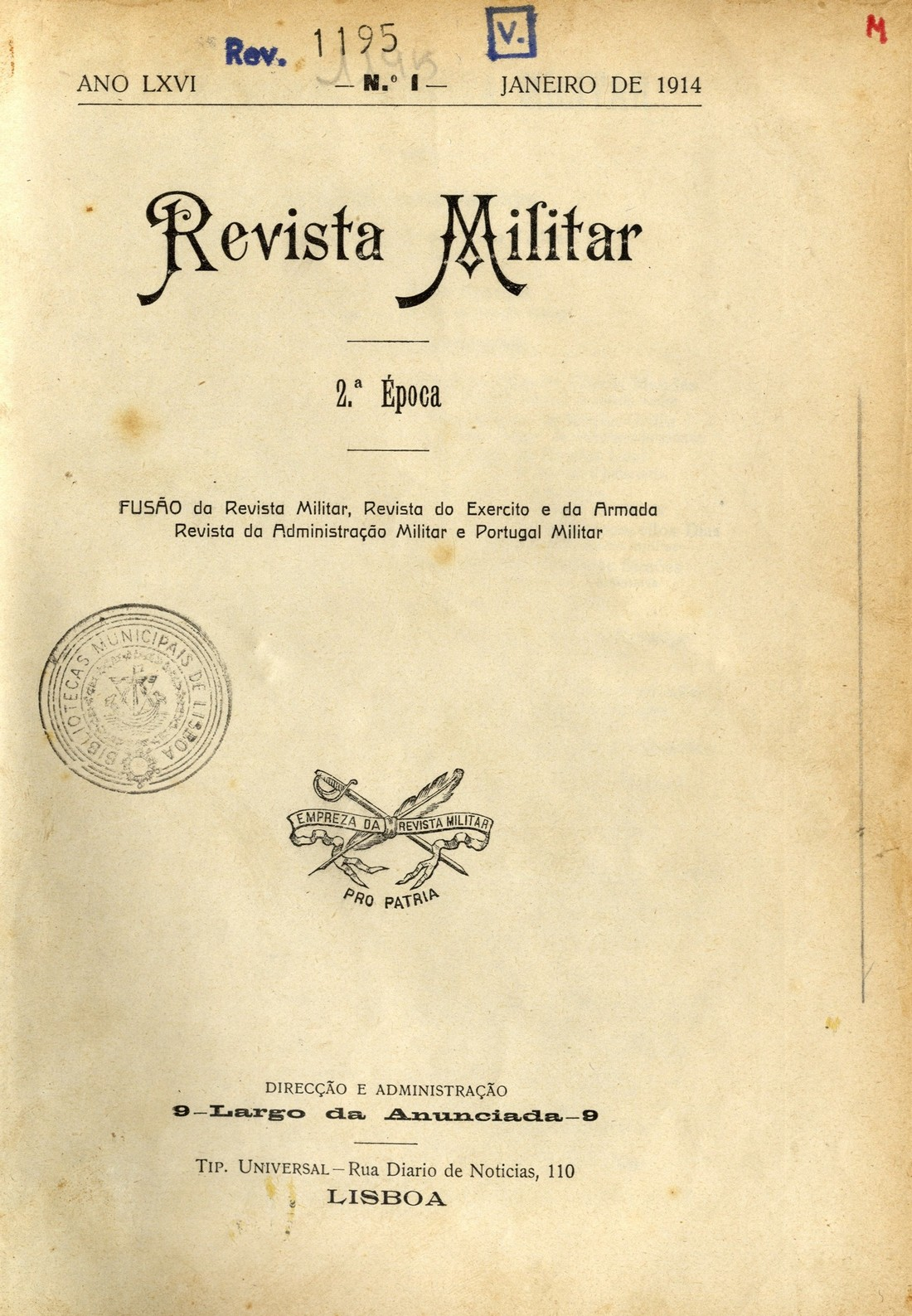
- Issue No. 1, 2nd series, January 1914
- Discipline: Military
- Language: Portuguese

Publication details
- History: 1848–present
- Frequency: 9 issues per year (January, February/March, April, May, June/July, August/September, October, November, and December)

Standard abbreviations
- ISO 4: Rev. Mil.

Indexing
- ISSN: 0873-7630

Links
- Journal homepage

The Revista Militar, first published in January 1849, is the oldest continuing military journal in the world. It was founded on 1 December 1848 by a group of officers of the Portuguese Army and Navy, led by Lieutenant Fontes Pereira de Mello, of Portugal's Royal Corps of Engineers.
