= Duke of Ávila and Bolama =

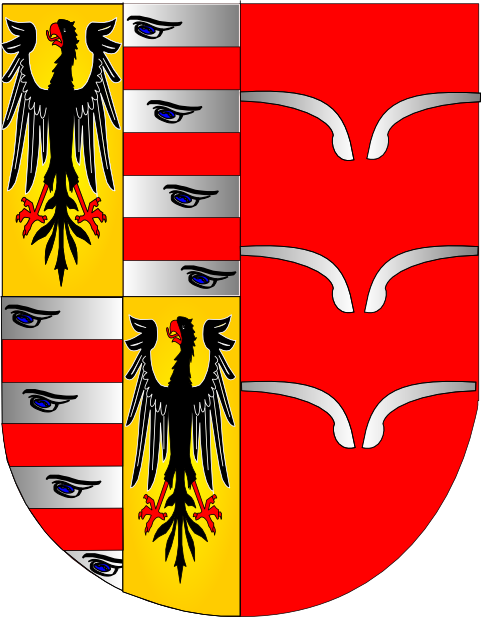
- Creation date: 14 March 1878
- Created by: Luís I of Portugal
- Peerage: Kingdom of Portugal
- First holder: António José de Ávila
- Last holder: António José de Ávila
- Remainder to: Life grant
- Subsidiary titles: Marquis of Ávila and Bolama; Count of Ávila
- Extinction date: 1881 (death of the only holder)

Duke of Ávila and Bolama (in Portuguese: Duque de Ávila e Bolama) was a Portuguese title of nobility created by King Luís I, by royal letter of 14 March 1878, (Note: Zúquete gives the date as a decree of 14 May 1878.) in favour of António José de Ávila, 1st Count of Ávila and 1st Marquis of Ávila and Bolama.

The holder had previously received the titles of Count of Ávila (1864) and Marquis of Ávila and Bolama (1870), both for life and later renewed in favour of his nephew, António José de Ávila. The dukedom had only one holder.

== History ==
The title was granted to António José de Ávila (1807–1881), (Note: The Dicionário Histórico and Ruvigny give his date of birth as 8 March 1806.) a native of Horta, on the island of Faial, son of Manuel José de Ávila, a registered merchant at the Faial Commercial Exchange, and his wife, Prudência Joaquina Cândida da Costa. A philosophy graduate of the University of Coimbra, he was deputy for Faial from 1834, several times Minister of Finance, a Councillor of State (1850) and a peer of the Realm (1861). He served three times as President of the Council of Ministers: in 1868, after the Janeirinha; in 1870–1871; and in 1877–1878. In 1872 he was appointed president of the Chamber of Peers for life.

As minister plenipotentiary in Madrid in 1865, António José de Ávila was tasked with studying the question of Bolama, in which he secured acceptance of the Portuguese position.

King Luís I had granted him, for life, the title of Count of Ávila, by decree of 13 February and royal letter of 15 February 1864, and that of Marquis of Ávila and Bolama, by decree of 24 May and royal letter of 31 May 1870. He left the premiership on 29 January 1878 and was raised to Duke of Ávila and Bolama on 14 March 1878, the day on which he presided over the session of the Cortes at which the heir to the throne, the future King Carlos I, took the oath prescribed by the Constitutional Charter.

In 1850 he married Emília Hegnauer (1829–1910), daughter of Segismundo Hegnauer, and he died in Lisbon on 3 May 1881 without issue. Unlike the titles of count and marquis, which were renewed in favour of his nephew, the ducal title was never granted again.

== Coat of arms ==
By a charter granting new arms dated 9 October 1860, António José de Ávila was granted the following arms: party per pale, the dexter quarterly, first and fourth Or, an eagle displayed sable, second and third argent, three bars gules charged with four eyes shaded azure arranged bendwise; the sinister gules, six ribs argent in two pales of three. Crest: an eagle displayed sable upon the coronet of a Councillor of State.

== Dukes of Ávila and Bolama (1878) ==
#	Holder	Dates	Titles	Notes	Ref.
1	António José de Ávila	1807–1881	1st Duke of Ávila and Bolama (1st Marquis of Ávila and Bolama, 1870; 1st Count of Ávila, 1864)	Title granted for life by royal letter of 14 March 1878. President of the Council of Ministers (1868, 1870–1871 and 1877–1878) and president of the Chamber of Peers. Married in 1850 Emília Hegnauer.	

== Gallery ==
Tomb of the 1st Duke of Ávila and Bolama in Prazeres Cemetery, Lisbon (August 2025)

== See also ==
- Count of Ávila
- Marquis of Ávila and Bolama
- António José de Ávila, 1st Duke of Ávila and Bolama
- List of dukedoms in Portugal
