= Zé Povinho =

Portuguese everyman character

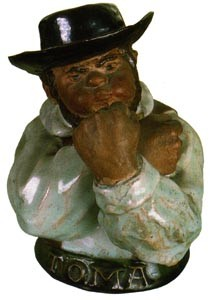
Zé Povinho in Caldas da Rainha porcelain.

Zé Povinho is the cartoon character of a Portuguese everyman created by Rafael Bordalo Pinheiro. After an extended break (due to the creator travelling to Rio de Janeiro) Zé Povinho returned to the printed page in the O António Maria newspaper, and appeared in two more newspapers before the last drawing by the original creator in November 1904. Zé Povinho became first a symbol of the Portuguese working-class people, and eventually into the unofficial personification of Portugal. The character is often used to criticize politics and political figures.

== History ==
It made its first appearance in the 5th edition of the A Lanterna Mágica newspaper, on 12 June 1875, in a caricature called titled "Portugueze Calendar", alluding to taxes, where the Minister of Finance, Serpa Pimentel, appears withdrawing a three-cent alms from Zé Povinho for Anthony of Padua (represented by Fontes Pereira de Melo) with the "kid" (D. Luís I) in his lap, having by his side the commander of the National Republican Guard, with a whip in his hand, there to prevent an eventual resistance.

In the next editions of the newspaper, the Zé Povinho caricature continued to appear with the character with his mouth open and not intervening, resigned when faced with the corruption and injustice, kneeled by the tax load and unaware of the big issues of the country.

He took a tridimensional form, becoming popular in the ceramic form made by the Faianças Factory in Caldas da Rainha, starting in the last quarter of the 19th Century.

A prominent figure of the Bordalo Pinheiro caricature, it became an identifying figure of the Portuguese people, critiquing in a humoristic way the main social, political and economical problems of the country during its history, caricaturing the Portuguese people in their characteristic eternal revolt before the abandonment and forgetfulness of the political class, even though they do little to nothing to change the situation.

The character was cited by E. F. Piloni in messages to J.M.D. Marçal Jr., when comparing him to a dramatic hotshot that, now it's worth something, then it loses its value. Affectionately coined by the author of the joke, leaving a certain look of confusion when saying that it he was a common, simple man; Zé. A popular expression that means simple people, an individual from the people. It's used to identify a socially disqualified person. Zé, is a popular way to express the people's man.

== Characteristics ==
Bordalo Pinheiro himself defined the character: "Zé Povinho looks to a side then to another and... he stays like always... the same".

Although, despite being relatively simple, he's a figure full of contradiction:

"But if he is patient, gullible, submissive, humble, tame, apathetic, indifferent, abulic, skeptic, suspicious, disbeliever and lonely, he doesn't stop showing up, in a constant contradiction with himself, simultaneously capable of appearing in disbelief, revolted, grumpy, insolent, furious, sensitive, compassionate, skittish, active, supportive, outgoing...".

The character has as its main characteristic the signature "manguito" gesture, representing his revolt and insolence facet.

== Gallery ==
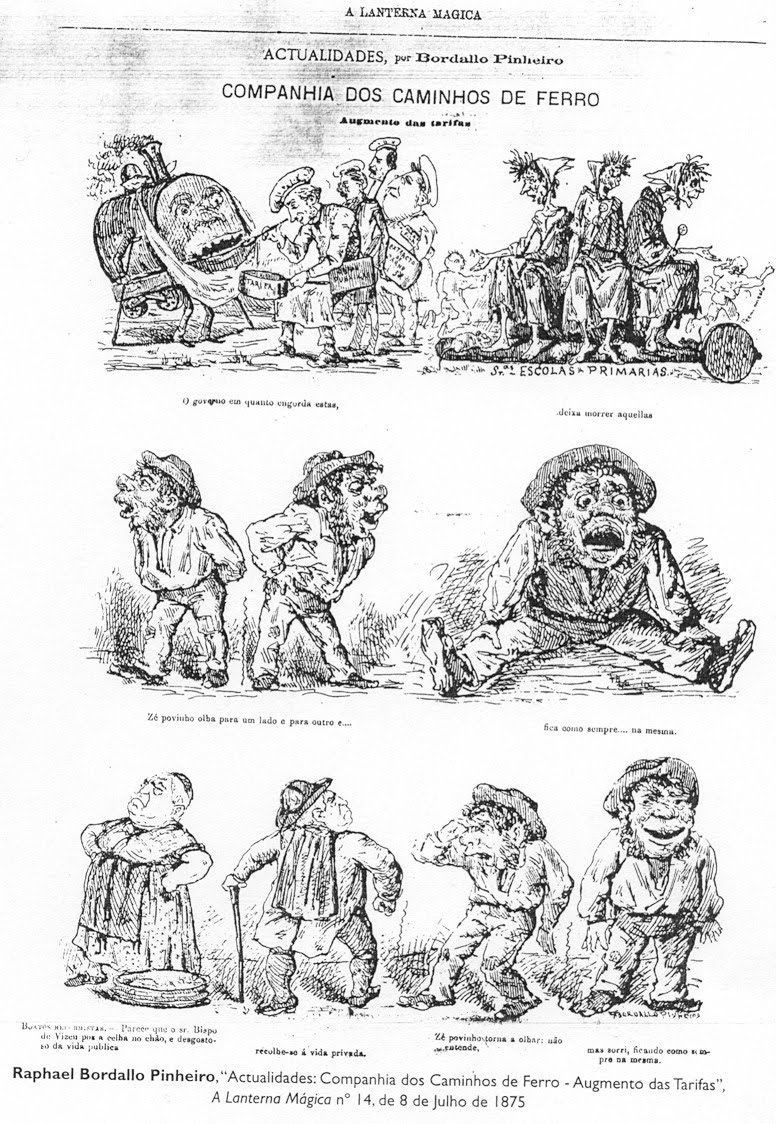
First apparition of Zé Povinho in A Lanterna Mágica magazine, 12 June 1875

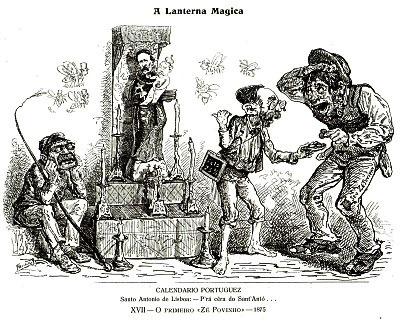
Zé Povinho in A Lanterna Mágica, 1875

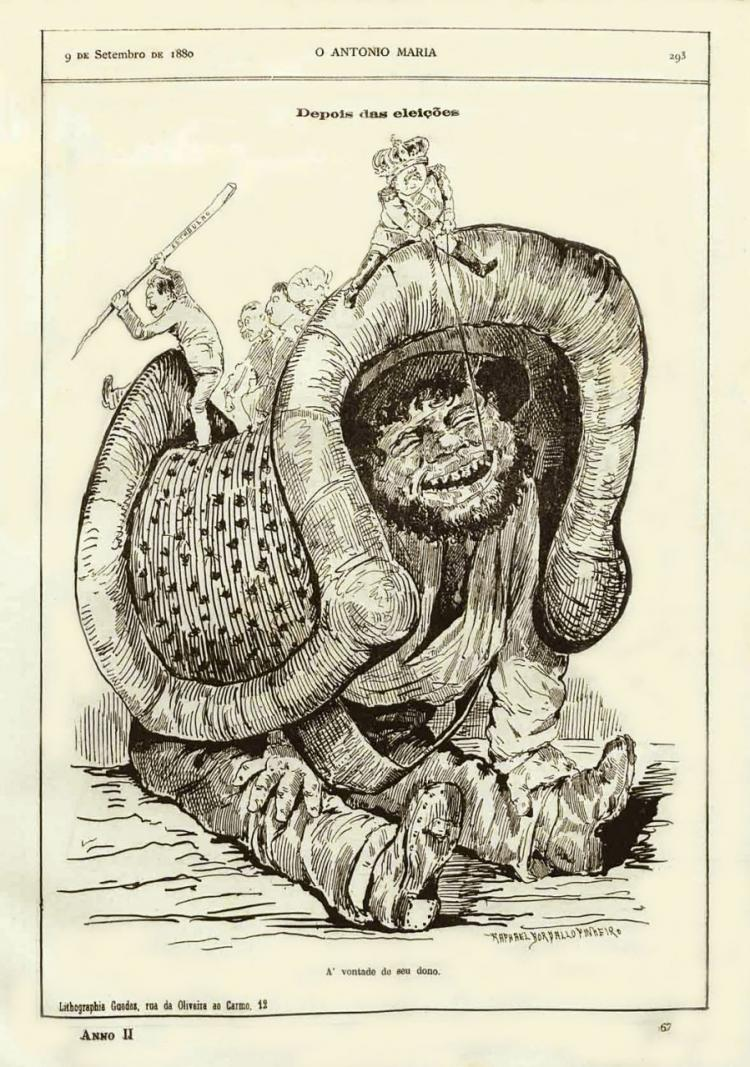
Zé Povinho in the O António Maria magazine, 1880

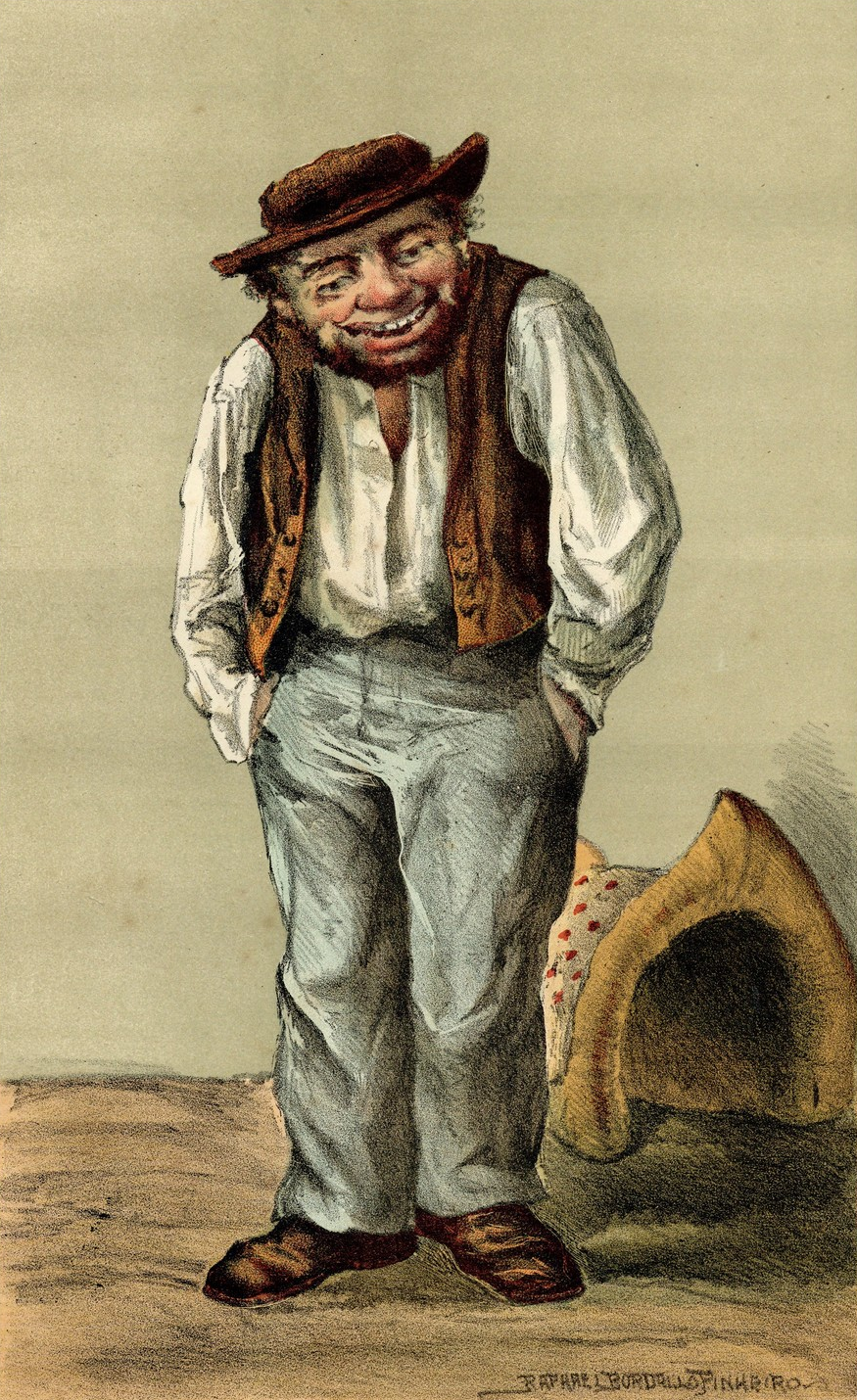
Colour drawing of Zé Povinho, 1882

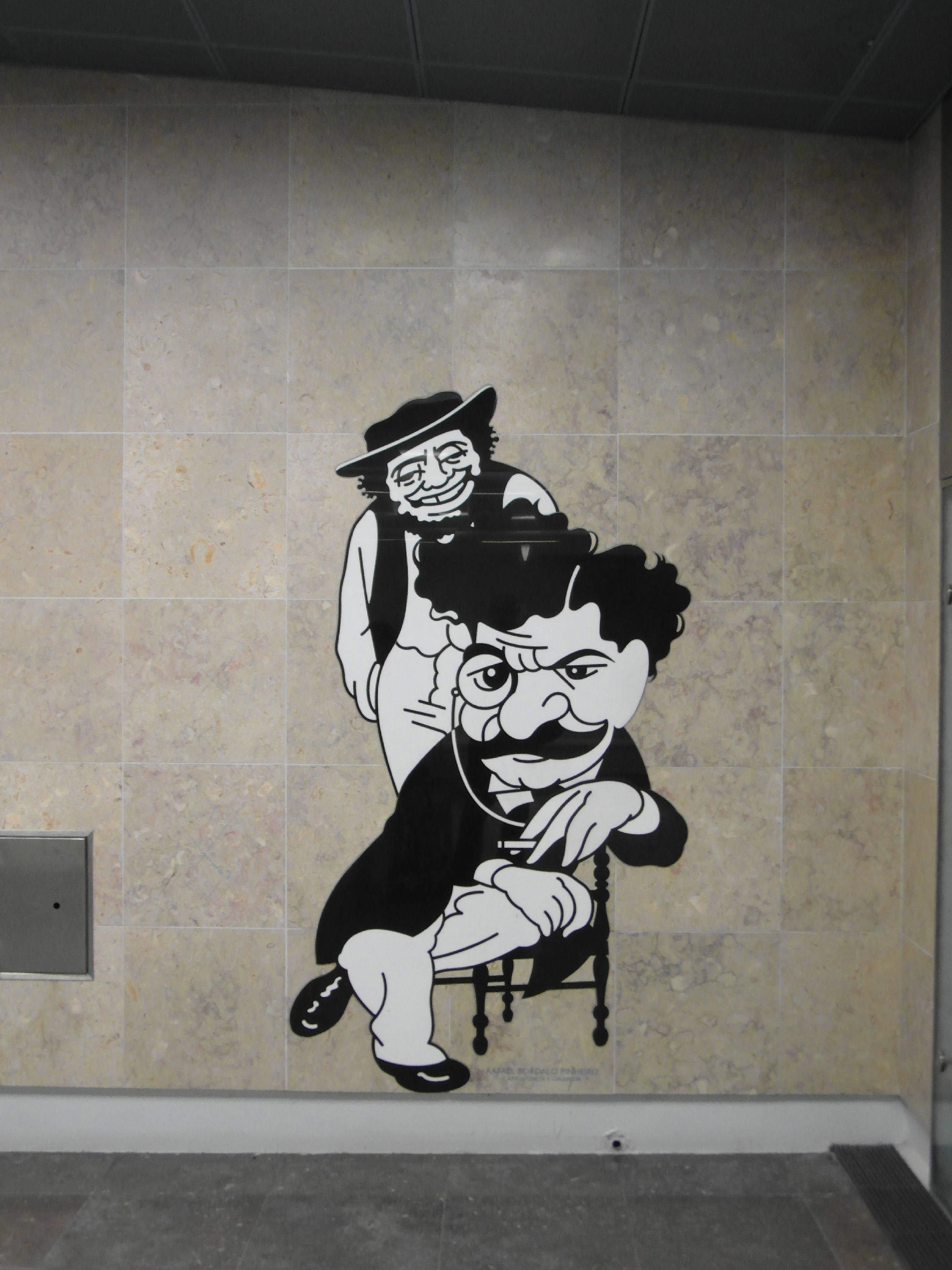
Zé Povinho and his creator caricatured in the Airport Station of the Lisbon Metro, 2012
