= António Rodrigues Sampaio =

Portuguese politician

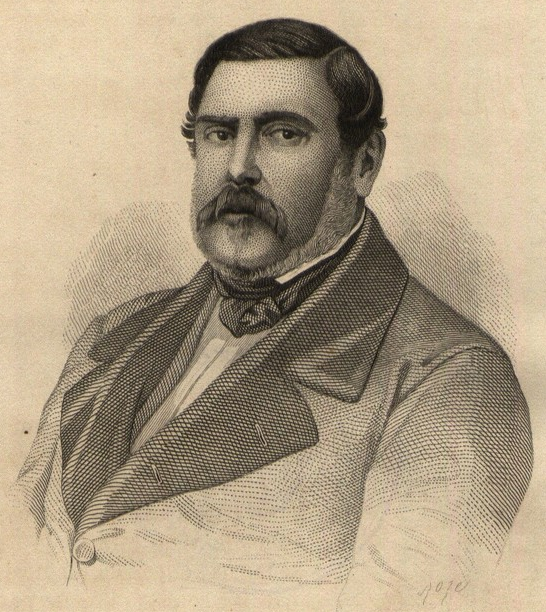

Prime Minister of Portugal
- In office 25 March 1881 – 14 November 1881
- Monarch: Luís
- Preceded by: Anselmo José Braamcamp
- Succeeded by: Fontes Pereira de Melo

Personal details
- Born: 25 July 1806 São Bartolomeu do Mar, Esposende
- Died: 13 September 1882 (aged 76) Sintra

António Rodrigues Sampaio (São Bartolomeu do Mar, Esposende, 25 July 1806 — Sintra, 13 September 1882) was a Portuguese politician and the President of the Council of Ministers from 25 March to 14 November 1881.

Political offices
Preceded by Anselmo José Braamcamp	Prime Minister of Portugal; 1881	Succeeded by Fontes Pereira de Melo
