= José António Duro =

Portuguese poet

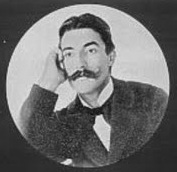
- Born: 22 October 1875; Portalegre, Portugal
- Died: 18 January 1899 (aged 23); Lisbon, Portugal
- Occupation: Poet

José António Duro (22 October 1875 – 18 January 1899) was a Portuguese poet. He was born in Portalegre and attended college in Lisbon. His only work published during his lifetime was Fel.
