= António José de Ávila, 1st Duke of Ávila and Bolama =

Portuguese politician

His Excellency The Duke of Ávila and Bolama
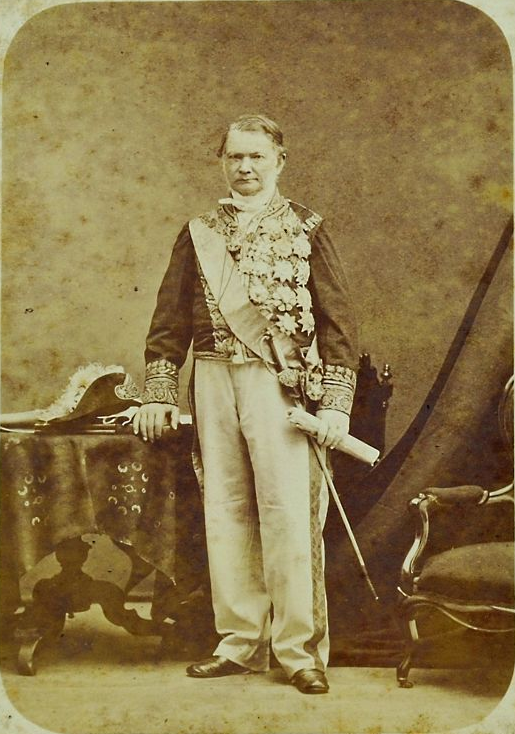
- Portrait by Augusto Bobone

Prime Minister of Portugal
- In office 6 March 1877 – 26 January 1878
- Monarch: Luís
- Preceded by: Fontes Pereira de Melo
- Succeeded by: Fontes Pereira de Melo
- In office 29 October 1870 – 13 September 1871
- Monarch: Luís
- Preceded by: Marquis of Sá da Bandeira
- Succeeded by: Fontes Pereira de Melo
- In office 4 January 1868 – 22 July 1868
- Monarch: Luís
- Preceded by: Joaquim António de Aguiar
- Succeeded by: Marquis of Sá da Bandeira

Personal details
- Born: António José de Ávila; 8 March 1807 Horta, Azores, Portugal
- Died: 3 May 1881 (aged 74) Lisbon, Portugal
- Resting place: Prazeres Cemetery, Prazeres, Lisbon, Portugal
- Party: Independent
- Other political affiliations: Reformist
- Relations: Joaquina Emerenciana (sister; c.1804); Maria do Carmo (sister; c.1815); Manuel José (brother; c.1817)
- Education: University of Coimbra
- Occupation: Politician

António José de Ávila (8 March 1807 – 3 May 1881) was a Portuguese politician, minister of the kingdom, mayor of the city of Horta, on the island of Faial, in the Azores, Civil Governor of the same, Peer-of-the-Realm, Minister of State, and later Ambassador to Spain.

== Biography ==
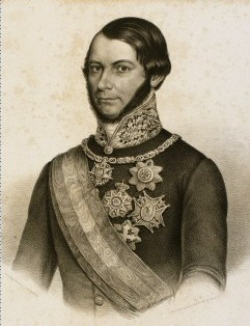
The Duke of Ávila, c. 1850

António José was the son of Manuel José de Ávila, a modest merchant and administrator of the local tithes and his wife, D. Prudenciana Joaquina Cândida da Costa, who lived in a humble home on Rua de Santo Elias.

Of their ten children, only four survived to adulthood: António José was the oldest, his sister Joaquina Emerenciana (born in 1804), Maria do Carmo (born in 1815) and Manuel José (born in 1817). During António José's infancy, the family's economic conditions improved substantially, enough that his father could provide him with sufficient funds to permit him to study off-island: a privilege that only a few families could provide their children.

=== Career ===
After completing his local studies, he traveled to Coimbra to study at the University in 1822, receiving a bachelors degree in Philosophy in 1826. While at Coimbra he also frequented some courses in Mathematics and entered the first year studies in Medicine, but he did not show any particular interest in politics. During the Liberal Wars (1832–34) he returned to Horta (the liberal government-in-exile escaped to the Azores during this period), where he taught for several years before becoming a politician of some success. As mayor through D. Pedro's liberal regency, António José was instrumental in obtaining a new charter, that elevated Horta to the status of city (4 July 1833).

=== Politician ===
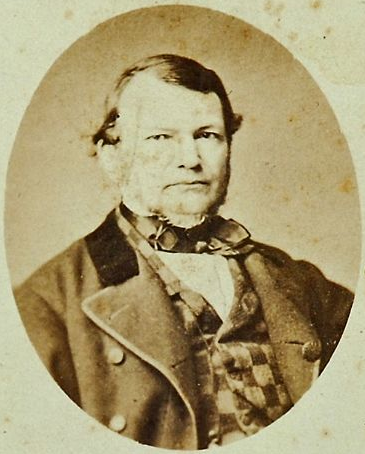
Photograph of the Duke of Ávila, c. 1875-81

After the War (1834), Ávila was elected to the Cortes, beginning an active and uninterrupted career that would last for the next 47 years, in different positions, in parliamentary and governmental roles, as well as a period in the Chamber of Peers (taking on the leadership of the group from the Duke of Loulé, from 1872 until May 1881). He was, as his biographer once wrote: "...one of the more distinct parliamentarians in the history of Portuguese constitutionalism...". In actuality, in the 11 legislatures that he participated, during 27 years (between 1834 and 1861) he participated in 30 commissions in the Chamber of Deputies, and 40 in the Chamber of Peers (between 1861 and 1881); he was involved in 2000 interventions. He did not limit himself to representing the citizens of Horta; during his many years in parliament he represented populations in Évora, Beja, Estremadura, Beira Alta, Chaves, Vila Real and Oliveira de Azeméis.

An excellent orator, untiring worker and astute politician, he was regularly called on to handle governmental functions. Ideologically, Ávila was a conservative within the liberalist ranks, usually referred to as Cartismo, and was in opposition to the progressive wave that appeared as a result of the Septemberist Revolution (September 1836). As the Septemberist movement declined (with the election of the Cartista Joaquim António de Aguiar, in 1841), he was appointed Ministro da Fazenda (English: Minister of Finances) in the cabinet of Joaquim António de Aguiar, at the age of 34, maintaining the post in the governments of Costa Cabral and the Duque da Terceira. In 1857, he resumed the Minister of Commerce post, under the premiership of the Duque de Loulé, after the fall of the Saldanha government.

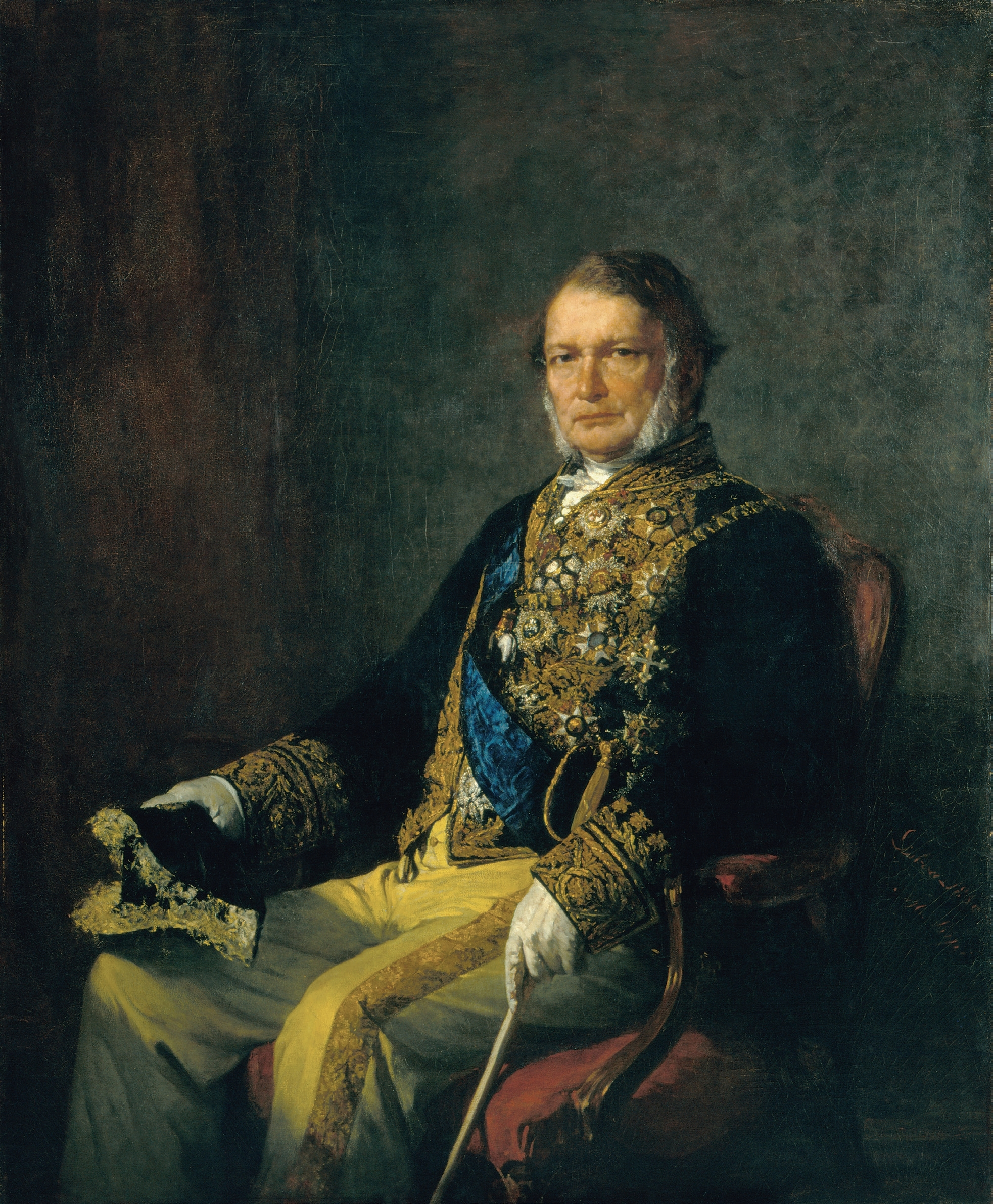
Portrait of the Duke of Ávila and Bolama by Miguel Ângelo Lupi, 1870

He also took on diplomatic responsibilities and administrative posts (such as the Companhia das Lezíras, Campanhia do Crédito Predial, Banco Hipotecário and Banco do Portugal). In 1861, he was appointed as Portugal's representative to the Madrid conference, which aimed to resolve the issue of the island of Bolama. The British occupied the West African island off the coast of modern-day Guinea Bissau, but the ownership of the island was disputed by the Portuguese. The final settlement recognized Portuguese sovereignty on the island. During various governments he exercised roles as: Ministro da Fazenda (English: Minister of Finances), Ministro da Justiça (English: Minister of Justice), Ministro dos Negócios Estrangeiros (English: Minister of Foreign Affairs), Ministro do Reino (English: Minister of the Crown/Kingdom), and Ministro das Obras Públicas (English: Minister of Public Works). In 10 different governments, between 1841 and 1870, he managed 19 different portfolios, and in 1868, 1870, and 1877, he was Prime Minister of Portugal. During his first term (beginning on 4 January 1868) as Prime Minister, he revoked the unpopular tax imposed by the coalition government of Joaquim António de Aguiar, which worsened already existing state financial difficulties and triggered the fall of the government by 22 July. He returned to the Finance portfolio, then Prime Minister, between 29 October 1870 and 13 September 1871, when he replaced Fontes Pereira de Melo. In 1877, owing to public discontent, the Fontes government fell. Ávila was once again invited to form a government, which lasted 10 months until Fontes returned to power.

=== Later life ===
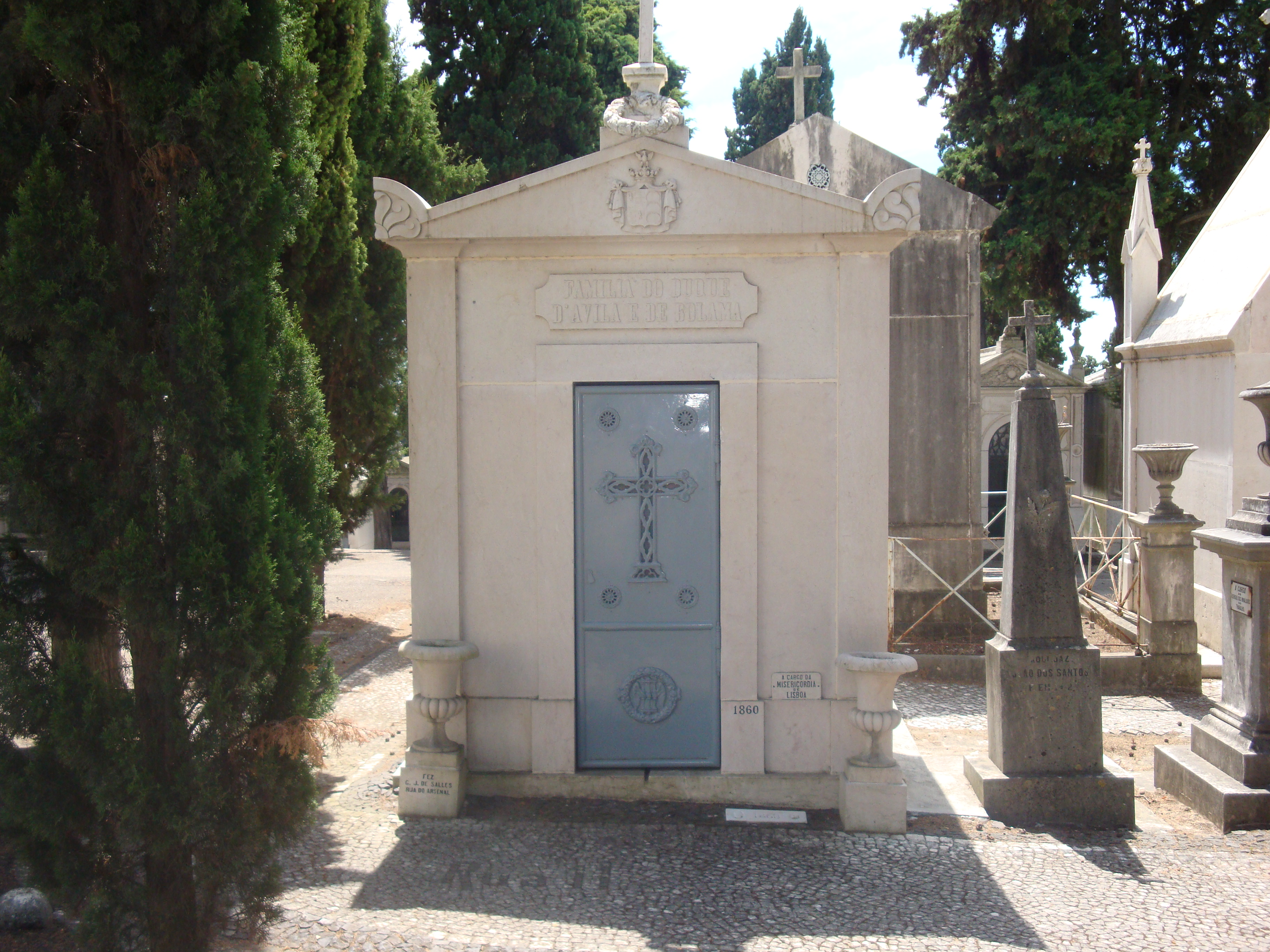
Burial crypt of Ávila family, Prazeres Cemetery, Lisbon

During his long career, he never forgot in his friends and colleagues in Horta and was regularly consulted by administrative and social organizations. As J.M. Sardica later noted:

"the pleb that one day became duke...coming so far, without even a nickname, fortune or special royal favors, rose and became a unique person in the Portuguese constitutional monarchy...through his hands passed a better part of the history of Portugal in the 19th century."

On 13 February 1864, King Luis I of Portugal granted him the title of Conde de Ávila (Count of Ávila) which, six years later, on 24 May 1870, was raised to Marquês de Ávila e Bolama (Marquis of Ávila and Bolama). After another eight years, on 14 May 1878, King Luis raised him still higher to Duque de Ávila e Bolama (Duke of Ávila and Bolama), thus making him the first non-noble-born individual so honored, especially as the title of Duke was, traditionally, granted in Portugal solely to members of high nobility and relatives of the Portuguese Royal Family.

António José de Ávila died in Lisbon eight weeks after his 74th birthday. The Duke's state funeral, which occurred on 5 May 1881, left the Church of the Martyrs around 2:00, and its cortege arrived at the Prazeres Cemertary around 4:00 in the afternoon. Its palm bearers included Fontes e Sampaio, the Duke of Palmela, the Marquis of Ficalho and the Duke of Loulé, who proceeded a group of 500–600 carriages, with more than a thousand people that included representatives of the Royal Family, State bodies, associations and many classes of the society. A coach of the Royal House was provided to transport the body, followed by a carriage with the parish vicar of Martyrs Church and twelve priests. This carriage was also followed by the António José de Ávila's nephew, and another carriage with Ducal crown on a black velvet pillow, followed by the 4th Regimental Cavalry and band. At the cemetery the Duke's body was transported down by Hintze Ribeiro, João Gualberto de Barros e Cunha, Carlos Bento da Silva, António Dias de Oliveira, Reis e Vasconcelos, Carlos Zeferino Pinto Coelho and the Count of Alte. The cortege passed along the packed streets with many of the residents watching from their windows. The Duke had already planned his entombment: "...a small chapel of marble, of a simple architecture, with a small cross..in high relief the coat-of-arms of d'Ávila and Bolama with the Marqueses crown, with the titles 'Family of the Marquis d'Ávila and Bolama'".

== See also ==
- List of prime ministers of Portugal
- List of dukedoms of Portugal
- Dukes of Ávila and Bolama
- Marquis of Ávila and Bolama
- Count of Ávila

Political offices
Preceded by Joaquim António de Aguiar	Prime Minister of Portugal; 1868–1868	Succeeded by Marquis of Sá da Bandeira
Preceded by Marquis of Sá da Bandeira	Prime Minister of Portugal; 1870–1871	Succeeded by Fontes Pereira de Melo
Preceded by Fontes Pereira de Melo	Prime Minister of Portugal; 1877–1878	Succeeded by Fontes Pereira de Melo
Portuguese nobility
New creation	Marquis of Ávila and Bolama; 1870–1881	Succeeded by António José de Ávila
New creation	Duke of Ávila and Bolama; 1878–1881	Succeeded by António José de Ávila
