= Anselmo José Braamcamp =

Portuguese politician

His Excellency Anselmo José Braamcamp GCTE
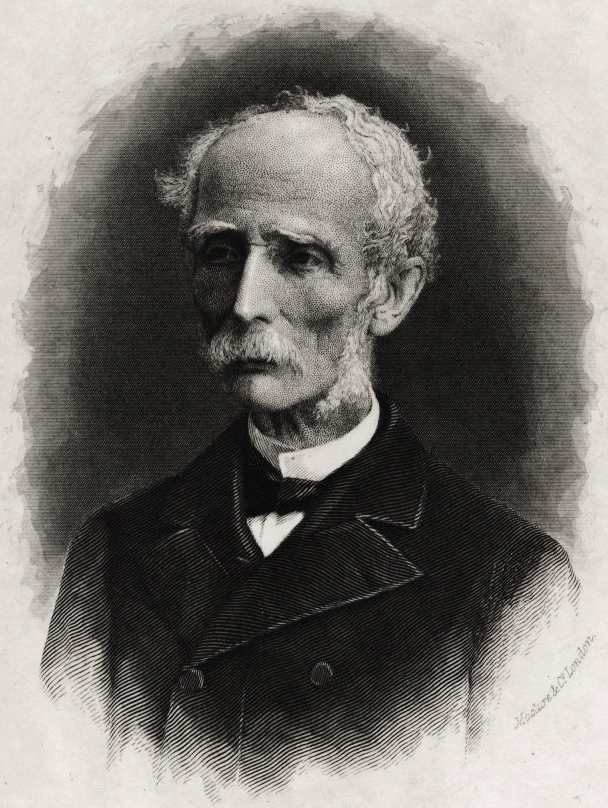

Prime Minister of Portugal
- In office 29 May 1879 – 25 March 1881
- Monarch: Luís
- Preceded by: Fontes Pereira de Melo
- Succeeded by: António Rodrigues Sampaio

Personal details
- Born: 23 October 1817 Lisbon, Portugal
- Died: 13 November 1885 (aged 68) Lisbon, Portugal
- Party: Progressive Party
- Education: University of Coimbra
- Profession: Statesman, Scholar

Anselmo José Braamcamp de Almeida Castelo Branco (23 October 1817 – 13 November 1885) was a Portuguese politician of the Constitutional Monarchy era. He was the leader of the Historic Party (later, the Progressive Party), Minister of the Kingdom, and, between 1879 and 1880, Head of Government (President of the Council of Ministers).

Political offices
Preceded by Fontes Pereira de Melo	Prime Minister of Portugal; 1879–1881	Succeeded by António Rodrigues Sampaio
