= Fontes Pereira de Melo =

Portuguese politician

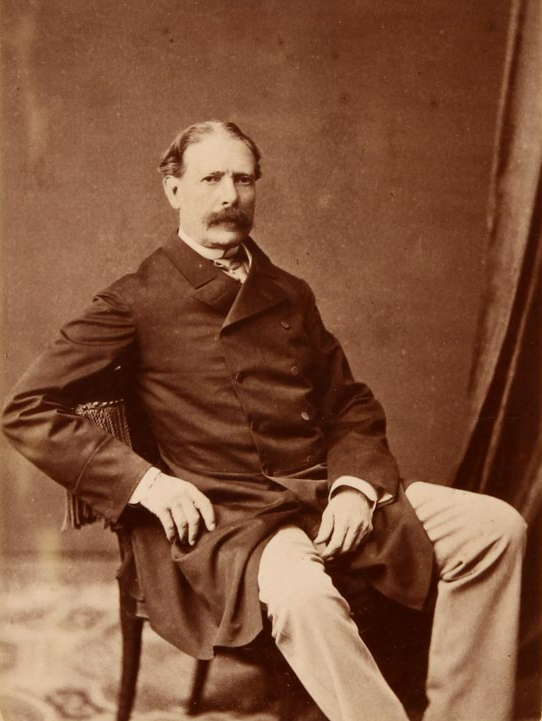
- Portrait by Karl Emil Biel, 1883

Prime Minister of Portugal
- In office 14 November 1881 – 16 February 1886
- Monarch: Luís
- Preceded by: António Rodrigues Sampaio
- Succeeded by: José Luciano de Castro
- In office 26 January 1878 – 29 May 1879
- Monarch: Luís
- Preceded by: Duke of Ávila
- Succeeded by: Anselmo José Braamcamp
- In office 13 September 1871 – 6 March 1877
- Monarch: Luís
- Preceded by: Duke of Ávila
- Succeeded by: Duke of Ávila

Personal details
- Born: 8 September 1819 Lisbon, Portugal
- Died: 22 January 1887 (aged 67) Lisbon, Portugal
- Party: Regenerator Party

António Maria de Fontes Pereira de Melo GCTE KGF (Portuguese pronunciation: [ˈfõtɨʃ pɨˈɾɐjɾɐ ðɨ ˈmɛlu]; Lisbon, 8 September 1819 – 22 January 1887) was a Portuguese statesman and engineer. He was a leading parliamentarian and political figure of his time. Among other posts held, he was six times minister of finance and minister of public works. From 1871 to 1886, he served three times as prime minister of Portugal, for a total of 11 years.

Fontes Pereira de Melo is mostly remembered for implementing dynamic industrial and public infrastructure policy, which became known as Fontismo (after his name). He also implemented educational reforms in accordance with the industrialization process he initiated (see Instituto Industrial de Lisboa and Escola Industrial do Porto).

== Early life ==
Born on 8 September 1819 in Lisbon, António Maria de Fontes Pereira de Melo was the son of João de Fontes Pereira de Melo, a Portuguese Navy officer, later governor of Cape Verde and minister of state, and his wife Jacinta Venância Rosa da Cunha Matos. He was the fourth child of six.

Having not yet reached the age of 14, Fontes joined the Portuguese Royal Naval Academy amid the civil war between absolutists and liberals. Two months later, in October 1833, during the siege of Lisbon by absolutist forces, the young cadet took part in the successful defence of the city led by Napier. In the following three years, he pursued his midshipman training, excelling in mathematics. He graduated in 1837, receiving a prize for students of exceptional merit that had only been awarded twice in twenty years.

In 1836, wishing to pursue more advanced studies, Fontes enrolled in the three-year course of military engineering at the School of the Army. He graduated as lieutenant of the Royal Corps of Engineers in 1839.

In the same year, an appointed aide to his father, then governor of Cape Verde, Fontes moved to the territory, where he resided until 1842, producing reports and maps and working on various projects. At the age of 21, Fontes married Maria Josefa de Sousa, daughter of an influential merchant of Cape Verde. On his return to Lisbon, he attended the astronomy course at the Polytechnic School, but his studies were interrupted by a personal tragedy, the death of his wife and, soon after, of his only daughter. He would not marry again.

After the end of the civil war and the triumph of the liberals, the country remained mired in political and military instability. In December 1846, during the Patuleia revolt, the Duke of Saldanha decided to confront the advancing revolutionary troops in Torres Vedras. Saldanha commissioned Fontes, an engineering officer on his staff, to conduct the reconnaissance of the battlefield. After the victory of the government troops, the mission earned Fontes the Tower and Sword cross and recognition as the marshal-duke.

In 1848, while Saldanha was head of government, and after his father had a short stint as navy and overseas minister, Fontes ran for parliament for the constituency of Cape Verde. The constituency had a very small electorate and was controlled by the family to which he had become connected through marriage. His election was initially rejected by a parliamentary committee dominated by opposition members, but after much dispute finally approved.

== President of the Council of Ministers ==
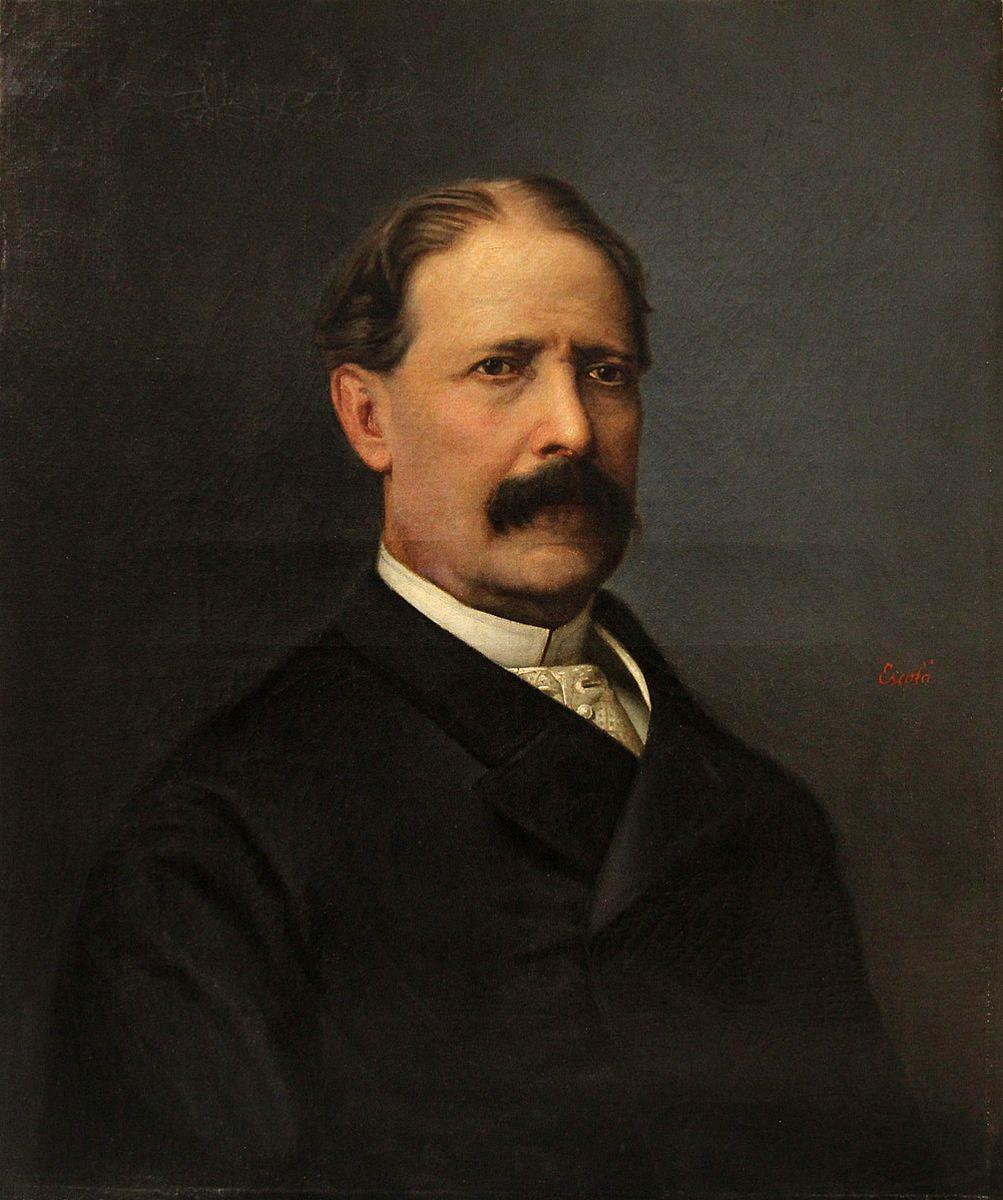
Fontes Pereira de Melo in 1881, when he was the third president of the Council of Ministers

He ran for the Regenerator Party starting in 1850. He later became prime minister for the first term on 13 September 1871. The government reconstituted the country after the January Revolution and a few governments, entirely disorganized. He succeeded and was later succeeded by Marquess of Ávila He left in 1877 after the banking crisis in 1876. A year later after the 1878 elections, he was again prime minister after his electoral victory. A year later, he asked to be dismissed from the cabinet and he left office and Anselmo José Braamcamp organized that cabinet.

In 1880, he was president of the Central Commission of 1 December 1640 In 1881, he was given the presidency of the Chamber of Peers after the death of the Duke of Ávila and Bolama. Later, on 11 November, Fontes was preparing to create a new government. That new government had a principal mission: modify the state's constitution for the new Additional Act to the Constitutional Chart which was promulgated in 1885, which transformed the Chamber of Peers of hereditary in life. The organization of military reforms made by himself included new regiments in the infantry, two in the cavalry, and artillery, later he started to buy more torpedo boats. He left the government on 16 February 1886. After finishing his third and last term, he was succeeded by José Luciano de Castro.

== Death ==
In 1887, he was preparing for a new opposition campaign over the cabinet and actively directed the electoral works, Pereira de Melo suffered an illness and died on 22 January 1887 at the palace at 6 Páteo do Tijolo in Mercês, Lisbon where he lived.

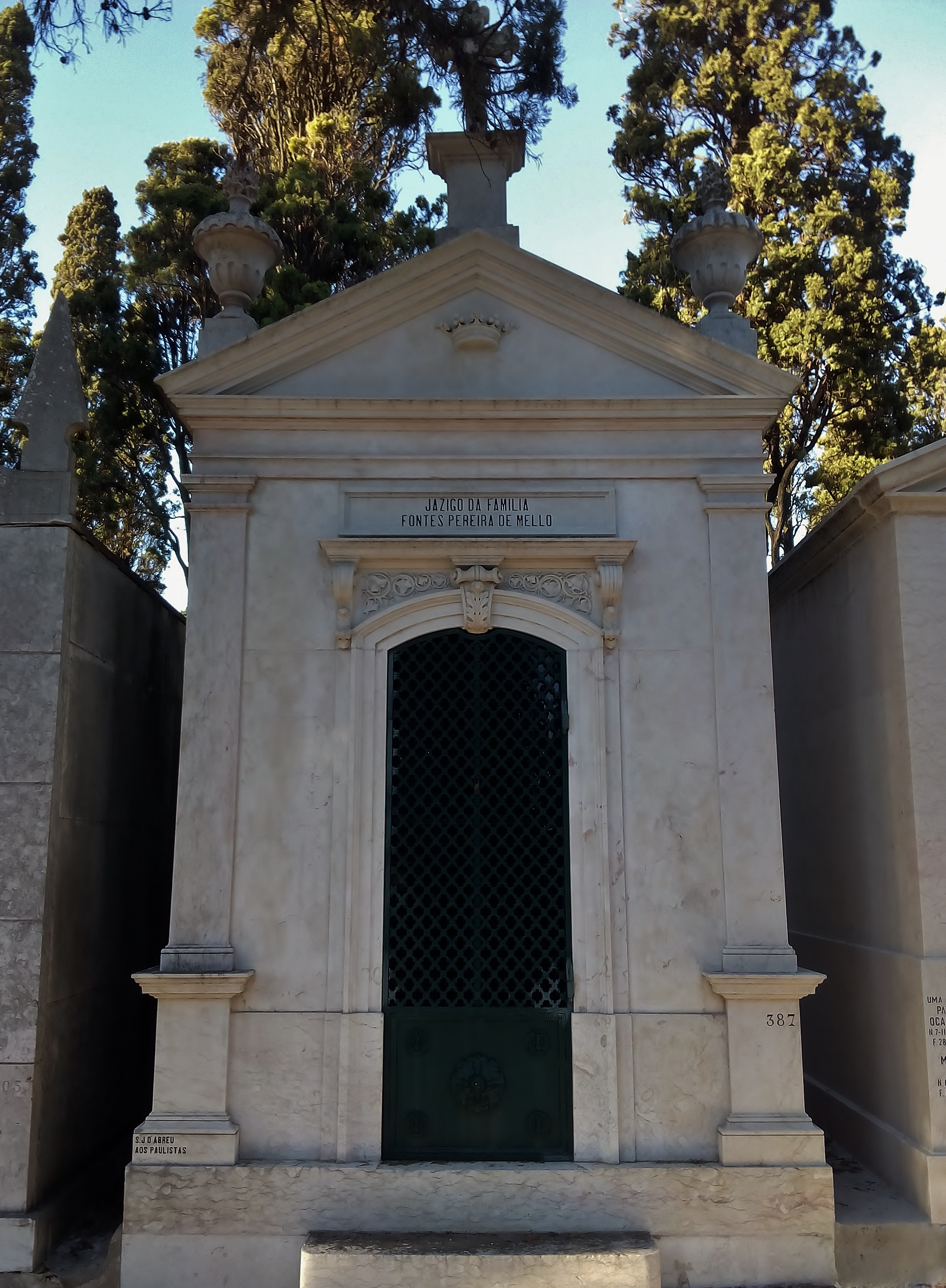
Tomb of the Fontes Pereira de Melo family at Prazeres Cemetery

== Family ==
His younger sister, Maria Henriqueta de Fontes Pereira de Melo, wife of Vicente Rodrigues Ganhado, was granted the noble title of 1st Marchioness of Fontes Pereira de Melo.

== Legacy ==
The Fontes Pereira de Melo Lighthouse in the easternmost point of the island of Santo Antão in northwestern Cape Verde was named for him, it was first constructed when he was prime minister in his later years and was completed in the year that he was no longer prime minister. Now it is called the Ponta do Tumbo Lighthouse.

== See also ==
- History of Portugal
- Portugal

Political offices
Preceded by Duke of Ávila	Prime Minister of Portugal; 1871–1877	Succeeded by Duke of Ávila
Preceded by Duke of Ávila	Prime Minister of Portugal; 1878–1879	Succeeded by Anselmo José Braamcamp
Preceded by António Rodrigues Sampaio	Prime Minister of Portugal; 1881–1886	Succeeded by Luciano de Castro
