= Luís I of Portugal =

King of Portugal from 1861 to 1889

Luís I
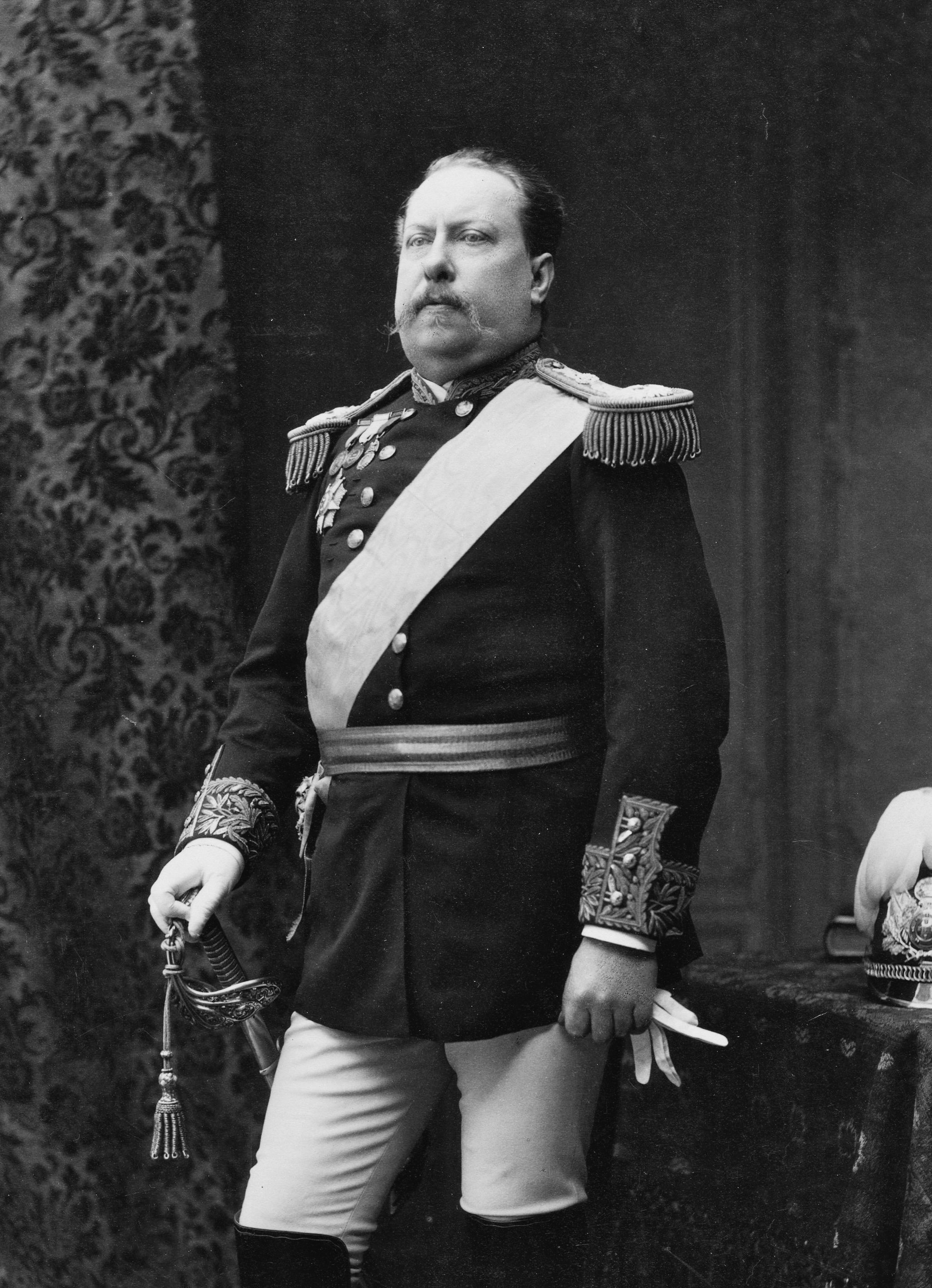
- Portrait, 1886

King of Portugal
- Reign: 11 November 1861 – 19 October 1889
- Acclamation: 22 December 1861
- Predecessor: Pedro V
- Successor: Carlos I
- Prime Ministers: See list: The Duke of Loulé The Marquis of Sá da Bandeira Joaquim António de Aguiar The Duke of Ávila and Bolama The Duke of Saldanha Fontes Pereira de Melo Anselmo José Braamcamp António Rodrigues Sampaio José Luciano de Castro
- Born: 31 October 1838; Necessidades Palace, Lisbon, Portugal
- Died: 19 October 1889 (aged 50); Citadel Palace, Cascais, Portugal
- Burial: Pantheon of the Braganzas
- Spouse: Maria Pia of Savoy (m. 1862)
- Issue: Carlos I of Portugal; Infante Afonso, Duke of Porto
Names
- Luís Filipe Maria Fernando Pedro de Alcântara António Miguel Rafael Gabriel Gonzaga Xavier Francisco de Assis João Augusto Júlio Valfando
- House: Braganza (Note: "While remaining patrilineal dynasts of the House of Saxe-Coburg and Gotha according to pp. 88, 116 of the 1944 Almanach de Gotha, Title 1, Chapter 1, Article 5 of the 1838 Portuguese constitution declared, with respect to Ferdinand II of Portugal's issue by his first wife, that 'the Most Serene House of Braganza is the reigning house of Portugal and continues through the Person of the Lady Queen Maria II'. Thus their mutual descendants constitute the Coburg line of the House of Braganza".)
- Father: Ferdinand II of Portugal
- Mother: Maria II of Portugal

Dom Luís I (Anglicized: Louis I, Luís Filipe Maria Fernando Pedro de Alcântara António Miguel Rafael Gabriel Gonzaga Xavier Francisco de Assis João Augusto Júlio Valfando; 31 October 1838 – 19 October 1889), known as "the Popular" (Portuguese: o Popular) was King of Portugal from 1861 to 1889.

Luís was a member of the ruling House of Braganza. The second son of Queen Maria II and her consort, King Ferdinand II, and born as the Duke of Porto, he acceded to the throne upon the death of his elder brother King Pedro V.

== Infante of Portugal ==
Prince Luís was born on 31 October 1838, at 11.30pm. Although his status as second son did not suggest that Luís would ascend to the Portuguese throne, his education was meticulous and largely shared with his older brother, the Royal Prince Pedro: he was tutored by the counsellor Carl Andreas Dietz, who had been his father Fernando's preceptor until April 1847, when Dietz was forced to leave Portugal on charges of meddling in national politics associated with his Protestant religious affiliation, and was replaced by the Viscount of Carreira, assisted by Manuel Moreira Coelho.

Pedro and Luís divided their time between the palaces of Mafra, Sintra and Vila Viçosa, as well as sporadic stays at the Palace of Belém.

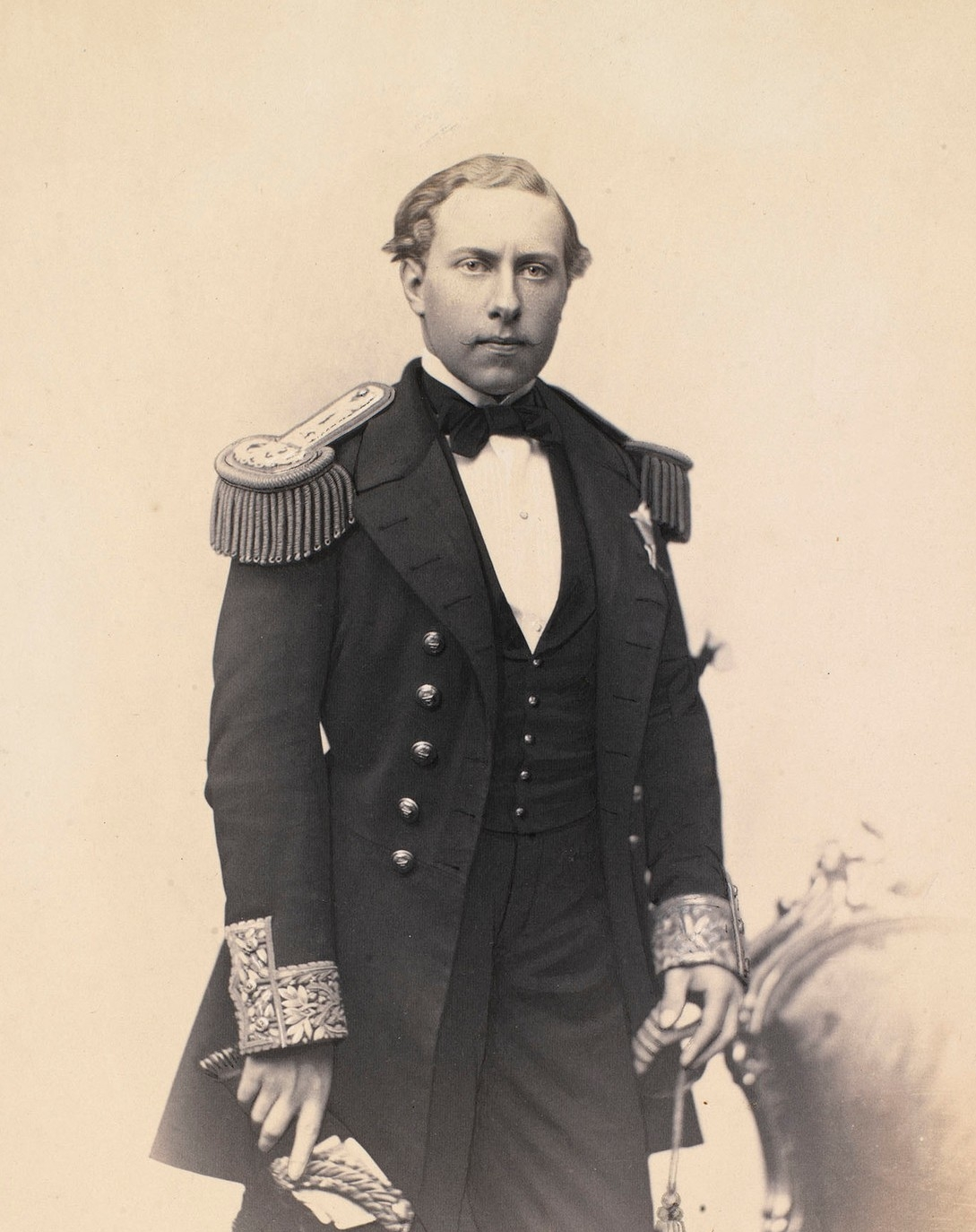
Luís, as Duke of Porto and Infante of Portugal, 1861

As the second-born son of the royal couple, Luís embarked on a naval career, having been appointed private in the Company of the Marine Guards and recognized in a ceremony at the Navy Arsenal on 28 October 1846, when he was only 8 years old. He would be promoted successively to second lieutenant (1851), lieutenant captain (1854), frigate captain (1858) and sea captain (1859). He had his first naval command in September 1857, on the brig Pedro Nunes, in which he made a cruise off the coast of Portugal and a trip to Gibraltar. He was appointed, by his brother King Pedro V, commander of the corvette Bartolomeu Dias, on 21 June 1858. Commanding the Bartolomeu Dias, he completed nine service missions between 1858 and 1860: he led the expedition to the archipelagos of Madeira and the Azores; he was responsible for transporting Prince George of Saxony to Lisbon, where he married Infanta Maria Ana, his sister; took the couple to England; traveled to Tangier; and, in 1860, Angola; he went to Madeira again on the orders of Empress Elisabeth of Austria; and brought Prince Leopold of Hohenzollern-Sigmaringen from Southampton, for his wedding with Infanta Antonia, then took the bride and groom to Anvers.

== Reign ==
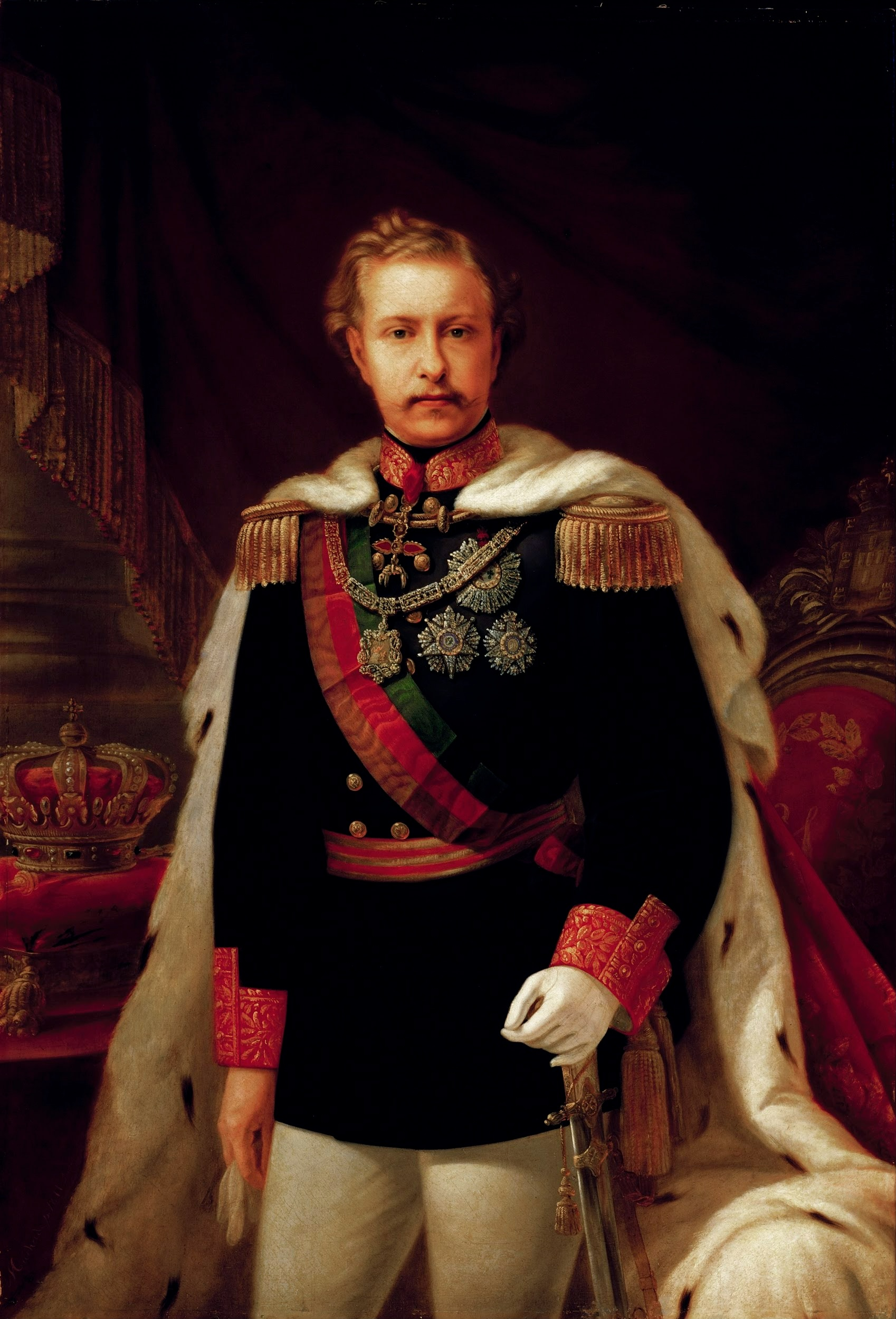
Royal portrait of king Luís I, 1871

D. Luís inherited the crown in November 1861, succeeding his brother Pedro V as he left no descendants, and was acclaimed king on 22 December of the same year. On 27 September of the following year, he married Maria Pia of Savoy, daughter of King Victor Emanuel II of Italy, by proxy.

=== Renouncing Spanish throne ===
After the Glorious Revolution deposed Isabel II of Spain in September 1868, the new Cortes began the task of searching for a suitable liberal-leaning candidate from a new dynasty to replace her.

In 1869, Luís I made it public that he did not want to be monarch of Spain and made a point of making that clear both to the Council of Ministers, chaired by the Duke of Loulé, and to the Portuguese people. Two days after his patriotic letter appeared in the Government's gazette, it was published in the Diário de Notícias, thus serving the Royal House to deny the rumour that there would be an abdication: "I was born Portuguese, Portuguese I want to die," proclaimed Luís on the front page of the newspaper on 28 September 1869. If Luís accepted the Spanish crown, he would have to abdicate in Portugal to Carlos, his son of only 6 years, with Ferdinand II as regent, opening up the possibility of an Iberian Union in the medium term. After Luís refused, the Spanish throne was handed over to his brother-in-law, Amadeu of Savoy.

=== Government instability ===
During his reign, and as a result of the creation of the general consumption tax, which was poorly received by public opinion, a riot called Janeirinha broke out (at the end of 1867). There was also a military revolt on 19 May 1870, promoted by Marshal Duke of Saldanha, who wanted the government to resign. The monarch responded to the 19 May revolt on 29 August by dismissing Saldanha's ministry and calling Sá da Bandeira to power.

In September 1871, Fontes Pereira de Melo came to power and organised a regenerative cabinet, which remained in power until 1877. This was followed by the Duke of Ávila, who couldn't hold on for long because he lacked a majority. Thus, after the parliamentary conflict that broke out in 1878, Fontes was called back to form a cabinet. As a result, the progressives accused the king of scandalously patronising the regenerators. This episode encouraged the development of republicanism. In 1879, King Luís called on the progressives to form a government.

These series of transitional governments was called Rotativism. The governments at various times were composed by the Progressistas (Liberals) and the Regeneradores (Conservatives), the party generally favoured by King Luís, who secured their long term in office after 1881.

It was during the reign of King Luís I that some of Portugal's political parties were founded: the Reformist Party (1865), which came to power in 1868, the Portuguese Socialist Party (1875), under the name of the Socialist Workers' Party, and the Progressive Party (1876), which came to power in 1879. In 1883, the Congress of the Organising Committee of the Portuguese Republican Party was held. By the end of his reign, the Republican Party was already a perfectly structured political force.

=== Culture ===
During his time, the Coimbrã Question (1865–1866) arose and the Casino Conferences (1871) took place, to which the names of Antero de Quental and Eça de Queiroz were linked, the exponents of a generation that became notable in Portuguese intellectual life. At the time these young intellectuals reacted against romantic degeneracy and the country's cultural, educational, technological and economic backwardness.

=== Colonial affairs ===
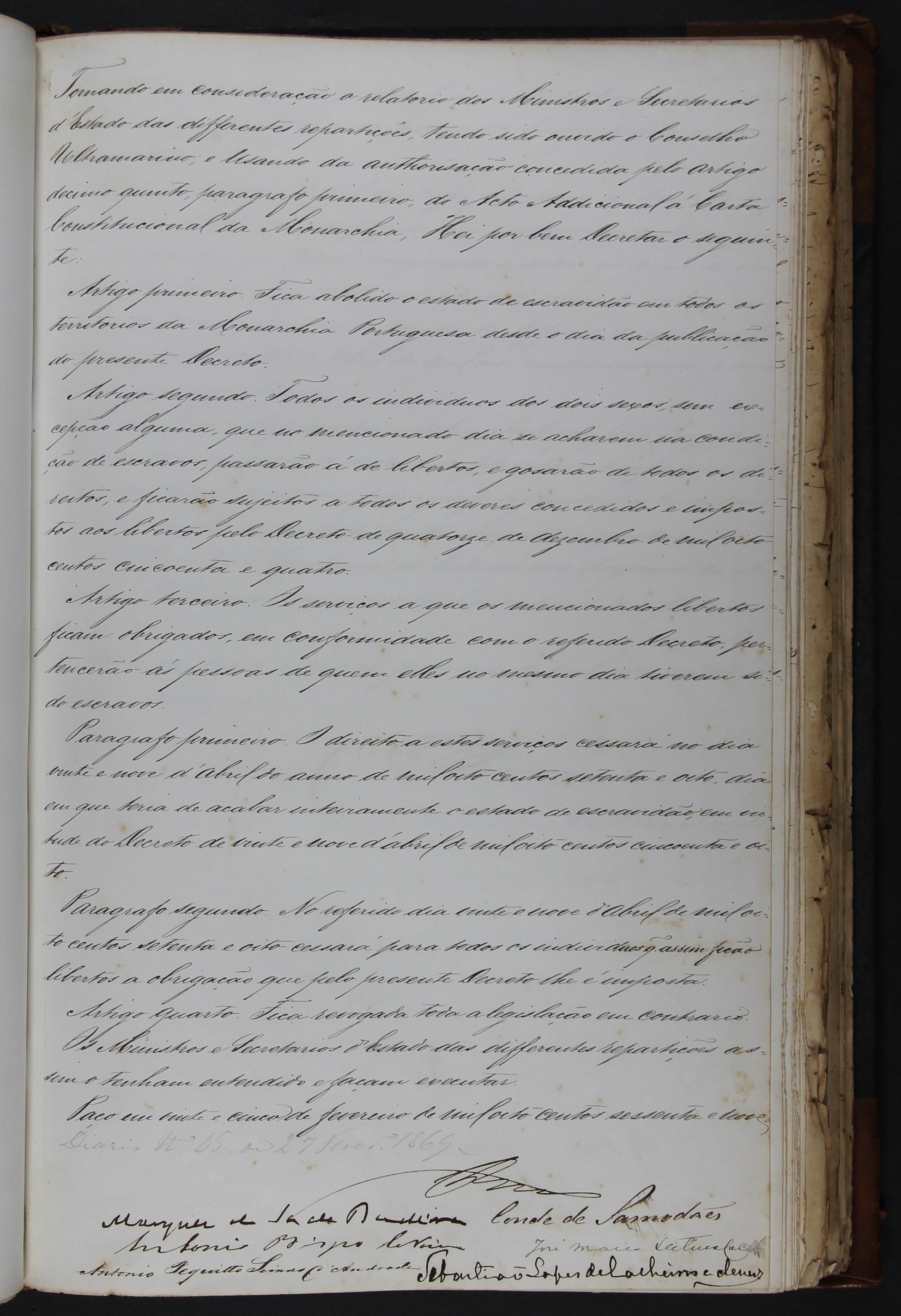
1861 decree which abolished slavery in the Portuguese empire

In 1884, the Berlin Conference took place, resulting in the so-called Pink Map, which defined the division of Africa between the great colonial powers: the German Empire, Belgium, France, the United Kingdom and the Kingdom of Portugal.

During his reign, Delagoa Bay was confirmed as a Portuguese possession in 1875, whilst Belgian activities in the Congo and the 1890 British Ultimatum prevented the Portuguese from colonizing modern-day Zambia and Zimbabwe in order to establish a link between Portuguese Angola and Portuguese Mozambique at the peak of the Scramble for Africa.

=== Political style and achievements ===
With a calm and conciliatory temperament, he was a model constitutional monarch, scrupulously respectful of public freedoms. Of particular note during his reign was the start of work on the ports of Lisbon and Leixões, the extension of the road and railway network, the construction of the Crystal Palace in Porto, the abolition of the death penalty for civil offences, the abolition of slavery in the Portuguese empire and the publication of the first civil code.

=== Philanthropy ===
Luís followed in the footsteps of his mother, Maria II, by having cultural associations built and founded. On 1 June 1871, Luís was in Seixal (a town founded by his mother) to witness the founding of the Sociedade Filarmónica União Seixalense. On the same day, the Franco-Prussian War ended.

== Personal interests ==
With great artistic sensitivity, he painted, composed and played the cello and piano. A polyglot, he spoke some European languages correctly, and enjoyed writing vernacular poetry. He made translations of works by William Shakespeare, such as The Merchant of Venice, Richard III and Othello, the Moor of Venice. His best-known work in Portugal was his translation of Hamlet.

Luís was also a man of science, with a passion for oceanography. He invested a large part of his fortune in financing scientific projects and oceanographic research vessels, which travelled the oceans in search of specimens. He successfully practised photography.

== Marriage and descendants ==
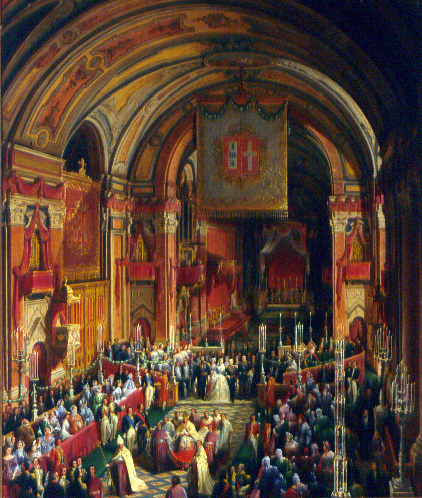
Ratification of the marriage of Luís I and Maria Pia

In June 1862, Luís asked Archduchess Maria Theresa of Austria (1845–1927), a daughter of Archduke Albert, Duke of Teschen and Princess Hildegard of Bavaria, to marry him in a letter sent to her father. It was urgent for him to get married as his older brother, King Pedro V, had died in November 1861, without issue and two of his younger brothers, João and Fernando, followed him shortly after, which left the Braganza dynasty almost without heirs. Luís had already selected a number of brides including Princess Marie of Hohenzollern-Sigmaringen (1845–1912), sister of his late sister-in-law Stephanie, Duchess Sophie Charlotte in Bavaria (1847–1897), Princess Maria Pia of Savoy (1847–1911) and also considered some Austrian archduchesses, Maria Theresa being one of them, but didn't know which one to choose. So he sent letters to his cousin, Queen Victoria, and his great-uncle, King Leopold I of Belgium, to ask for their advice. Both agreed that the best choice was Maria Theresa. Thus, King Luís sent his letter. However, his wish was not fulfilled as her father, Archduke Albert, thought she was too young at the time (she was one month away from turning 17) and needed to finish her education. Two weeks after, Luís asked for the hand of Princess Maria Pia of Savoy and, this time, was accepted, even though Maria Pia, born in 1847, was even younger than Maria Theresa.

Luís married Maria Pia, the daughter of Victor Emmanuel II of Italy and Adelaide of Austria, on 6 October 1862. They both had a deep love at first, but Luís's countless mistresses led Maria Pia to depression. Together they had two sons:

- Dom Carlos, Prince Royal of Portugal (28 September 1863 – 1 February 1908), successor as King Carlos I; murdered by the Carbonária.
- Dom Afonso, Prince Royal of Portugal (31 July 1865 – 21 February 1920), Infante of Portugal, Duke of Porto, Viceroy of India, and after 1908 Prince Royal.

== Illness and death ==
Luís was a lifelong womanizer. He had a series of extra-marital affairs, the more notorious one with actress Rosa Damasceno. Queen Maria Pia was displeased at first, but later tolerated her husband's infidelities.

Sometime in his adult life, Luís contracted syphilis. The infection remained dormant for several years but in 1887 it became persistently manifest, taking its toll. Within two years it had evolved to neurosyphilis, killing him after prolonged and excruciating suffering, on 19 October 1889, at 11:00 a.m.

== Honours ==
He received the following orders:

- Austria: Grand Cross of the Royal Hungarian Order of St. Stephen, 1854
- Baden:
  - Knight of the House Order of Fidelity, 1885
  - Knight of the Order of Berthold the First, 1885
- Bavaria: Knight of St. Hubert, 1867
- Belgium:
  - Order of Leoopold (Grand Cordon) (Belgium) , 9 July 1854
- Brazil:
  - National Order of the Southern Cross (Grand Collar) (Note: Portuguese: Ordem Nacional do Cruzeiro do Sul – Grande Colar) (Brazil) , 1861
  - Grand Cross of the Rose, with Collar
  - Grand Cross of the Order of Pedro I, with Collar
- Denmark: Knight of the Elephant, 18 April 1864
- (Saxe-Coburg and Gotha) (Duchy of Saxe-Altenburg) (Saxe-Meiningen) Ernestine duchies: Grand Cross of the Saxe-Ernestine House Order, 1854
- France:
  - Legion of Honour (Grand Cross) (Note: French: Légion d'honneur - Grand-croix) (France)
  - Military Medal
- Greece: Grand Cross of the Redeemer
- Hanover:
  - Knight of St. George, 1861
  - Grand Cross of the Royal Guelphic Order
- Hawaii: Grand Cross of the Order of Kamehameha I, 19 August 1881
- Hesse and by Rhine: Grand Cross of the Ludwig Order, 7 December 1865
- Japan: Grand Cordon of the Order of the Chrysanthemum, 20 April 1883
- Liberia: Grand Cross of the Order of African Redemption
- Mecklenburg: Grand Cross of the Wendish Crown, with Crown in Ore and Collar
- Mexico: Grand Cross of the Mexican Eagle, with Collar, 1865
- Monaco: Grand Cross of St. Charles
- Netherlands: Grand Cross of the Netherlands Lion
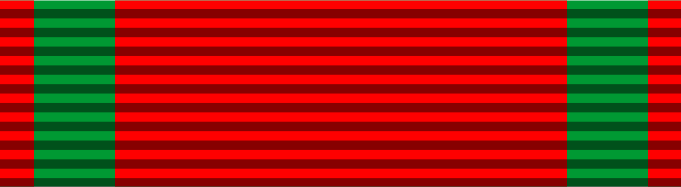
- Ottoman Empire: Order of the Medjidie (Class I: Gold) (Note: Presented by the Sultan) (Ottoman Empire) , 1st Class in Diamonds
- Tunisia: Grand Cordon of the Order of Glory, in Diamonds
- Prussia: Knight of the Black Eagle, 24 July 1854; with Collar, 1862
- Romania:
  - Grand Cross of the Crown of Romania
  - Grand Cross of the Star of Romania
- Russia:
  - Knight of St. Andrew, with Collar
  - Knight of St. Alexander Nevsky
  - Knight of the White Eagle
  - Knight of St. Anna, 1st Class
- San Marino: Grand Cross of San Marino
- Sardinia:
  - Knight of the Annunciation, 15 July 1855
  - Grand Cross of Saints Maurice and Lazarus, 15 July 1855
- Sovereign Military Order of Malta: Bailiff Grand Cross of Honour and Devotion
- Saxe-Weimar-Eisenach: Grand Cross of the White Falcon, 1 August 1854
- (Kingdom of Saxony) Saxony: Knight of the Rue Crown, 1854
- Serbia: Grand Cross of the Cross of Takovo
- (Thailand) Siam: Knight of the Nine Gems
- Spain:
  - Knight of the Golden Fleece, 28 November 1861
  - Grand Cross of Naval Merit, with Red Decoration, 1877
  - Grand Cross of the Military Order of St. Ferdinand
  - Grand Cross of Military Merit
- Sweden-Norway:
  - Knight of the Seraphim, 27 November 1861
  - Grand Cross of St. Olav, 28 December 1872
- United Kingdom: Stranger Knight of the Garter, 17 June 1865
- Württemberg: Grand Cross of the Württemberg Crown, 1865

== Ancestry ==
Ancestors of Luís I of Portugal

8. Francis, Duke of Saxe-Coburg-Saalfeld
4. Prince Ferdinand of Saxe-Coburg and Gotha
9. Countess Augusta Reuss of Ebersdorf
2. Fernando II of Portugal
10. Ferenc József, Prince Koháry de Csábrág et Szitnya
5. Princess Mária Antónia Koháry de Csábrág et Szitnya
11. Countess Maria Antonia von Waldstein zu Wartenberg
1. Luís I of Portugal
12. João VI of Portugal
6. Pedro I of Brazil and IV of Portugal
13. Infanta Carlota Joaquina of Spain
3. Maria II of Portugal
14. Francis II, Holy Roman Emperor
7. Archduchess Leopoldina of Austria
15. Princess Maria Theresa of Naples and Sicily

== Notes ==
Luís I of Portugal House of Braganza Cadet branch of the House of Aviz Born: 31 October 1838 Died: 19 October 1889
Regnal titles
Preceded by Pedro V	King of Portugal; 1861–1889	Succeeded by Carlos I
Portuguese royalty
Preceded by Maria II	Duke of Porto; 1838–1861	Succeeded by Afonso Henriques
