= 1842 Portuguese legislative election =

← 1840	5 and 19 June 1842	1845 →

All 145 seats in the Chamber of Deputies 73 seats needed for a majority
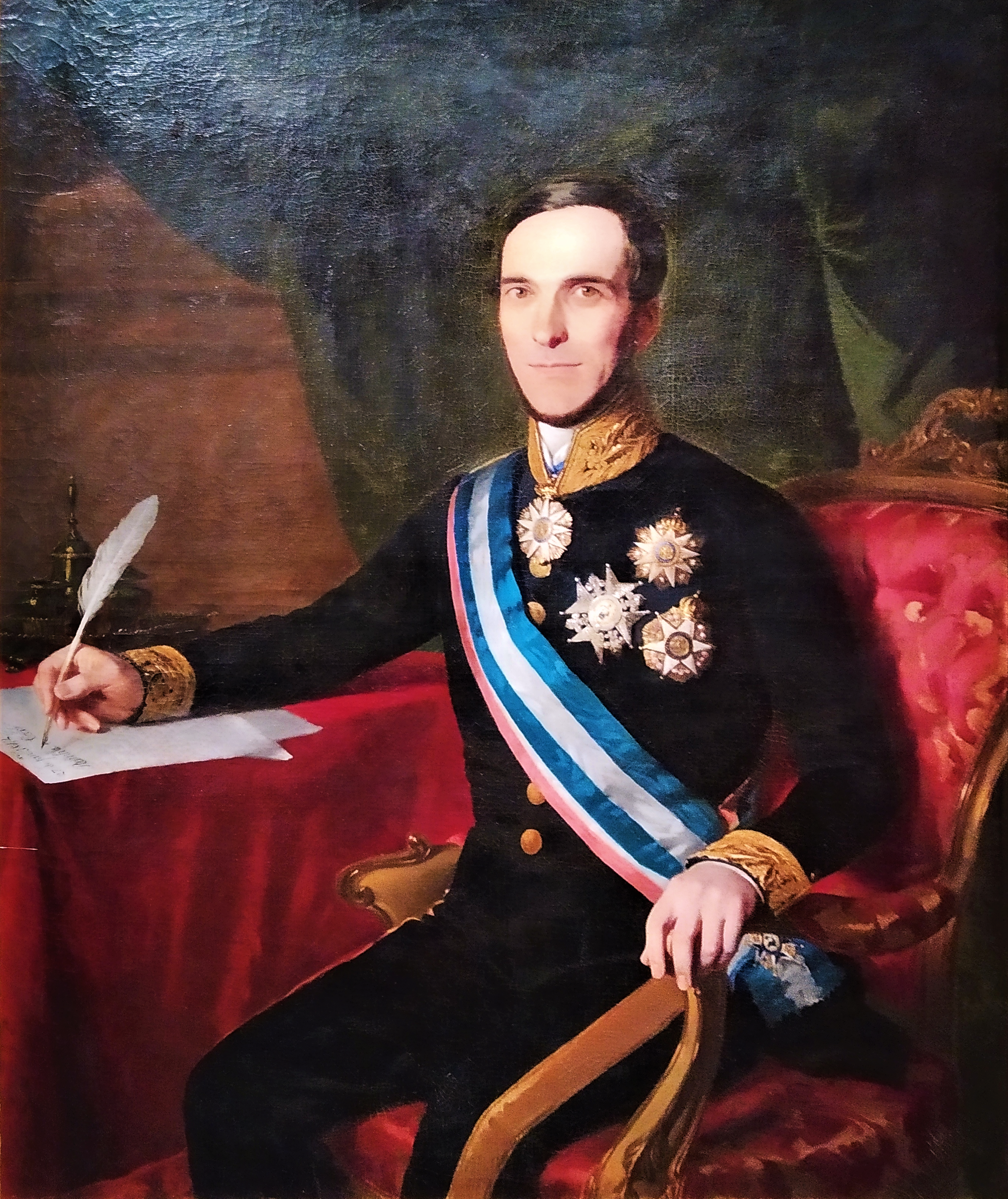

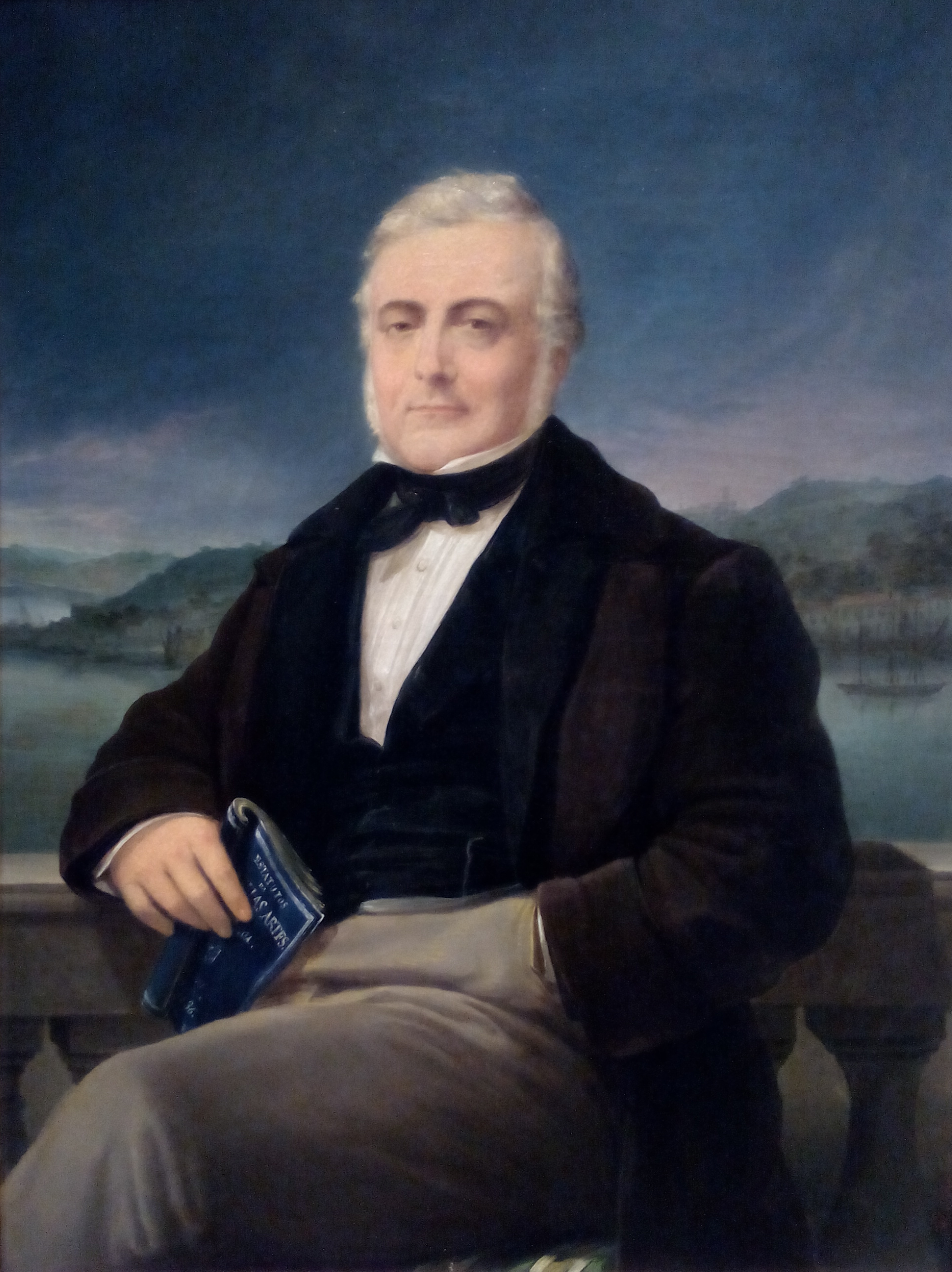
	First party	Second party
Leader	Costa Cabral	Passos Manuel
Party	Cartista	Septembrist
Seats won	72	10
Prime Minister before election
1st Duke of Terceira
Cartista
Elected Prime Minister
1st Duke of Terceira
Cartista

Parliamentary elections were held in Portugal on 5 and 19 June 1842.

== Electoral system ==
Prior to the elections the Constitutional Charter of 1826 was reintroduced on 10 February, having previously been in force from 1826 to 1828 and again from 1834 until 1836. The direct electoral system used in 1838 and 1840 was replaced by an indirect system in which voters elected provincial assemblies, who in turn elected members of the Chamber of Deputies; the appointed Chamber of Most Worthy Peers replaced the elected Senate as the upper house.

The 145 members of the Chamber of Deputies were elected from multi-member constituencies, with 119 representing the mainland, 12 representing islands and 14 representing overseas colonies.

== Campaign ==
On 30 March the Miguelistas and Setembristas formed a united front under the name 'Broad Coalition'. The Cartistas released a manifesto on 3 June, which was critical of Minister and Secretary for Royal State Affairs Costa Cabral.

== Results ==
When the Cortes Gerais met for the first time on 10 July the government was supported by 72 Cabralista deputies, with only 10 deputies representing the Setembristas, Miguelistas and anti-Cabralistas.

Party	Seats
Cartistas	72
Septembrists	10
Others	63
Total	145
Source: ISCSP
