= António Luís de Seabra, 1st Viscount of Seabra =

Portuguese judge, lawyer and politician

His Lordship The Viscount of Seabra ComC
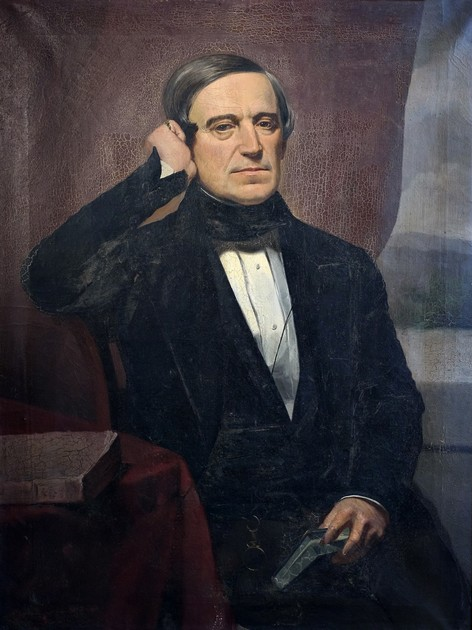

Minister and Secretary of State of Ecclesiastical Affairs and Justice
- In office 4 January 1868 – 22 July 1868
- Monarch: Luís I of Portugal
- Preceded by: Augusto César Barjona de Freitas
- Succeeded by: António Pequito Seixas de Andrade
- In office 4 March 1852 – 19 August 1852
- Monarch: Maria II of Portugal
- Preceded by: Joaquim Filipe de Soure
- Succeeded by: Frederico Guilherme da Silva Pereira

Personal details
- Born: 2 December 1798 Atlantic Ocean (Note: Seabra was born off the coast of Cape Verde, on board the vessel Santa Cruz, en route to Rio de Janeiro, State of Brazil. He was baptized in Rio de Janeiro.)
- Died: 19 January 1895 (aged 96) Mogofores, Anadia, Portugal
- Occupation: Politician

D. António Luís de Seabra e Sousa, 1st Viscount of Seabra (2 December 1798 – 19 January 1895) was a Portuguese politician, jurist, and magistrate. A notable figure of the Constitutional Monarchy period, he was a government minister, a rector of the University of Coimbra, a judge in the Oporto appellate court, a member of Parliament, a Peer of the Realm, and a judge of the Supreme Court of Justice.

The Viscount of Seabra is best known as the author of the first Portuguese Civil Code, in 1867, which remained in force for a full century; the original Code is still generally referred to as "the Seabra Code".

== Biography ==
António Luís de Seabra was born on 2 December 1798, on board the vessel Santa Cruz off the coast of the Portuguese colony of Cape Verde; his parents, António de Seabra da Mota e Silva (1763–1834) and Doroteia Bernardina de Sousa Lobo Barreto (1764–1809), were travelling to Rio de Janeiro as his father had been named ouvidor of Vila do Príncipe in Minas Gerais, State of Brazil. He was baptised on 5 February 1799, in Rio de Janeiro: his godparents were his sister, Josefa Emília de Seabra, and Luís Beltron de Gouveia de Almeida, the chancellor of the city's appellate court.

He returned to Portugal for his preparatory studies, after which, in 1815, he enrolled at the University of Coimbra, obtaining his degree in Law in 1820. From his student years, around the time of the Liberal Revolution of 1820, he was politically on the side of the progressive Constitutionalists: when he heard of the Revolution in Oporto, he enthusiastically penned a sonnet (Accordai, cidadãos, que a Pátria geme) that became rather popular in the day. It was also around this time that he founded the monthly political and literary periodical O Cidadão Literato.

In August 1821, he was made a juiz de fora in the town of Alfândega da Fé; within that year (on 3 December), he was issued public praise from José da Silva Carvalho, the Minister of Justice, for his services.

When the liberal government fell in June 1823, following the royalist Vilafrancada coup, Seabra tendered his resignation. He retreated to his paternal family's house in Vila Flor, where he busied himself translating Horace's Satires and Epistles (which he would only publish in 1846) and studying rhetoric and natural philosophy. In 1825, he was appointed juiz de fora in Montemor-o-Velho. In 1826, he published in Coimbra an Ode to Infanta Isabel Maria, who was at the time Regent. That same year, he had Cândido Lusitano's poem O Mentor de Filandro published.

As he actively opposed King Miguel's assumption of the throne in 1828, he was forced to move abroad, where he published political pamphlets about the current political situation in his home country. He only returned to Portugal in 1833, following the victory of the Constitutionalists in the Portuguese Civil War. He was soon appointed prosecutor in the Castelo Branco appellate court, as well as interim corregedor of Alcobaça. In 1834, he was elected to Parliament for Trás-os-Montes.

In 1836, he founded the political periodical O Independente and, that same year, was again elected to Parliament, although the September Revolution interrupted the works of the legislature before they began. On 9 December 1838, he was sworn in as member of Parliament for Penafiel and, later, for Oporto. During the Patuleia, he was part of the Oporto Junta.

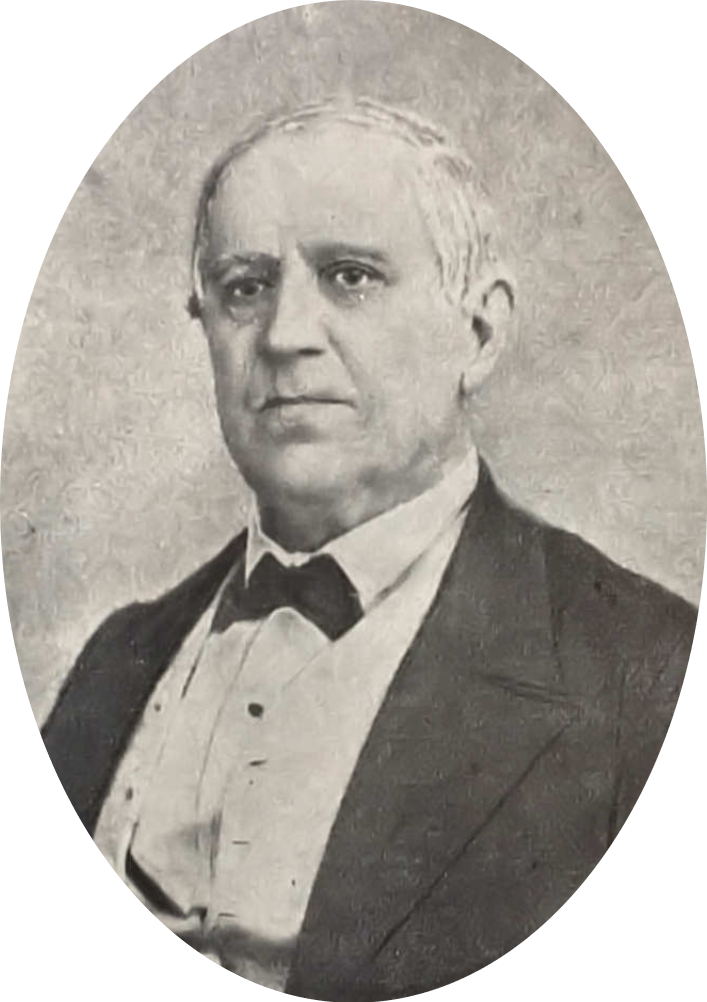
The Viscount of Seabra in his elder years

In 1849, he published in Lisbon Observações sobre o artigo 630.º da Novíssima Reforma Judiciária ("Remarks on Article 630 of the New Judiciary Reform) and, in 1850, in Coimbra, the first volume of A Propriedade, Filosofia do Direito; para servir de introdução ao Comentário sobre a lei dos forais.

By decree of 8 August 1850, he was trusted with the important mission of drawing up a civil code collecting and restating all private law of the kingdom, as mandated by the Constitutional Charter of 1826. The project was concluded in 1859, and the civil code was discussed at length in Parliament before finally being approved on 1 July 1867. This civil code, sometimes called Seabra's Civil Code remained in force for exactly a century, until it was replaced in 1967.

In the 1851 legislative election, he was again elected member of Parliament, this time for Aveiro, and, on 4 March 1852, was made Minister of Ecclesiastical Affairs and Justice in the third Saldanha government. In 1862, he became Speaker of the Chamber of Deputies and, in 1868, after he was made a Peer, became Speaker of the Chamber of Most Worthy Peers.

On 26 July 1866, he was made Rector of the University of Coimbra, and was inaugurated the following 14 August; his tenure ended in 1868, when he was again made Minister of Ecclesiastical Affairs and Justice in the first Ávila cabinet.

In the last years of his life, his eyesight declined almost to the point of blindness; still, he endeavoured to translate Ovid's Tristia. His last published work, in 1893, was a translation of Anne-Marie du Boccage's La Colombiade, dedicated to Queen Amélie of Orléans. He left a novel, titled António Homem, ou o Mestre Infeliz, unfinished.

== Private life ==
The Viscount of Seabra married twice: the first marriage was to his cousin Doroteia Honorata, the sister of the Baron of Mogofores, and the second to Ana de Jesus Teixeira, widow of Manuel José Teixeira, with children from her first marriage. The Viscount of Seabra had three sons from his first marriage: António Luís de Seabra, Álvaro Ernesto, and Francisco Luís (who became a priest). From his second marriage, he had a single son, Aristides de Seabra.
