= 1838 Portuguese legislative election =

← November 1836	12 August 1838 (first round); 12 September 1838 (second round)	1840 →

All 142 seats in the Chamber of Deputies 72 seats needed for a majority
Prime Minister before election
1st Marquis of Sá da Bandeira
Septembrist
Elected Prime Minister
1st Marquis of Sá da Bandeira
Septembrist

Parliamentary elections were held in Portugal on 12 August and 12 September 1838.

== Electoral system ==
A new constitution was promulgated in 1838 following the September Revolution in 1836 and the elections were held based on a decree on 9 April 1838. The constitution provided for a bicameral parliament with a directly-elected Senate (replacing the appointed Chamber of Most Worthy Peers) and Chamber of Deputies. Voting was restricted to men over the age of 25 and income of at least 80,000 reals, although members of religious orders, servants, vagabonds and those still dependent on their parents were barred from voting. The voting age was reduced to 20 for men who were married, serving in the military, had graduated from university or were part of the secular clergy. Candidates for the Chamber were required to have a net income of over 400,000 reals, and at least half of those elected in each constituency were required to have been born in the area or have lived in it for at least a year. Candidates for the Senate needed to be at least 35 years old and had a higher income threshold, but were not required to have a geographic link to their constituency.

The 142 members of the Chamber of Deputies were elected from 28 multi-member constituencies with between 2 and 15 seats, with 116 representing the mainland, 12 from the islands and 14 representing overseas colonies. The elections were held using a two-round system, with candidates required to receive a majority of the vote to be elected in the first round, before a second round (which was limited to a number of candidates equalling three times the number of seats remaining to be filled) was carried out on a plurality basis.

== Results ==
The result was a victory for the ruling Setembristas, who contested the elections in an alliance with their former Cartista opponents as the 'Electoral Association of the Centre'. The Setembristas affiliated with Manuel da Silva Passos were grouped as the 'Public Electoral Association', whilst the Radicals formed the 'Civic Association'.
