= 1847 Portuguese legislative election =

← 1845	28 November and 12 December 1847	1851 →

All 142 seats in the Chamber of Deputies 72 seats needed for a majority
Prime Minister before election
1st Duke of Saldanha
Cartista
Elected Prime Minister
1st Duke of Saldanha
Cartista

Parliamentary elections were held in Portugal on 28 November and 12 December 1847.

== Electoral system ==
The elections were held under the Constitutional Charter of 1826, and in accordance with a decree issued on 12 August 1847. Members of the Chamber of Deputies were elected in an indirect system in which voters elected provincial assemblies, who in turn elected members of the Chamber.

The 142 members of the Chamber of Deputies included 119 representing the mainland and 10 representing islands (all elected in multi-member constituencies), with another 13 representing overseas colonies (three elected in single-member constituencies and ten in multi-member constituencies).

== Campaign ==
Supporters of the Patuleia boycotted the elections.
