= Viscount of Passos =

The Viscount of Passos (Portuguese: Visconde de Passos) is a title created by King Pedro V of Portugal by decree dated 24 April 1860 in favour of D. Beatriz de Passos Manoel, daughter of the Portuguese statesman Manuel da Silva Passos and D. Guiomar de Souza Girão, from the Girão family of Santarém, Portugal. She also became Viscountess Ferreri by marriage.

The title is now represented by the Barons of Arcossó, as the first Viscountess's heir (her sister) married the Baron of Arcossó.
