= São Bento Palace =

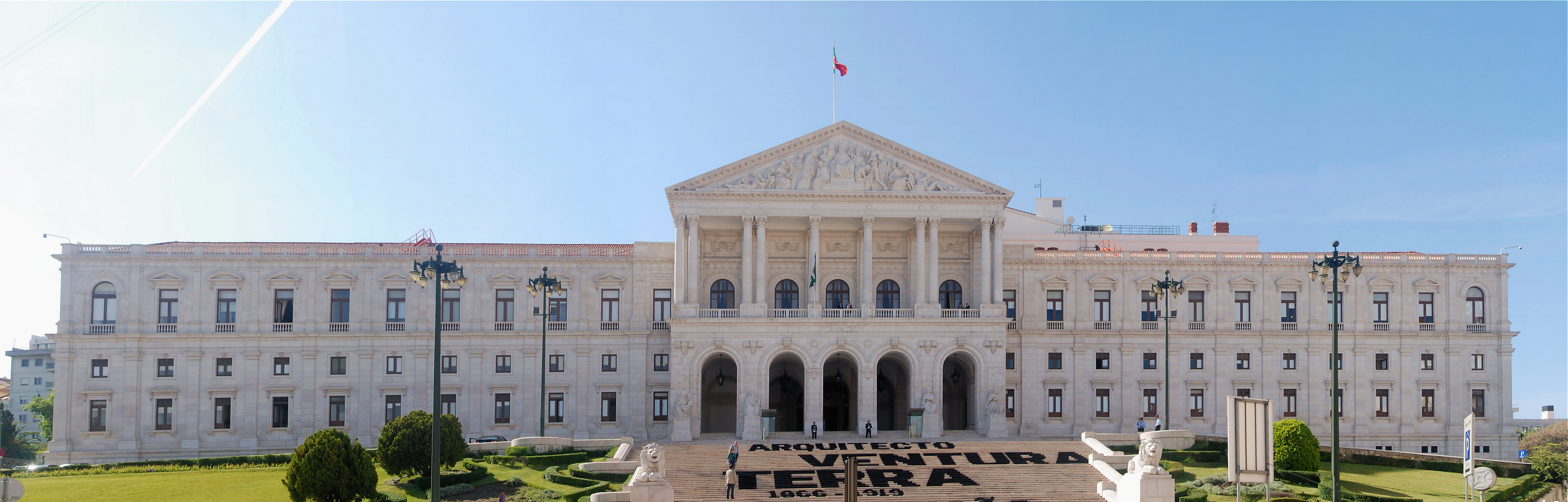
- The main façade of the building
- Interactive map of the São Bento Palace area

General information
- Architectural style: Neoclassical
- Location: Lapa; Lisbon, Portugal
- Coordinates: 38°42′45″N 9°9′13″W
- Construction started: 1598
- Completed: 1938; 88 years ago

Design and construction
- Architects: Adolfo Marques da Silva, Cristino da Silva

The São Bento Palace (Portuguese: Palácio de São Bento, lit. 'Palace of Saint Benedict') is the seat of the Assembly of the Republic, the parliament of Portugal. It is located in the Estrela district of Lisbon. The building has been home to the succession of Portuguese national parliaments since 1834. São Bento Mansion, the official residence of the Prime Minister of Portugal, is within the grounds of São Bento Palace.

The building was originally a monastery of the Benedictine Order. Construction began in 1598 and was close to completion when the building was damaged by the 1755 Lisbon earthquake. Monasteries in Portugal were dissolved in 1834 and São Bento became national property. The building was repurposed as the meeting place of the Cortes Gerais, the parliament of the new constitutional monarchy of Portugal.

The building was modified to suit its new purpose. The former chapter house of the monks was remodelled into a meeting chamber in 1867, which remains in use today. A major fire in 1895 led to more extensive changes, which produced the current façade.

The Portuguese revolution of 1910 and the formation of the Estado Novo in 1933 replaced the Cortes with different bicameral legislative assemblies, which continued to meet in São Bento Palace. Following the Carnation Revolution in 1974, the building was used for the Constituent Assembly that drafted the current constitution of Portugal, enacted in 1976. The new constitution established the unicameral Assembly of the Republic, which meets in the building.

== History ==
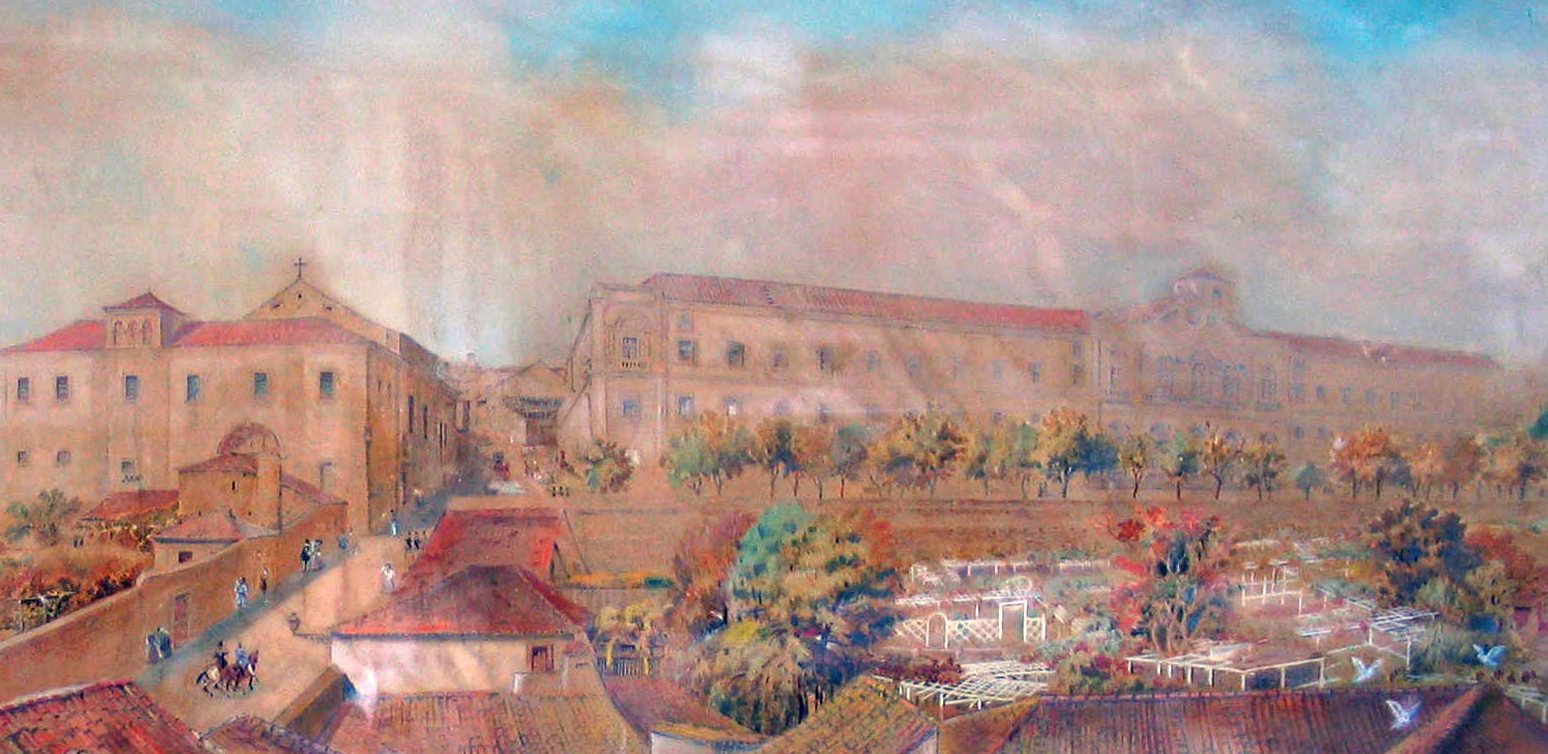
São Bento Palace, then known as the Palace of the Cortes, c. 1851.

The Palace has its origin in the first Benedictine monastery of Lisbon, established in 1598. In 1615, the monks settled in the area of the Casa da Saúde (Health House), that housed people sick with the plague. The new monastery was built during the 17th century in a Mannerist style, designed by Jesuit architect Baltazar Álvares, later followed by João Turriano. The large building, of rectangular shape, had a church flanked by two towers, four cloisters, dormitories, a kitchen, etc. Construction of the new building was almost complete when the 1755 Lisbon earthquake caused extensive damage to it.

=== Parliament ===
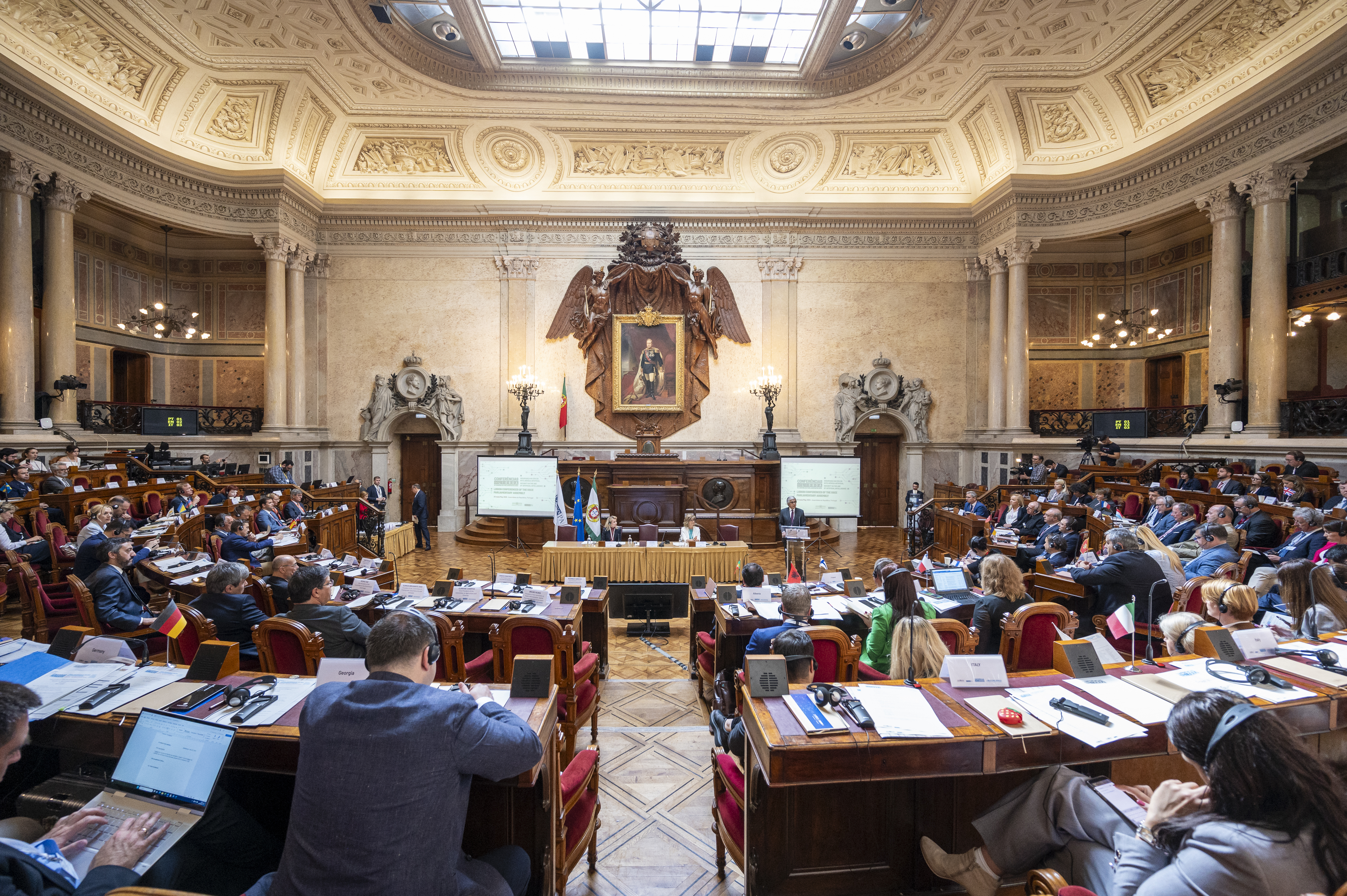
Senate chamber as it appears today.

After the Liberal Revolution (1820) and the suppression of religious orders in Portugal (1834), the monks were expelled from the monastery and the Cortes Geraes (Portuguese parliament) was installed in the building, then called Palácio das Cortes or Parlamento. From then on, the old monastery was systematically adapted to its new functions. The first architect in charge was Possidónio da Silva, who designed the first session rooms.

The Chapter house (meeting place of the monks) of the monastery was totally remodeled by French architect Jean François Colson into a session room in 1867. The Portuguese Chamber of Peers met here until 1910, followed by the Senate and later the Corporative Chamber in this room, until the 1976 Constitution established unicameralism.

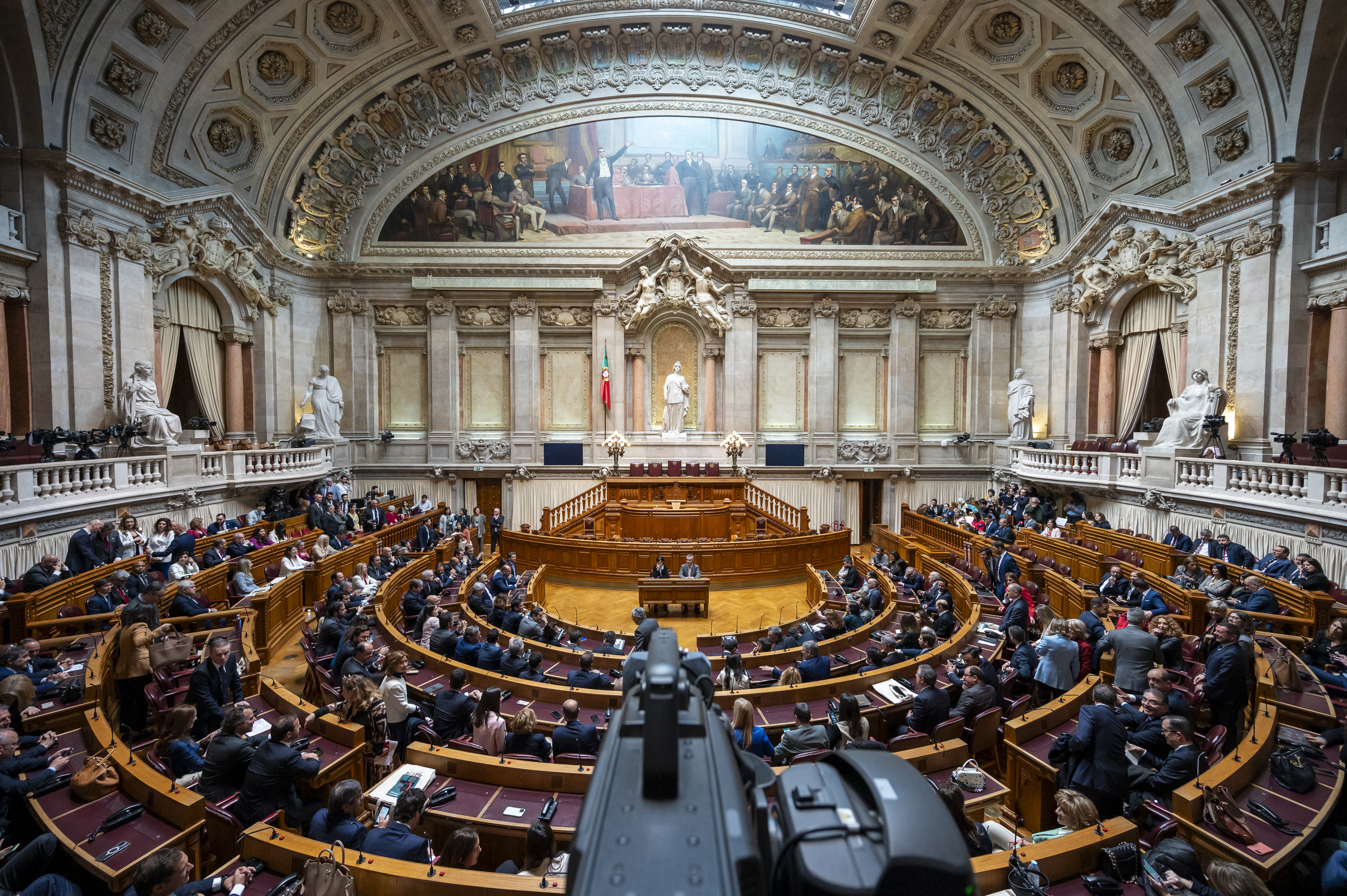
The Assembly of the Republic's sessions chamber as it appears today.

In 1895, a fire destroyed the session room of the lower house and it was necessary to repair and expand the Parliament building. Portuguese architect Miguel Ventura Terra was put in charge of the remodeling project, which lasted until the 1940s. Ventura Terra built a new session room for the lower house (inaugurated in 1903) and altered the facade of the building, adding a neoclassical portico with columns and a triangular pediment. He also remodeled the atrium, the monumental inner stairway and many other rooms. Architect Adolfo Marques da Silva continued the works in the 1920s.

In the 1940s, during Salazar's Estado Novo regime, the monumental stairway in front of the portico of the Parliament was completed. The stairway was designed by Cristino da Silva, who was also responsible for the project of the gardens in the rear of the Palace.

Since Portugal became a democracy after the 1974 Carnation Revolution the area in front of the palace has been the most popular location for demonstrations held in Lisbon.

In 1994–1997 an annex building designed by Fernando Távora, was constructed near the old Palace. The modern structure allowed for an expansion of the space of the Portuguese Assembly without altering its historic appearance.

The Palace of Saint Benedict has been classified as a National Monument since 2002.

== Prime Minister's Residence ==
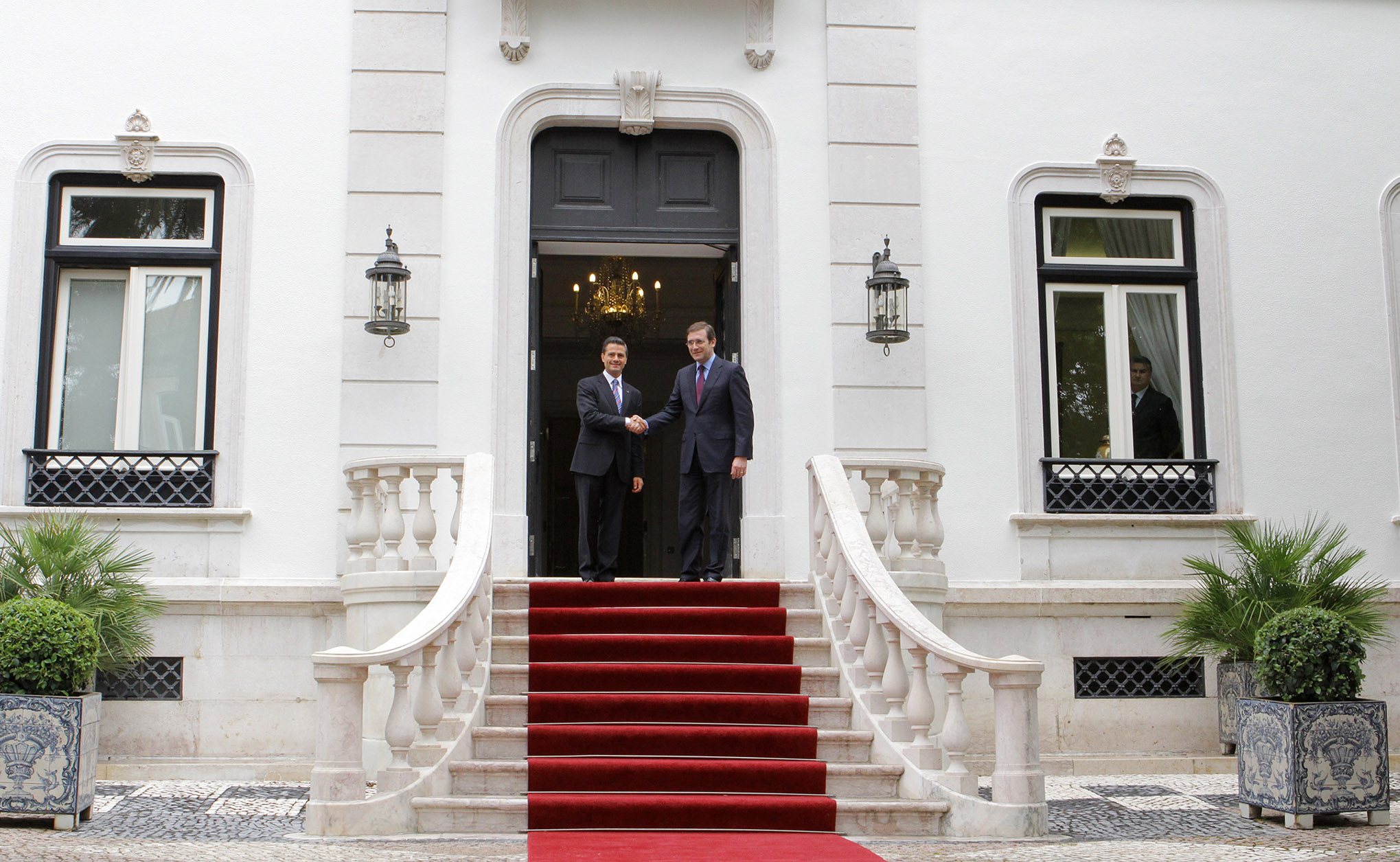
The adjoining São Bento Mansion, residence of the prime minister

Just behind the main building there is a mansion that serves as residence for the Prime Minister of Portugal. The mansion, dated from 1877, was built within the garden of the old monastery. It has been the Prime Minister's official residence since 1938, when Salazar moved in.
