= 1845 Portuguese legislative election =

← 1842	3 and 17 August 1845	1847 →

All 142 seats in the Chamber of Deputies 72 seats needed for a majority
Prime Minister before election
1st Duke of Terceira
Cartista
Elected Prime Minister
1st Duke of Terceira
Cartista

Parliamentary elections were held in Portugal on 3 and 17 August 1845.

== Electoral system ==
The elections were held under the Constitutional Charter of 1826, and in accordance with a decree issued on 28 April 1845. Members of the Chamber of Deputies were elected in an indirect system in which voters elected provincial assemblies, who in turn elected members of the Chamber.

The 142 members of the Chamber of Deputies included 119 representing the mainland and 10 representing islands (all elected in multi-member constituencies), with another 13 representing overseas colonies (three elected in single-member constituencies and ten in multi-member constituencies).

== Results ==
The result was a victory for the Cabralistas, with Miguelistas advising voters to boycott the elections. The opposition won only six seats in Alentejo.
