= Portuguese Civil Code =

The current Portuguese Civil Code (Portuguese: Código Civil) was approved on 26 November 1966 and entered into force on 1 June 1967. It replaced the previous Portuguese Civil Code of 1868.

Its text was prepared by a Commission of Professors of Law which in its final phase was presided and substantially changed by Professor Antunes Varela, which is why it is often referred to as "Varela's Civil Code" as opposed to "Seabra's Civil Code", the previous Civil Code of Portugal which preparation commission was presided over by the Viscount of Seabra and entered into force precisely one century before the new code was enacted in 1967.

However, due to Professor Vaz Serra's important contributions, the Portuguese Civil Code is often also referred to as "Vaz Serra's Civil Code", specially by authors from the Faculty of Law of the University of Lisbon.

== Structure ==
The Code adopted the German classification of areas of Civil Law, following the BGB, and is divided into 5 main parts (or "books"):

1. the General Part (Parte Geral), Sections 1 through 396, comprising regulations that have effect on all the other four parts and on Private Law in general, such as sources of law, legal interpretation, personhood, legal capacity, emancipation of minors, declarations of will, rescission, formation of contracts, limitation periods, and agency.
2. Law of Obligations (Direito das Obrigações), Sections 397 through 1250, describing contractual obligations and all other sources of civil obligations, including torts, unjust enrichment and negotiorum gestio.
3. Property Law (Direito das Coisas), Sections 1251 through 1575, describing possession, ownership, other property rights (e.g. servitudes), and how those rights can be transferred.
4. Family Law (Direito da Família), Sections 1576 through 2023, describing marriage, marital property schemes, legal guardianship, and other legal relationships among family members.
5. Inheritance Law (Direito das Sucessões), Sections 2024 through 2334, which regulates what happens to a deceased's estate, as well as the law of wills and contracts concerning succession (pacta successoria).

The Civil Code was subjected to many revisions and changes both in Portugal as well as in some of its former overseas possessions where it still is in force, but the main structure and concepts of it remain untouched since 1867.

== The Macau Civil Code of 1999 ==
In the former Portuguese possession of Macau, handover to China in 1999, a new Civil Code was approved in 1999. The Macau Civil Code is direct descendant of the Portuguese Code, as it follows the same structure, but with several developments, changes, simplifications and additions.

== Bibliography ==
- CARLOS FERREIRA DE ALMEIDA, ASSUNÇÃO CRISTAS and NUNO PIÇARRA (eds.), Portuguese law. An overview, Almedina, Coimbra, 2007.
- JORGE GODINHO, Macau business law and legal system, LexisNexis, Hong Kong, 2007.
- JORGE GODINHO, The Macau Civil Code. A partial English translation .

== See also ==
- Portuguese Goan Civil Code
- Brazilian Civil Code
