= Mouzinho da Silveira =

Portuguese statesman, jurist and politician

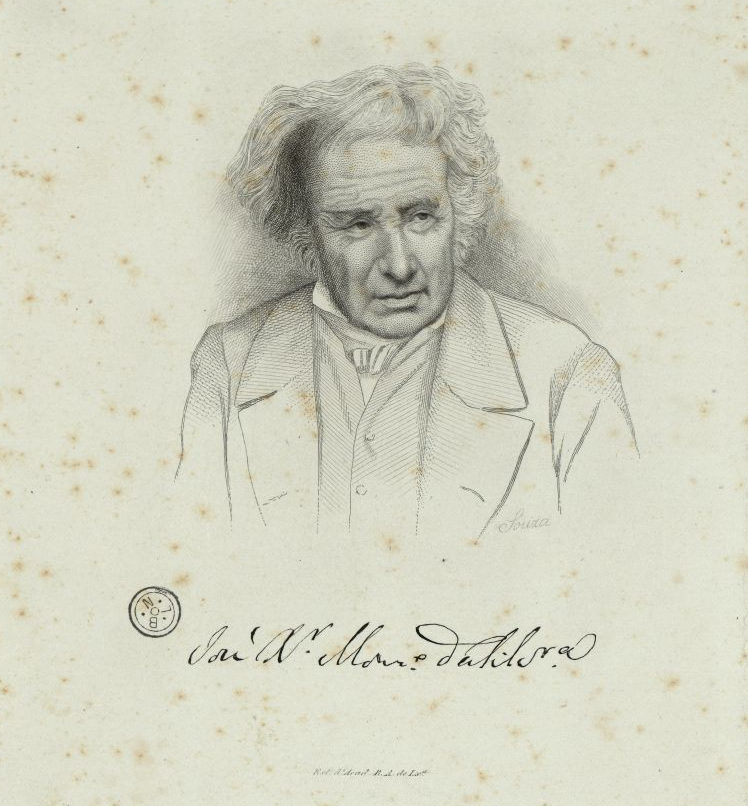

Minister and Secretary of State of the Exchequer
- In office 3 March 1832 – 12 January 1833
- Monarchs: Pedro, Duke of Braganza (regent for Maria II of Portugal)
- In office 28 May 1823 – 19 June 1823
- Monarch: John VI of Portugal

Personal details
- Born: José Xavier Mouzinho da Silveira; July 12, 1780 Castelo de Vide, Portugal
- Died: April 4, 1849 (aged 68) Lisbon, Portugal
- Citizenship: Kingdom of Portugal
- Party: Chartist

José Xavier Mouzinho da Silveira (12 July 1780 in Castelo de Vide – 4 April 1849 in Lisbon) was a Portuguese statesman, jurist and politician, as well as one of the most important personalities of the Liberal Revolution of 1820, responsible for legislation and administrative reforms that shaped Portuguese institutions, taxation and justice in the period after the Constitutional Charter. Imprisoned after the Abrilada, he became one of the most uncompromising defenders of the Charter, remaining in exile for several years after 1828, and only returning in 1834 to defend his legislative agenda, exiling himself once again in 1836. In the final ten years of his life, Mouzinho da Silveira retired from public life, before his untimely death.

== Early life ==
Mouzinho da Silveira was born on 12 July 1780, in Castelo de Vide, son of a wealthy rural property-owner. After learning arithmetic, Latin and Greek, he departed for Porto in October 1796, where he remained until June of the following year, taking preparatory classes for Law classes (which he registered for in October 1797). He completed his studies on 19 July 1802.

Following the death of his father, in May 1799, he assumed the head of the household, obtaining financial independence. Always frugal, Mouzinho kept copious registers of his receipts and personal expenses, including them later in his autobiography. He returned to Castelo de Vide where, between 1803 and 1804, he occupied his time with tasks associated with the family estate, especially after the death of his maternal grandmother. At the end of 1804, he left for Lisbon where, until 1897, he attended the royal court, an obligation of his family’s position. He was present in Lisbon at the arrival of French troops, under the command of Junot (in November 1807), during the first French Invasion of Portugal.

== Career ==
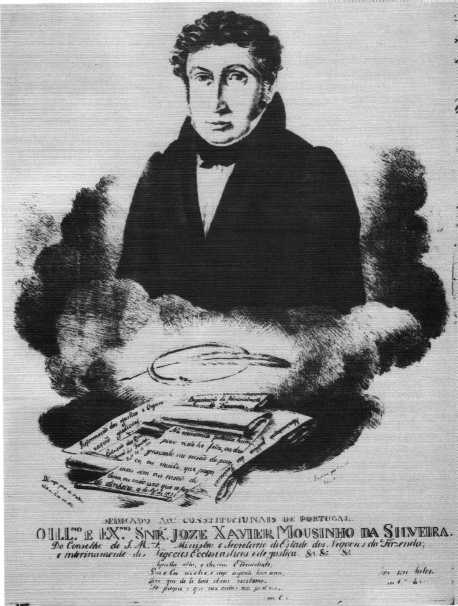
An early caricature of Mouzinho da Silveira

Having completed the obligations that had called him to Lisbon, Mouzinho da Silveira opted not to return to Castelo de Vide, where he might have joined the magisterium (the legal body of Portuguese magistrates). Instead, he took office on 1 March 1809, as a juiz de fora (itinerant judge) for Marvão, where he had lived over the previous three years (preparing the defenses during the Napoleonic invasion). At the end of his mandate, he returned to Lisbon (on 15 October 1812), before once again heading out, this time for Castelo Branco, where he worked from 29 May 1813 to 22 November 1816. Returning to Lisbon, Mouzinho was named Provedor of the comarca for Portalegre. Having arrived on 21 January 1817, he took up his post on 5 March and continued in this role until 2 January 1821.

=== Liberal Revolution ===
Following the Liberal Revolution of 1820, Mouzinho da Silveira ran in the elections, although he was unsuccessful in obtaining a posting in the Chamber of Deputies.

In February 1821, he was entrusted with the collections for the Ministry of Finance in Estremoz, in addition to visiting the comarcas of Évora and Ourique, which he was unable to complete, being dispatched on 11 April to the Alfândega Grande do Açúcar (Great Sugar Customshouse) in Lisbon, where he began exercising his role on 15 May. From this position he was named Minister for Finances on 28 May 1823. Surviving the expulsions of the Vilafrancada, Mouzinho was confirmed as Minister by decree on 31 May, but immediately fired by decree on 19 June 1823. Referring to this nomination, Mouzinho wrote: "Being administrator of the customs house, I was obligated, against my will, to be Minister of Finance on 29 May 1823, and surviving the reestablishment of the absolute monarchy, I was fired on the 15th and returned to my job in the customshouse, retaining my honors as Minister" In this short passage through the corridors of government, Mouzinho was able to promulgate the decree of 12 June 1823, revoking the taxes and 10% special fees, which were established by law in March 1823.

During the Abrilada, Mouzinho was arrested (30 April 1824), and imprisoned in the Monastery of Batalha, where he remained until 14 May, when he was liberated, along with other political prisoners.

By decree, on 8 August 1825, Mouzinho was elevated to the honors of Noble Knight of the Royal Household (Portuguese: Casa Real). He continued to occupy positions of fiscal oversight; he was named on 12 November 1825 to the Board responsible for elaborating a general customs authority for Lisbon, and began working on the boards responsible for the revision of the 1810 treaty with the United Kingdom, and in 1825, with Brazil.

In the elections of October 1826, he was elected deputy for the Alentejo, becoming part of the commission for finances, in the Chamber of Deputies, centering his parliamentary activities on material associated with taxation and management of the national heritage.

=== Liberal Wars ===
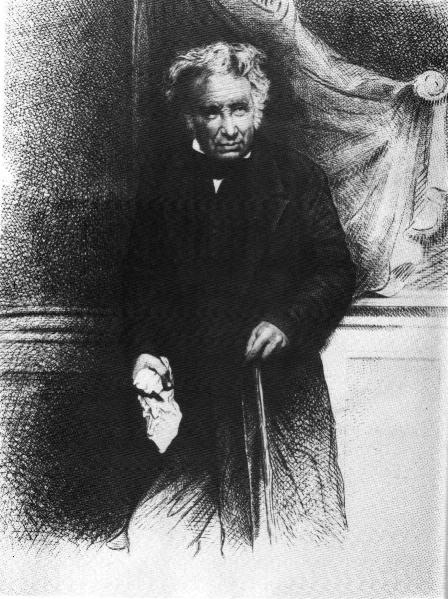
A later, statesman-like, portrait of Mouzinho da Silveira

Feeling the need to go into exile with the ascendancy of King Miguel, in March 1828, he requested a years sabbatical to travel, and left Lisbon on 3 April 1828, arriving in Paris on 15 April. He remained in Paris until 1832, developing studies on taxation, while maintaining an intense letter-writing exchange with friends and family in Portugal. During this period, his patrimonial situation deteriorated significantly, reflecting his absence from Portugal and economic crisis of the country at the time. With his wife and child in Paris, Mouzinho attempted to reinforce his son’s education, that included languages (including German), chemistry and other sciences, which were not available in Portugal. Mouzinho also attempted to force his son into copperage, which Mouzinho had already established, but had never attained the level of income that he once had.

On 7 February 1831, he joined the consultative commission that substituted the Council of State, during the Regency, in the name of Queen Maria II of Portugal. On 6 June, he was also asked to join the Chamber of Deputies' Finance Commission, the council responsible for collecting funds and loans necessary to subsidize the Liberal cause.

==== Azores ====
While in Paris, he was invited to accompany Peter IV during his campaign to return Portugal to a liberal monarchy, and departed on 25 January 1832 for Terceira, from Belle-Isle. He was appointed Ministro e Secretário de Estado dos Negócios da Fazenda (Minister and Secretary of State for Finance Affairs) and interim Ministro dos Negócios Eclesiásticos (Ministry of Ecclesiastical Affairs) and Ministro da Justiça (Minister of Justice) in Angra on 2 March 1832. On 23 April 1832, accompanied by Peter IV, he traveled to Ponta Delgada, before departing the Azores with an expeditionary force to Mindelo. While in the Azores, Mouzinho promulgated 24 decrees and ordinances to reform the administration of the islands’ government.

He disembarked in Mindelo on 8 July, where he traveled to Porto, encircled by Miguelist forces. After their defeat, he remained in Porto, promulgating several reforms, publishing 20 decrees and ordinance.

=== Devorism ===
On 9 August, in complete disagreement with the progress of public finances, particularly with loans obtained by Palmela, and harassed by his opponents, who accused him of radicalism and folly, he sought a resignation from the positions he held, which was granted on 3 December 1832 by Pedro IV. He abandoned the Ministry exactly nine months after being nominated, leaving behind 44 decrees and ordinances, that were the base of the modern Portuguese tax system, and introduced a reform in the judicial system. In this short span, and during the civil war, Mouzinho affirmed his position as one of the more important personalities of Liberalism in Portugal. While the tax system has evolved significantly, Mouzinho was responsible for the foundations of the Supreme Court of Justice and re-structuring of the Public Ministry.

During the month of December 1832, and month of January 1833, he was placed in the task of obtaining funds for Liberal forces participating in the Barra de Lisboa (the city was still in the control of Miguelist forces), and developed activities in Vigo. Continuing to disagree with the condition of the public finances, he was fired from these tasks, and renominated Director of Customs. However, he left for a new period of exile in Paris on 19 March 1833.

He returned to Portugal on 11 September 1834, and joined the Chamber of Deputies, where he remained until 1836, always uncompromising in his defense of his legislation and maintaining a constant intervention in matters of the public finances. In the 1835 elections he was re-elected deputy for the Alentejo.

On 16 August 1836, he refused to pledge allegiance to the 1822 Constitution, and resigned from his post as Director of Customs. He was imprisoned, and when released, he returned to exile in France.

== Later life ==
He returned to Portugal in 1839, returning to the Chamber of Deputies on 15 February, and remained in this post until 1840, and continued to intervene on matters of public finances. In 1842 he became a candidate for deputy to the Alentejo, but lost by two votes. On 1 December 1844, Mouzinho was charged with elaborating a general regulation for the customs-houses.

His personal finances improved in 1846, but his hopes for his son were dashed, and his personal health began to deteriorate, at the time that his wife began residing in Paris.

José Xavier Mouzinho da Silveira died in Lisbon, on 4 April 1849, after a fall on his staircase, caused when he was moving a piano, resulting in his being crushed.

== Memorials ==
Starting in 1875, with erection of a monument in the parish of Margem, municipality of Gavião, sculpted by Célestin Anatole Calmels, many Portuguese community have honored this notable citizen. In the Sala dos Passos Perdidos, in the Palace of São Bento, Mouzinho da Silveira was homaged with an oil painting by Columbano Bordalo Pinheiro, while a comparable painting in Municipal hall of Lisbon, painted by José Rodrigues (executed in 1866) honours the politician, and in the Grão Vasco Museum (Viseu) a similar painting of Mouzinho by Columbano was framed.

While, in the secondary centenary of his birth (1980) a commemorative monument was inaugurated in Castelo de Vide, many of the cities of the country have homages to the Mouzinho da Silveira, including schools and roadways.
