= September Revolution =

1836 coup d'etat in Portugal

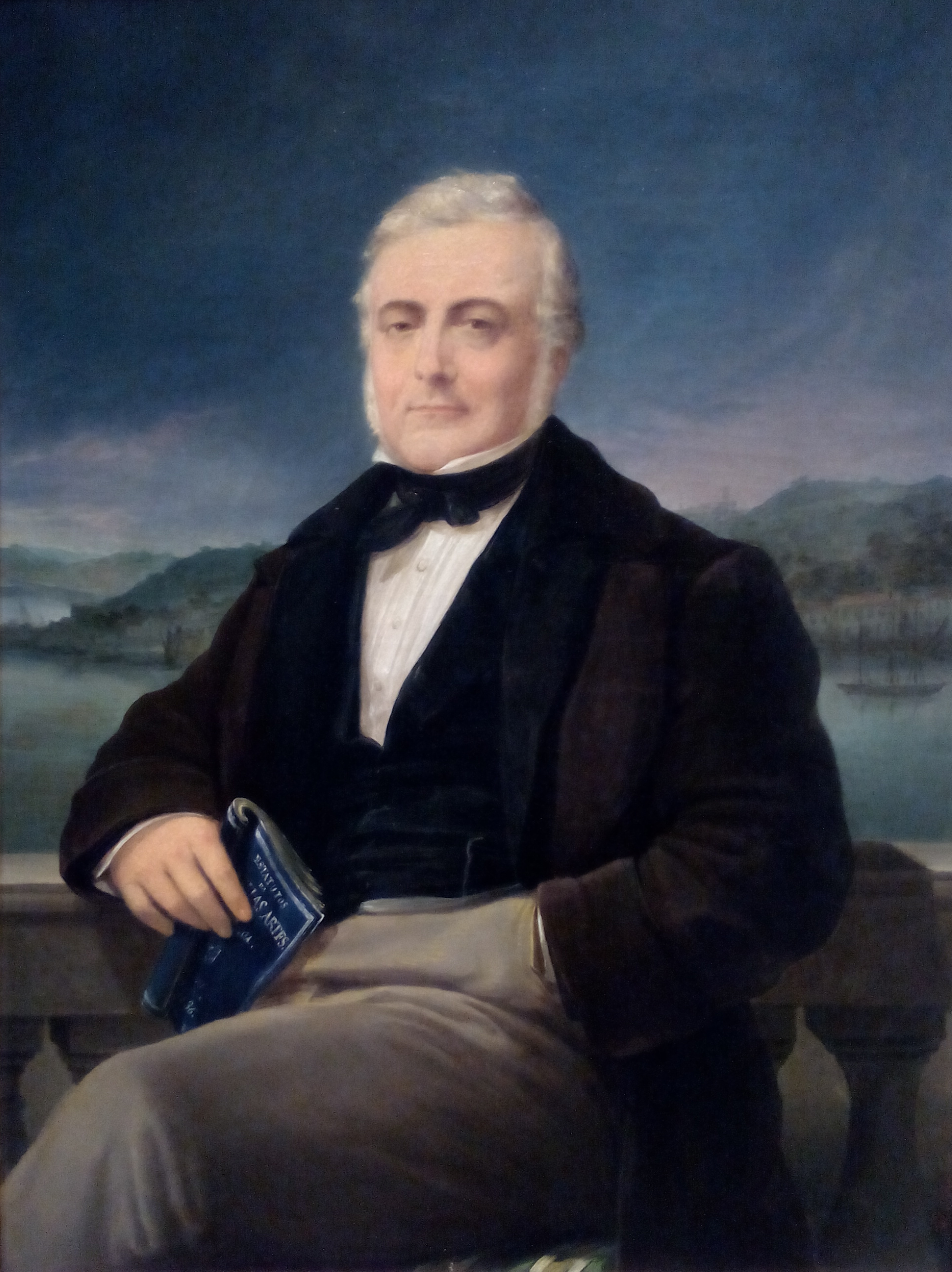
Passos Manuel, main leader of the September Revolution

The September Revolution (Portuguese: Revolução de Setembro) was a coup d'état that took place on 9 September 1836 in Portugal and ended Devorismo, leading to the promulgation of the Constitution of 1838.

== Causes ==
A number of liberal laws, advocated by Mouzinho da Silveira had come into effect in Portugal. These included the abolition of chapels with an income of less than 200,000 reais per year, the abolition of tax on the transfer of ownership in real estate, except for sale or exchange of lands in connection with church tithes and special jurisdictions; the suppression of the distilling and wine exporting privileges of the Companhia de Vinhos and the Alto Duero, and the establishment of a new judiciary structure, with new court circuits called "distritos de relacionamento". These reforms were significant changes aimed at putting into practice the principles of free trade and economic liberalism embraced by the government established under the Constitutional Charter of 1826.

These reforms did not meet with the expected success. The sale of national property only benefited a limited group of the landed wealthy, which was enriched and added to its already extensive properties. Most people continued to live in poverty. The country's economy continued to be highly dependent on the United Kingdom, particularly since the 1810 treaty that allowed preferential access to the Portuguese market for British goods. Portugal continued to lack manufacturing and remained backward in comparison with many other European countries.

Another cause of discontent was that the Constitutional Charter of 1826, granted by King Pedro IV, lacked legitimacy as it had not been passed by a constituent assembly. The Mutiny of La Granja de San Ildefonso in Spain against Queen Maria Christina in August 1836 gave Portuguese liberals further encouragement.

== The revolution ==
The revolutionary movement started in Porto, where radicals calling for the restoration of the Constitution of 1822 were returned in the general election of 17 July. The outgoing government of the Duke of Terceira won a clear majority (79 seats to 41 for the opposition), but when the opposition representatives from Porto arrived in Lisbon on 9 September, various pamphlets and other publications had already circulated in the capital, spreading revolutionary ideas and attacking the government. For the most part, the people of the city welcomed the movement with open arms. As the representatives disembarked they were met by a giant crowd, shouting slogans in favour of the revolution and for the Constitution of 1822.

Queen Maria II and the government had no means to fight the revolution, all the less since the National Guard has declared its loyalty to the movement, and relinquished power to its leaders, the Count of Linhares, Sá da Bandeira and Passos Manuel. None of these had taken a direct part in the revolution itself, but stood out as the most capable men among those who defended it.

The revolution of 9 September was one of the few in Portuguese history that began with a popular civil society movement, which only later received support from the military.

== See also ==
- Septembrism
