= Cortes Gerais =

Legislature of the Kingdom of Portugal, 1822–1910

General Courts Cortes Gerais

Type
- Type: Unicameral (1822–1826); Bicameral (1826–1910)
- Houses: Chamber of Peers (1826–1838; 1842–1910); Chamber of Senators (1838–1842); Chamber of Deputies

History
- Founded: 1822
- Disbanded: 1910

Leadership
- First President of the Chamber of Peers: Nuno Caetano Álvares Pereira de Melo, 6th Duke of Cadaval
- Last President of the Chamber of Peers: Gonçalo Pereira da Silva de Sousa e Menezes, 3rd Count of Bertiandos
- First President of the Chamber of Deputies: Father Francisco de São Luís Saraiva
- Last President of the Chamber of Deputies: José Capelo Franco Frazão, 1st Count of Penha Garcia
- Seats: 90 Peers of the Realm; 148 Deputies of the Nation

Meeting place
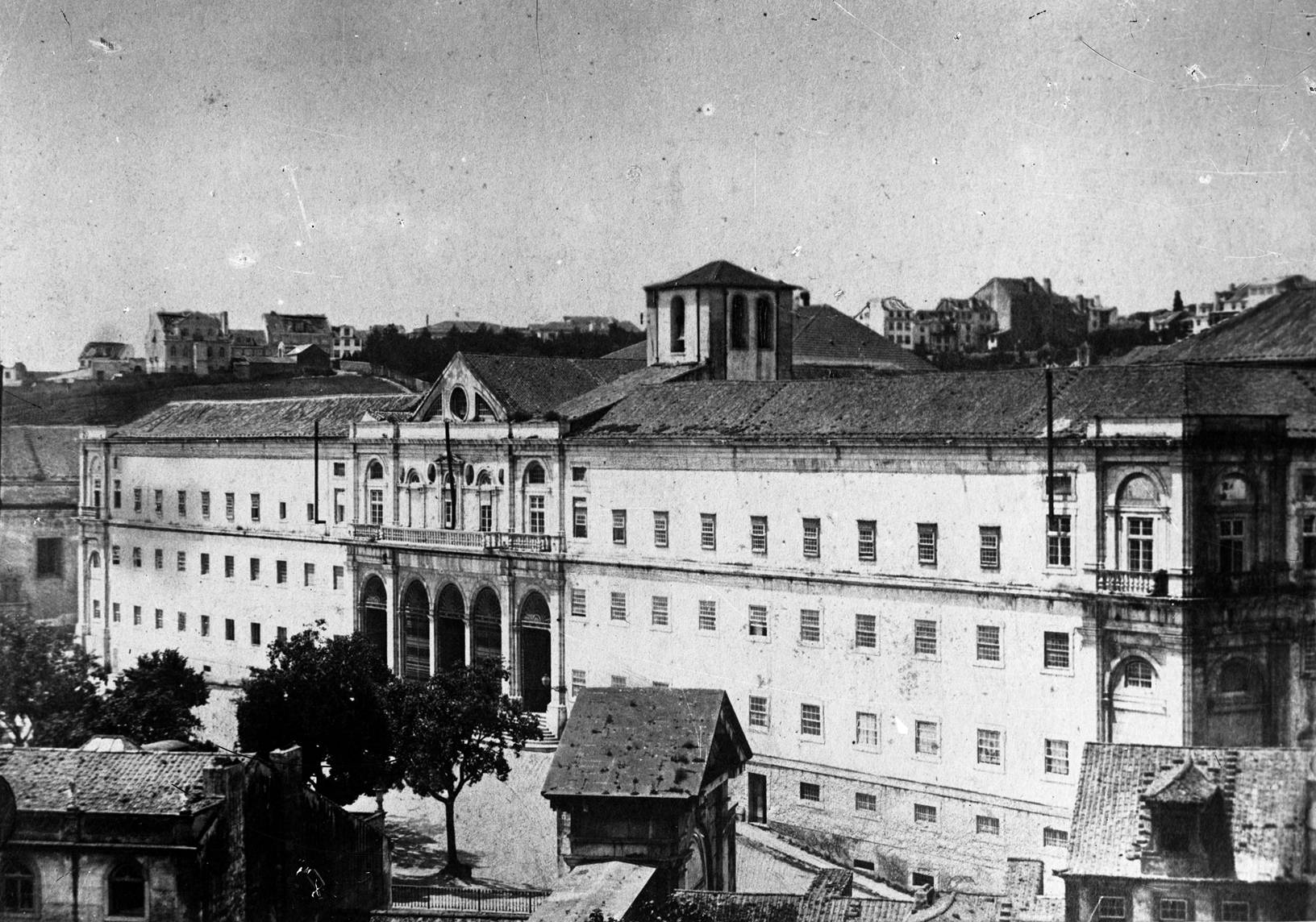
- Palace of the Cortes before 1895, seat of the Cortes Gerais, Lisbon

The Cortes Gerais (pre-1911 spelling: Cortes Geraes, meaning General Courts in Portuguese) were the parliament of the Kingdom of Portugal during the Constitutional Monarchy period.

The Cortes were established by provision of the Portuguese Constitution of 1822 as a unicameral parliament. However, the Constitutional Charter of 1826 reformed the Cortes as a bicameral legislature, with the Chamber of Most Worthy Peers of the Kingdom as its upper house and the Chamber of Gentlemen Deputies of the Portuguese Nation as its lower house. During the brief period in which the Constitution of 1838 was in force (1838-1842), the Chamber of Peers was abolished and replaced by the Chamber of the Senators or Senate. With the restoration of the Constitutional Charter in 1842, the Chamber of Peers was also restored as the upper chamber of the Cortes.

The name of the legislature originates from the traditional Portuguese Cortes, the assemblies of representatives of the three estates, during the period of absolute monarchy.

Since 1834, the Cortes had their seat in the Palace of the Cortes in Lisbon. This building was originally a Benedictine monastery and continues to be until today the seat of the Portuguese parliament, being presently referred as the São Bento Palace.

== Gallery ==
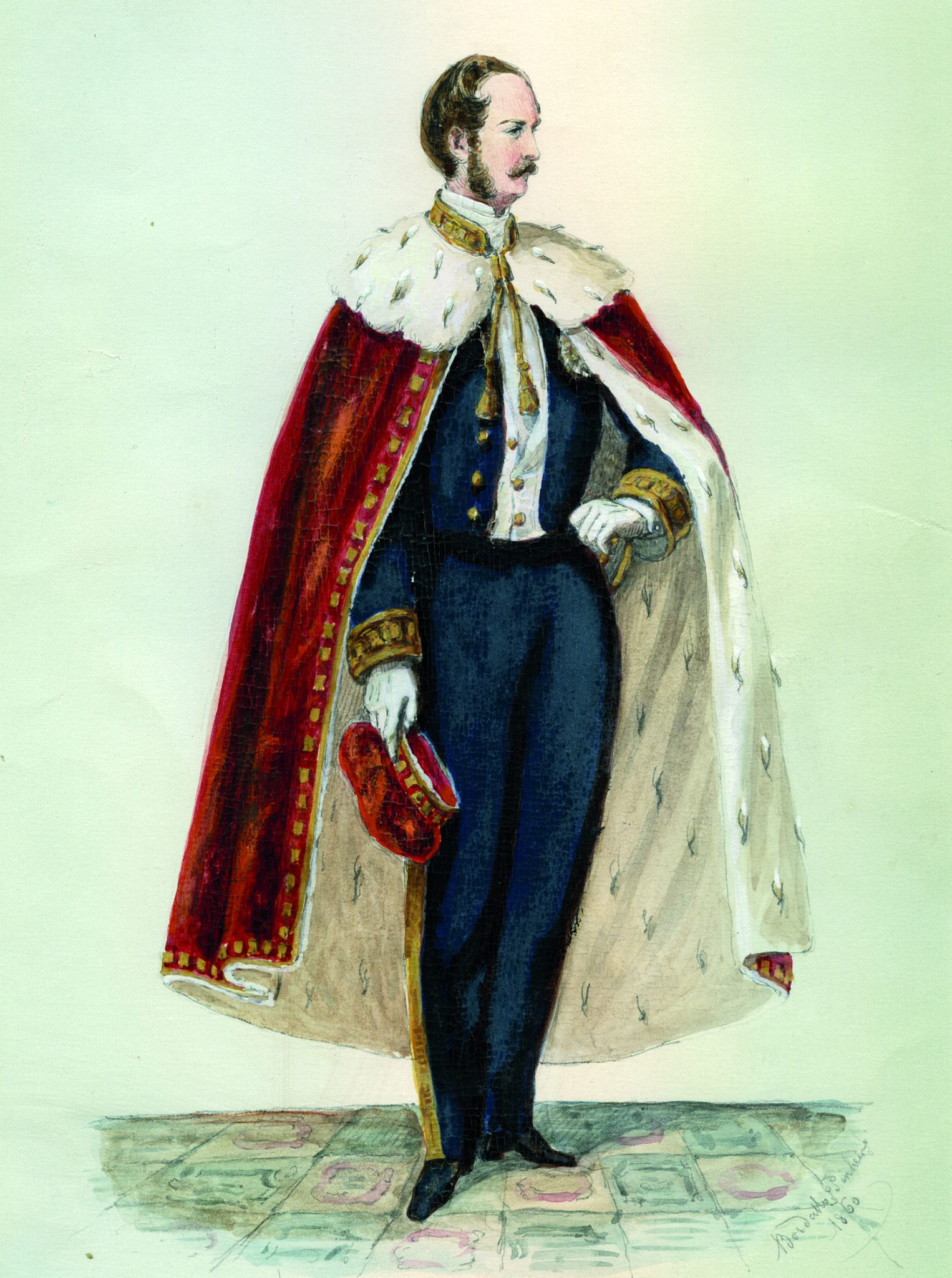
Uniform of a member of the Chamber of Peers (1860)

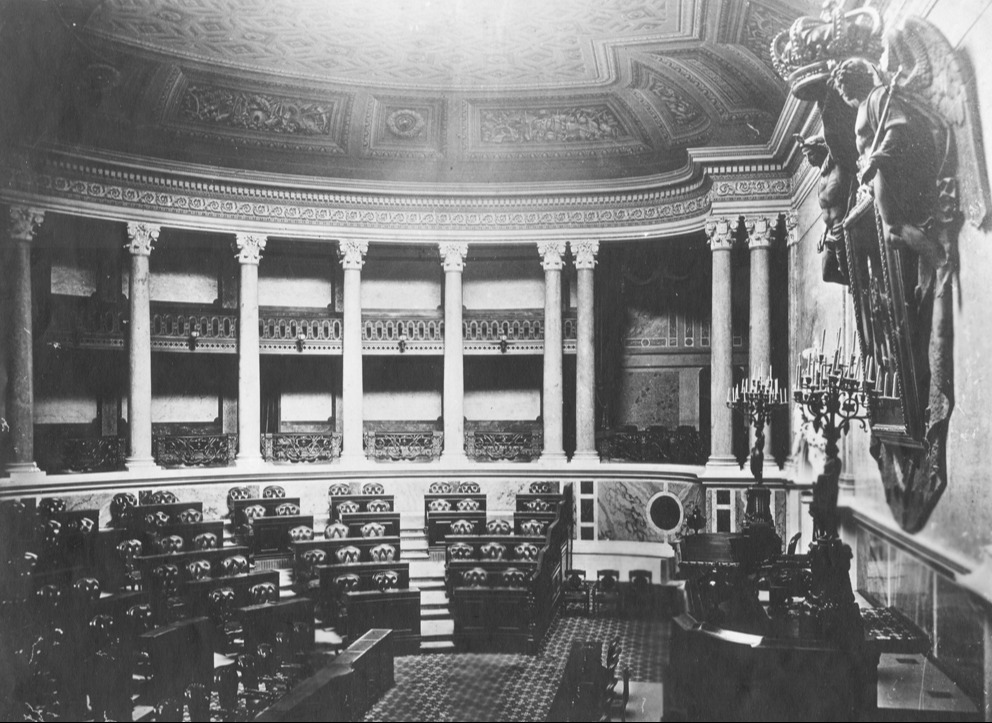
The Chamber of the Peers

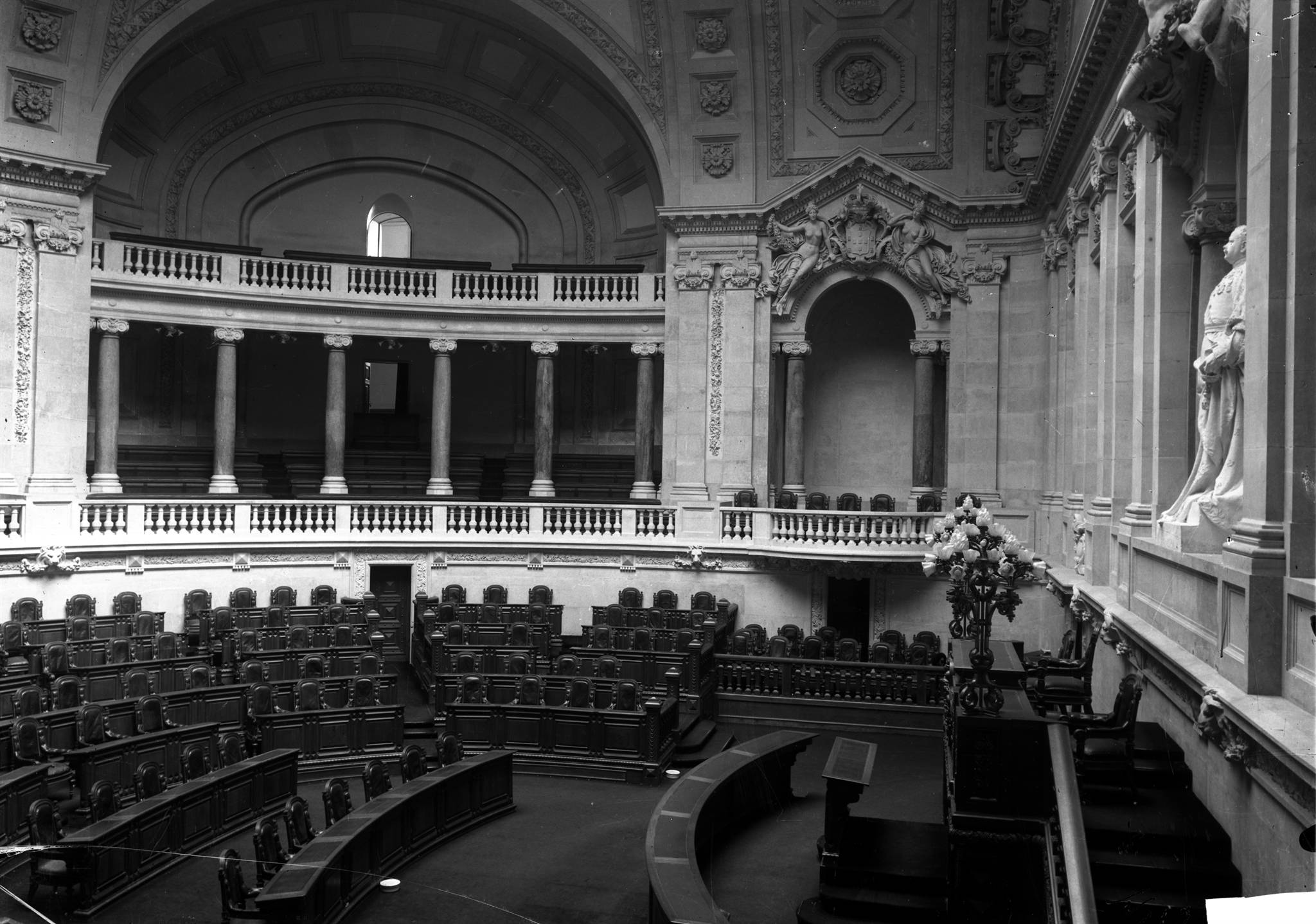
Chamber of Deputies in the early 20th century

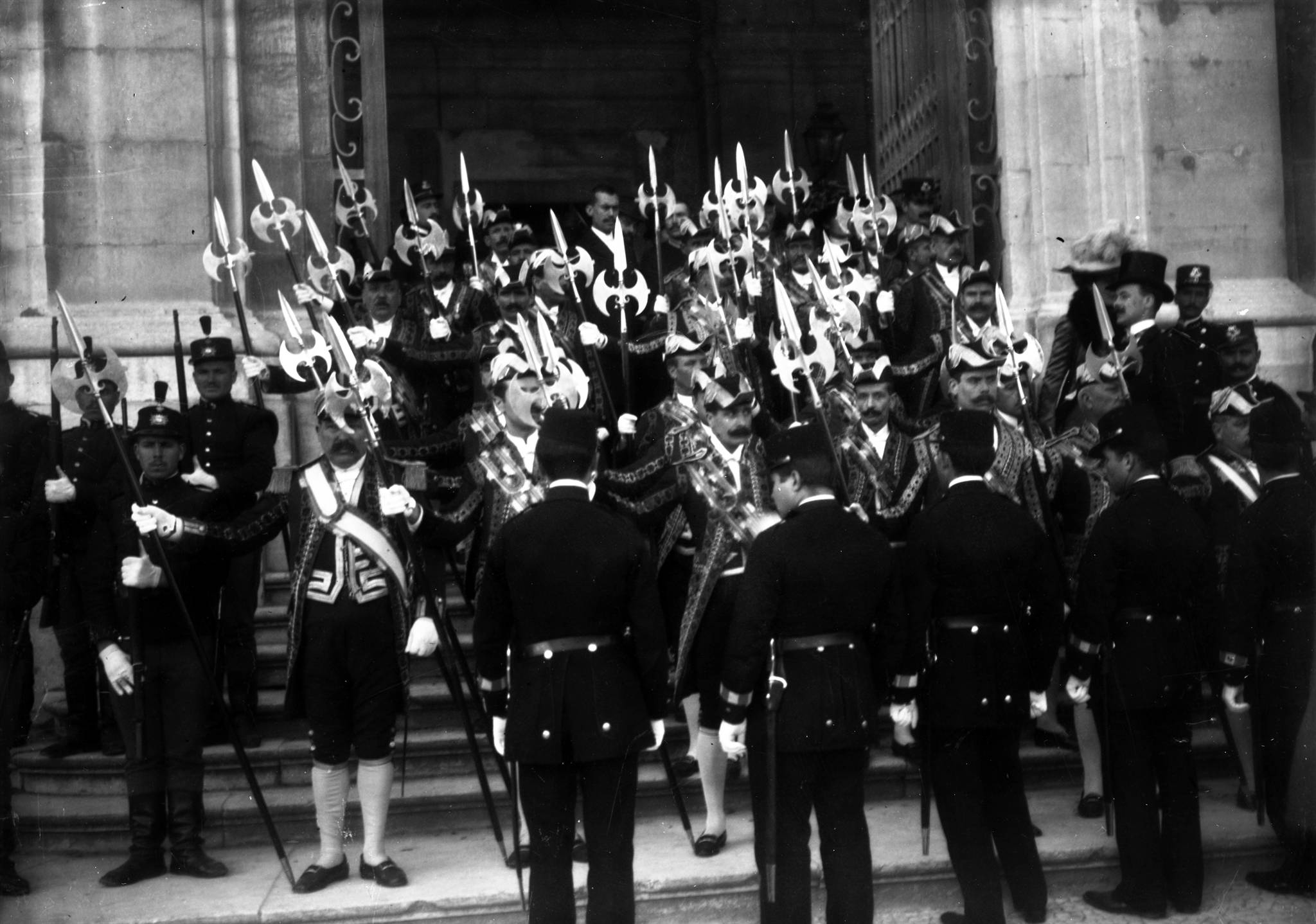
The Royal Guard of the Archers waiting King Manuel II for the opening of the 1908 session of the Cortes

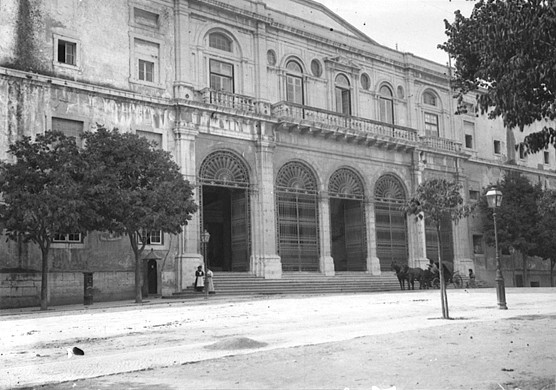
Main entrance of the Palace of Cortes in the early 20th century
