= History of Portugal (1834–1910) =

Kingdom of Portugal and the Algarves Reino de Portugal e dos Algarves (Portuguese)
- 1834–1910
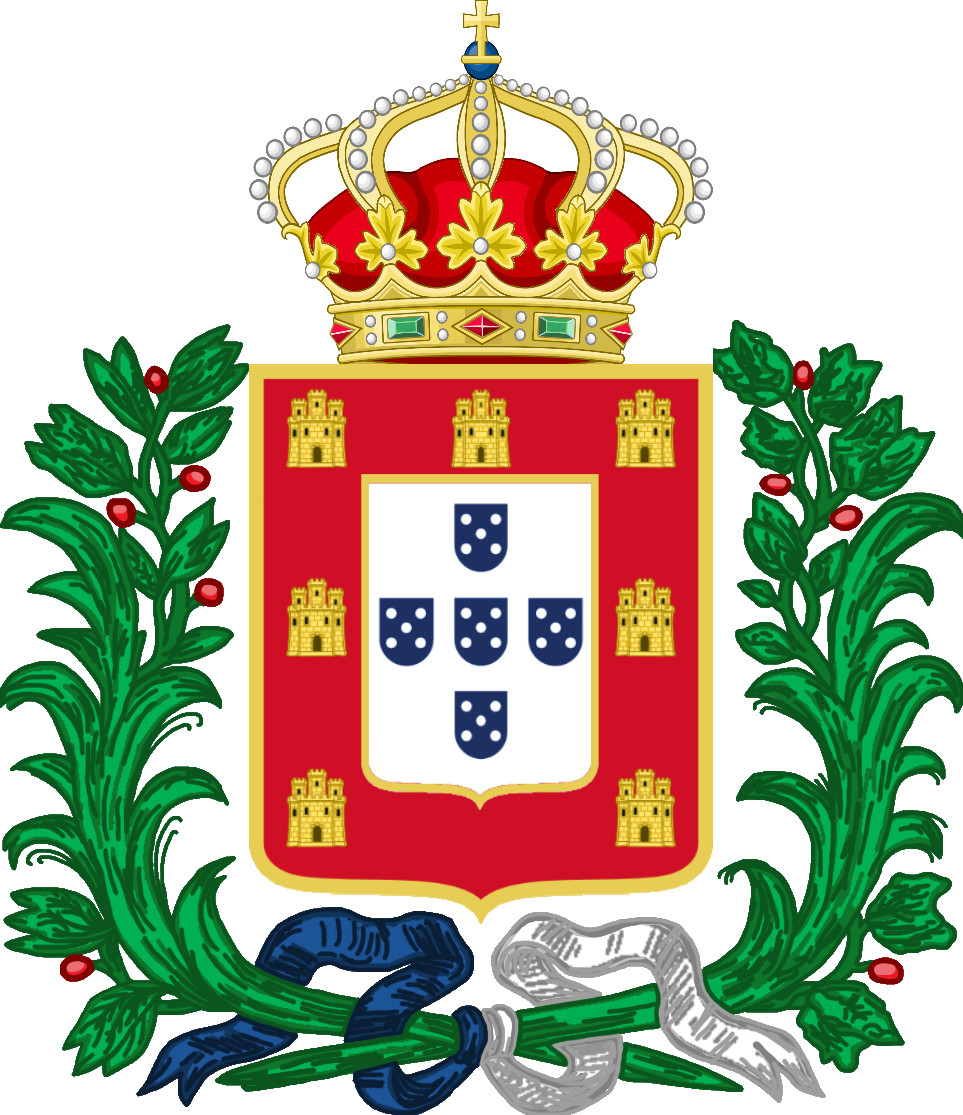
- Flag Coat of arms
- Anthem: Hino da Carta "Anthem of the Charter"
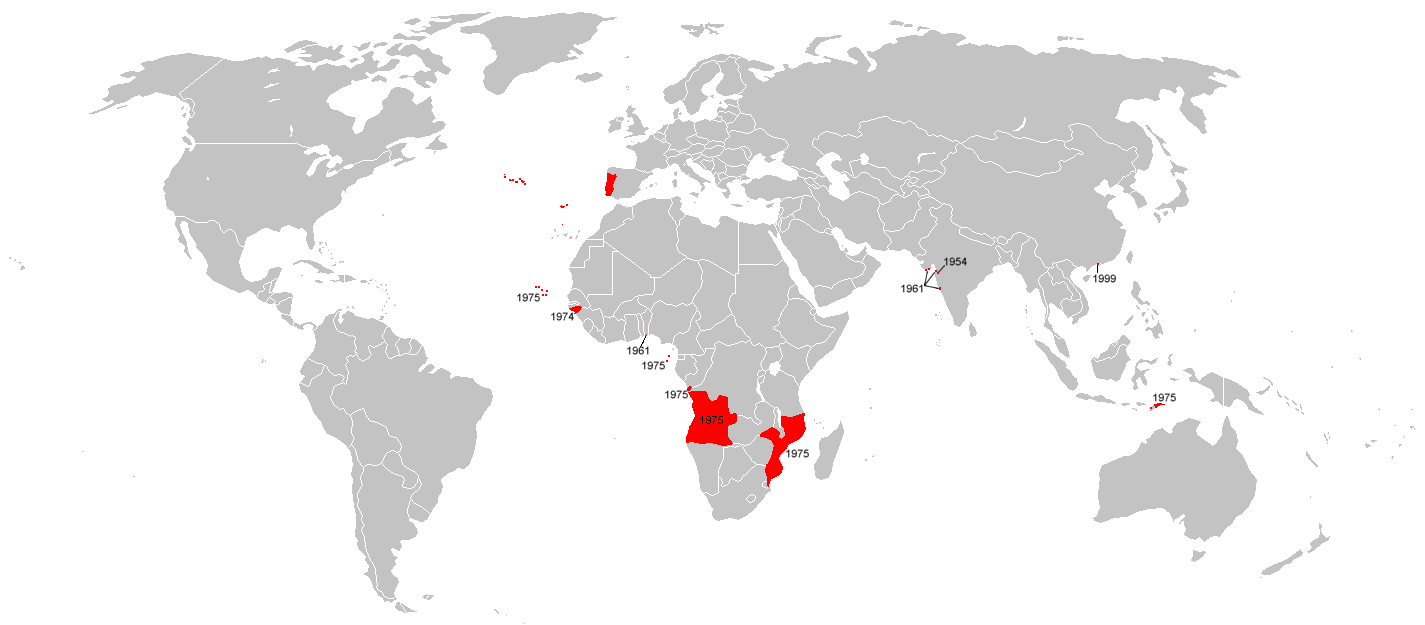
- Capital: Lisbon
- Common languages: Portuguese
- Religion: Roman Catholic
- Government: Unitary parliamentary constitutional monarchy
- Monarch
  - 1834–1853: Queen Maria II (first)
  - 1908–1910: King Manuel II (last)
- Prime Minister
  - 1834–1835: Pedro de Holstein (first)
  - 1910: António Teixeira (last)
- Legislature: Cortes Gerais
  - Upper house: Chamber of Peers
  - Lower house: Chamber of Deputies
- History
  - Liberal Wars: 26 July 1834
  - Lisbon Regicide: 1 February 1908
  - Revolution of 1910: 5 October 1910
- Currency: Portuguese real
- ISO 3166 code: PT
Preceded by	Succeeded by
Kingdom of Portugal	First Portuguese Republic

The Kingdom of Portugal under the House of Braganza was a constitutional monarchy from the end of the Liberal Civil War in 1834 to the Republican Revolution of 1910. The initial turmoil of coups d'état perpetrated by the victorious generals of the Civil War was followed by an unstable parliamentary system of governmental "rotation" marked by the growth of the Portuguese Republican Party. This was caused mainly by the inefficiency of the Portuguese monarchy as well as their lack of interest in governing the country and acceptance of the 1890 British Ultimatum, which forced the abandonment of the colonialist Pink Map attempt to unite the colonies of Angola and Mozambique.

The situation culminated in a dictatorship-like government imposed by King Carlos I, in the person of João Franco, followed by the king's assassination in the Lisbon regicide of 1908 and the revolution of 1910.

== Devourism ==
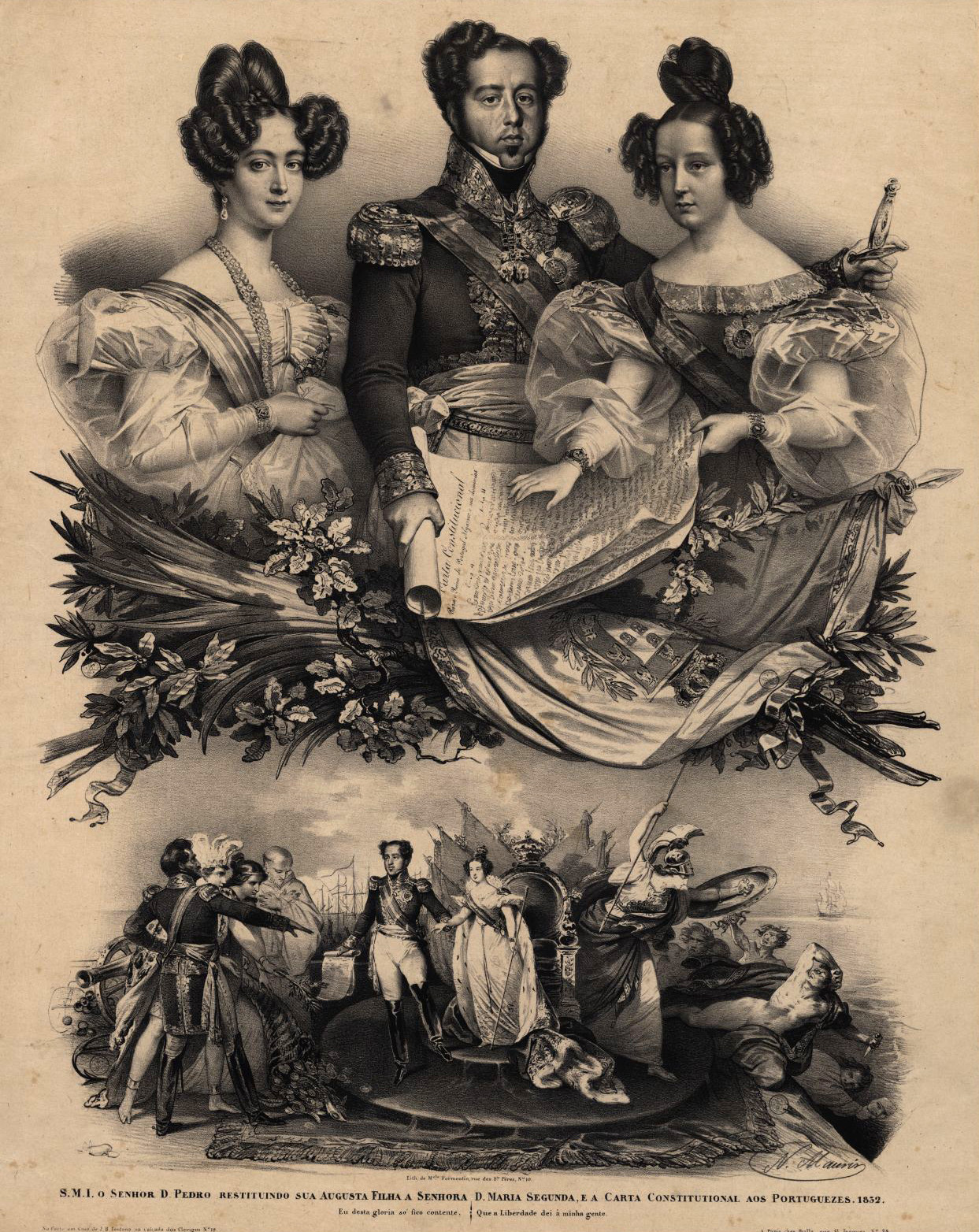
The imperfect Constitution of 1826, that begin a conflict within liberal revolutionaries; former-King and Regent (with Consort: left) introducing the 1826 Charter to Princess Maria da Gloria

The post-Civil War period of the constitutional monarchy saw the rise of competing manifestations of liberal ideology and their adherents. Gastão Pereira de Sande, Count of Taipa, then one of the oppositionists (commonly referred to as "radicals"), described the government as a "gang made up to devour the country under the shadow of a child" (a figure of speech wherein the "child" represented the young Queen, Maria II of Portugal). This was one of the earliest references to Devorismo (Devourism), i.e., the corrupt practice of using the public treasury to enrich oneself or to benefit another.

The post-Civil War period was characterized by a precarious executive office, a lack of ideological definition, the marginalization of popular movements, indiscipline and the intervention of military chiefs in politics. The death of the Regent, formerly King Pedro, after successfully installing his daughter as Queen, thrust the inexperienced Maria da Glória into a role that, at the age of 15 years, she was unprepared to handle.

Her counselors, aristocrats and nobles, still used the royal authority as a counterweight to the liberal revolution. There were two political currents: the moderates who defended the Constitutional Charter of 1828, and those who promoted reinstatement of the democratic Constitution of 1822. Both parties were disorganized, neither felt solidarity with the monarch, and their ideologies were not clearly defined; politicians regularly swung between Vintista and Constitucionalista politics. Meanwhile, the majority of the population were disenfranchised: illiterate and culturally unrefined, they merely supported whichever wind blew in their favor. Education was available only in the cities, whose local merchants and bureaucratic functionaries had some sense of social mobility.

=== Economy ===
Economically, Portugal was no better off in the post-war era. It continued to derive its (diminishing) wealth from cultivation of the land, taxes and land rents, while neglecting development of a financial structure to make available the capital necessary for entrepreneurs to acquire machinery and sustain industry; consequently, the economy stagnated. As late as 1910, only 1/5 of the workers in industries classified as "manufacturing" were employed in factories with more than 10 workers. The environment of small shops and handicraft operations was not conducive to labour unions.

Politicians sponsored many small newspapers, which provided an outlet for numerous writers to debate economic questions and promote their particular reforms. Known as the "Generation of the 70s" the writers focused on political economy, and how the traditional economy could be stimulated to progress and growth. Important writers included Antero de Quental, who wrote abstract philosophical essays; Joaquim P. Oliveira Martins (1845–94), who focused on financial topics; José Maria Eça de Queiroz (1845–1900), who employed realism and irony in his fiction to make points in political economy; and Rafael Bordalo Pinheiro with his biting caricatures of pompous politicians. Writers often considered the dilemmas caused by economic growth and material progress in France and Britain. Socialism appealed only to Quental, who was a founder of the Partido Socialista Português (Portuguese Socialist Party). They did concern themselves with the political consequences of rich powerbrokers, the threat of depopulation in rural areas, the worsening of urban poverty. They dealt with issues of social injustice, worker unrest, and the proper role of the state in promoting the public welfare.

Today, the decline of the Portuguese economy towards the end of the 19th century is still traceable via anthropometric indicators, i.e. height. To this day, the Portuguese are the shortest Europeans. This divergence first became apparent during the 1840s and increased significantly during the 1870s. Two significant causes for this development can be identified. Firstly, Portugal's real wage evolution was slow as a result of comparatively late industrialization and slow economic growth performance. Secondly, scant investments into education led to delayed human capital formation (in comparison with other European countries). The thus arising Portuguese welfare deficit can be associated with the stagnating heights of the Portuguese.

=== Innovation ===
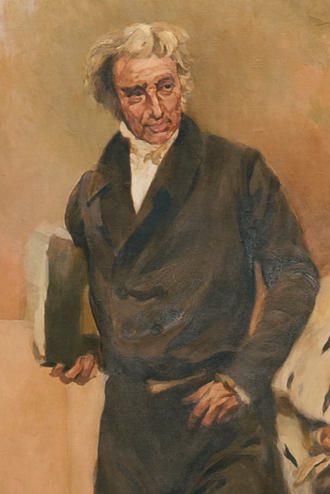
Mouzinho da Silveira, whose influence during the post-War era would result in changes to the economy, the separation of church and state and the reorganization of municipalities

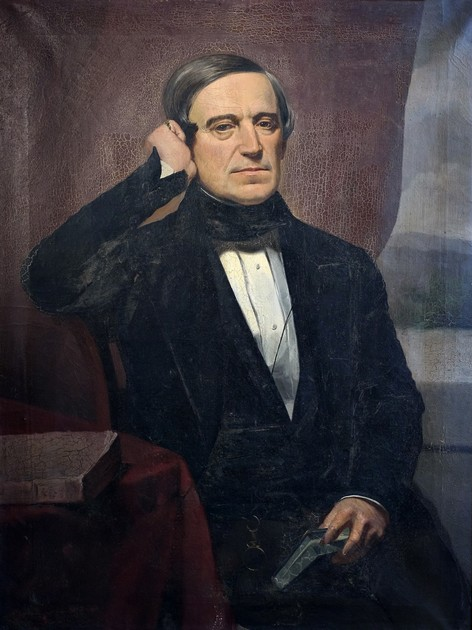
The Viscount of Seabra, who would be responsible for the establishment of a new civil code in Portugal

The constitutional monarchy was marked by a series of legislative proposals by the government of the day, which had its base in the idealism of Mouzinho da Silveira. During his terms in office Silveira promoted revolutionary legislation for both the absolutist and liberal governments of the time (1823–1833). Payment of rents to the State, relations between the people and the Church, and municipal governance remained as they were in the medieval era. Silveira realized, to the chagrin of other Portuguese politicians, that politics was an instrument dependent on socioeconomic conditions. Marginalized at first by both absolutists and liberals, his ideas and solutions were later adopted by the new generation of liberal politicians in the post-War era. Among his many proposals, successive governments adopted his policies of disengaging the economy from social conditions, limiting taxes to 5%, ending tithes, abolishing seigniorial fees, reducing export taxes to 1%, terminating the regulation of inter-community commerce and government intervention in municipal affairs, as well as separating the judiciary and administrative offices, liberating general commerce and prohibiting some monopolies (such as the sale of soap and of Porto wines). In general, his initiatives were legislated by the post-War regimes to eliminate the privileges of the elite classes, establish social equality, encourage liberalization of the economy and improve government performance.

=== Secularization ===
In 1834, Joaquim António de Aguiar terminated the state sanction of religious orders and nationalized their lands and possessions. Later referred to as Mata-Frades (Killer of Brothers), Aguiar's government took control of the convents, churches, manor homes and holdings of various institutes that had been sustained by donations of the religious faithful and placed them for sale. Although they hoped to place land and goods in the hands of the more disadvantaged, most of the poor did not have the capital to purchase them. In fact, total sales were one tenth of what was expected, and most holdings were purchased by speculators or existing landowners.

=== Municipalization ===
Another facet of the post-War era was the reorganization of existing administrative units, in order to centralize or decentralize them and then to reconcentrate power in the national government. The debate began in 1832, when Mouzinho de Sousa's administration oversaw implementation of a system of appointing regional administrators to govern the municipalities, thus imposing central government programs and ideology on them: it was accused of being Napoleonic in its organization. The issue of centralization or de-centralization was an ongoing debate in the post-War era, resulting in successive legislation veering one way or the other. The government of Passos Manuel finally extinguished 466 municipalities in 1836, as many of them could not provide functional government. This lasted only six years, then in 1842, Costa Cabral's regime instituted another program of centralization, which was quickly challenged by the legislative acts of Almeida Garrett, Anselmo Braamcamp, Martins Ferrão, and Dias Ferreira. An economic revitalization in 1878 finally resulted in a new program of decentralization by Rodrigues Sampaio, which included exaggerated local responsibilities and the legal means for localities to raise taxes. By 1886 there was a new centralizing tendency. Consequently, over time (even extending into the Republican era) local authorities began to be supported by subsidy and co-financed projects.

=== Civil Code ===
Portugal's civil code had been a chaotic and uncompiled system of laws since the Philippine Dynasty, and many realized that it required reform. Since early attempts to rationalize these laws failed, and a unified code based on the French Civil Code was disavowed in 1820, the Portuguese courts continued to function using the Ordenações Filipinas of 1603, which amounted to a simplified reform of the Manueline codes of 1521. A book of commentary on Portuguese law, A Propriedade: Filosofia do Direito (Property: Philosophy of Law), written by Judge António Luís de Seabra and published in 1850, was adapted in 1867 as the new Portuguese Civil Code. It was unique among European civil codes in its characterization of the law in terms of person and property; it was divided into four sections: the person, property, the acquisition of property, and the defense of that property considered as legal rights. This codification of Seabra's work would be enduring (1867–1967), and was the basis for Portuguese law regarding (in the terminology of the Code): the person as a juridical entity, promulgation of laws, property, crimes and judgments.

== Setembrismo and Cartismo ==
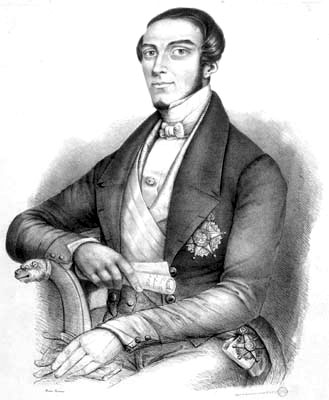
Costa Cabral, one-time radical whose interest in French doctrinaire politics, would return Chartists to power

For the first two years, the Constitutional Charter was the law of the land, but the government and the opposition could not agree: Queen Maria II replaced the government four times, then finally dissolved Parliament and called new elections to bridge the impasse. The opposition saw the charter as the source of governmental inertia and political deterioration, and wanted to return to the 1822 Liberal Constitution. These liberals were motivated by the movements in Spain, where in August 1836, a revolt by military officers (the Motín de La Granja de San Ildefonso) forced the reinstatement of the 1812 Cadiz Constitution. Ultimately, on 9 September 1836 a revolution in Lisbon by the politicized population and the National Guard to drive the Cartistas (Chartists) from power forced Queen Maria II to reinstate the 1822 Constitution. Members of the government installed following the revolution were known as Setembristas, after their short-lived movement, the Setembrismo, which was launched in September. Although this manifestation of popular sentiment was a reactionary movement against political instability and later supported by the military and burgher politicians, it was hampered by constant popular demands which paralyzed government activity.

The Queen fled to Belem to escape Septembrist control and initiated her own counter revolution, the Belenzada to restore the Charter with the support of Belgium and Britain, in exchange for territorial concessions in Africa. Despite her announcement of the resignation of the government and the garrisoning of troops, Septembrist forces threatened to march on Belém. The Belenzada (event in Belém), as it was known, failed.

In 1837, Marshals Saladanha and Terceira proclaimed the Charter in many of the garrisons of the provinces. Their ensuing revolt against the Portuguese government lasted only briefly from July to September, and resulted in only one minor engagement: the battle of Ruivães. After these events, Soares Caldeira, the civil leader of the original Setembristas, organized radical sections in the National Guard. Government forces eventually eliminated these forces on the night of 13 March 1838 in the Rossio massacre.

During its short tenure, the Septembrist movement legislated the creation of public lyceums; the foundation of the Academy of Fine Arts in Lisbon and Porto, the Medical-Surgical School in Porto and the Polytechnic School of Lisbon. The liberal revolutionaries expanded the colonies in Africa, colonizing the plateaus of Angola, and in 1836 prohibited slavery. Finally, they attempted to reconcile the various political factions by establishing a revised Constitution (1838) with a compromise between the Chartists and the Septembrists. Parliament still had two chambers, but the Upper Chamber was made up of temporary elected and appointed senators.

In 1842, a coup d'etat led by one-time radical Costa Cabral, who was influenced by French doctrinaire politics, began in Porto with royal approval. Queen Maria II ordered the reinstatement of the 1826 Charter, but little progress was made in reconciling the moderate and radical left, nor in recognition of the constituent power of the nation. When a military insurrection broke out at Torres Novas in 1844, Count Bomfim, leader of the revolutionary party, took command of the insurgents and seized the fortress of Almeida. The government suppressed the revolt after a siege of a few days, but ultimately Costa Cabrals' firm and disciplined majority could not contain an undisciplined popular revolt.

=== Maria da Fonte ===
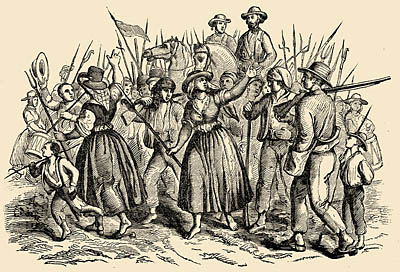
Cartoon showing an idealized Maria da Fonte leading the rebels: an idealized representation of women's roles during the peasant revolt of 1846

Unlike Septembrist initiatives that were centered on the district capitals, many of Cabral's programs affected the people of the country's interior directly. Cabral's moves once again decentralized government, placing the costs of health care, public finances and other sectors onto the tributary network, reinvoking the medieval system and subordinating local governmental authority. Two other initiatives, the forbidding of church burials and land assessment, were directly worrisome to the rural population, who were fearful of the government seizing their land rights. The revolt that occurred around the middle of April 1846 was similar to one that had occurred in Galicia, and involved a popular uprising in the parish of Fontarcada, Póvoa de Lanhoso. Although the revolt included both men and women, it was known as the Revolution of Maria da Fonte, because women were actively involved in this rural uprising: armed with carbines, pistols, torches, and stakes, the peasantry assaulted municipal buildings, burned land records, stole property and even attacked a garrison from Braga. Some even declared themselves Miguelistas, but rather for being in opposition to encroachments by the state and the imposition of taxes than as a political affirmation.

The failed Septembrist politicians, realizing the political influence that the numerous cholera-infected peasantry could have on the government, used this fact to attack Cabral's government. They succeeded in forcing Cabral's removal and exile, but the queen assembled a larger, more loyal cadre of Cabralist politicians around her new government, headed by the Duke of Saldanha.

=== Patuleia ===
Meanwhile, the peasant uprising was co-opted by an undisciplined band of political and military elements backed by the small merchant class, pitting the Septembrists against the Cartistas in a civil war known as the Patuleia, similar to what occurred in the French 1848 Revolution and the Second Republic. Although social conditions were different, an unnatural coalition of Septembrists and Miguelist sympathizers was reacting to the doctrinaire liberalism and neo-aristocratic avarice of the Cabralist politicians. Their forces installed themselves in Porto, declared a provisional government and attempted to march on Lisbon. The "soldiers", without strong ideological convictions, wavered in their political ideology, sometimes trading sides. Nevertheless, the civil war between the competing armies spread to all parts of the country, and only foreign intervention could stop the bloodletting. The popular uprising was brutally suppressed by government forces, and the war ended in a clear Cartista victory, with opposition troops being imprisoned. The Convention of Gramido, an agreement that included amnesty for the Septembrists, was signed in Porto on 29 June 1847.

== Regeneration ==
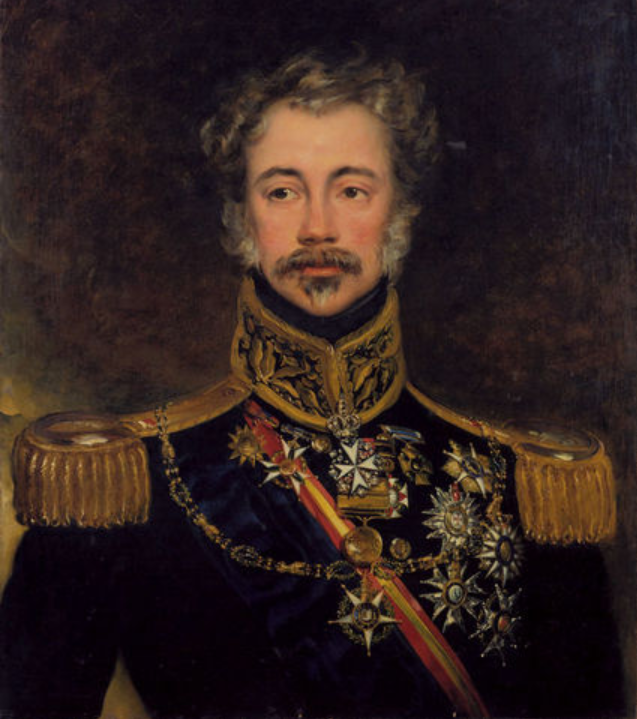
Marshal Saldanha, responsible for seven coup d'etats in his career after the Liberal Wars

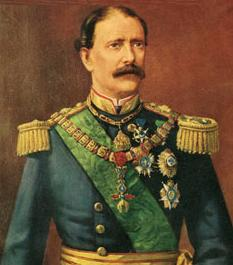
Fontes Pereira de Melo, an important politician in the period of rotativism politics

Between 1847 and 1851 nothing politically notable happened: nothing was legislated, there were few conflicts and parliament convened routinely. Costa Cabral's return from exile marked the only scandal of note when he received a carriage in exchange for a purchase. The last true conflict of this period was less a revolution and more a personal conflict. Marshal Saldanha, a Liberal commander in the Liberal Wars and leader against the Patuleia forces, finding himself sidelined in the new political order, began a revolt in the military headquarters at Sintra. Few supported him, and worse for his cause, he found only disappointment in successive cities (Mafra, Coimbra, Viseu, and Porto). Finally, while he was a refugee in Galicia, the former commander was acclaimed by regiments in Porto, and he returned to enthusiastic support at the São João Theatre. His movement was a self-styled Regeneração (Regeneration) of the political order in reaction to a corrupt system; the queen, worried that Saldanha would attract new adherents and thus plunge the nation once again into a civil war, decided to bring him into the fold, and installed him in government.

=== Rotativism ===
Consequently, Portuguese politics entered a period of tacit coexistence between the parties. While the Constitutional Charter did not change, the processes of government were modified: elections were made by direct suffrage, while Parliament could appoint commissions of inquiry into governmental acts. A wave of enthusiasm for national reconciliation swept the country, Cabral went again into exile and the country embarked on a program of internal improvements directed by Minister Fontes Pereira de Melo.

Chartists and non-Chartists transformed into the Partido Regenerador (Regenerator Party) and the Partido Histórico (Historic Party), respectively, while later the reinvented Septembrists formed the Partido Progressista (Progressive Party). These two parties, Regenerador and Histórico, were centrist (i.e., center-right and center-left respectively) "liberal" organizations led by politicians dedicated to the monarchy and interested in economic reconstruction and solving the deepening financial crisis. Yet the years following 1868 were marked by continuous political disorder, although alliances were possible, and the preference for material progress and extensive public works damaged the State's finances: it was an illusory Regenerationist peace.

This coalition against radicalism lasted until 1868, when insurmountable financial difficulties, turmoil in the streets and Parliament, and a succession of incompetent governments once again forced Saldanha to impose his will. Along with the army, he established a supra-party dictatorship in 1870 in order to impose political reforms, but he was never able to see that they had failed.

In 1890, the British government sent Portugal an ultimatum requiring immediate withdrawal of Portuguese troops from East and South Africa, from the territories some of which Portugal administered for centuries. The Portuguese government complied, which was widely seen by the population as a national humiliation.

== Regicide of King Carlos I ==
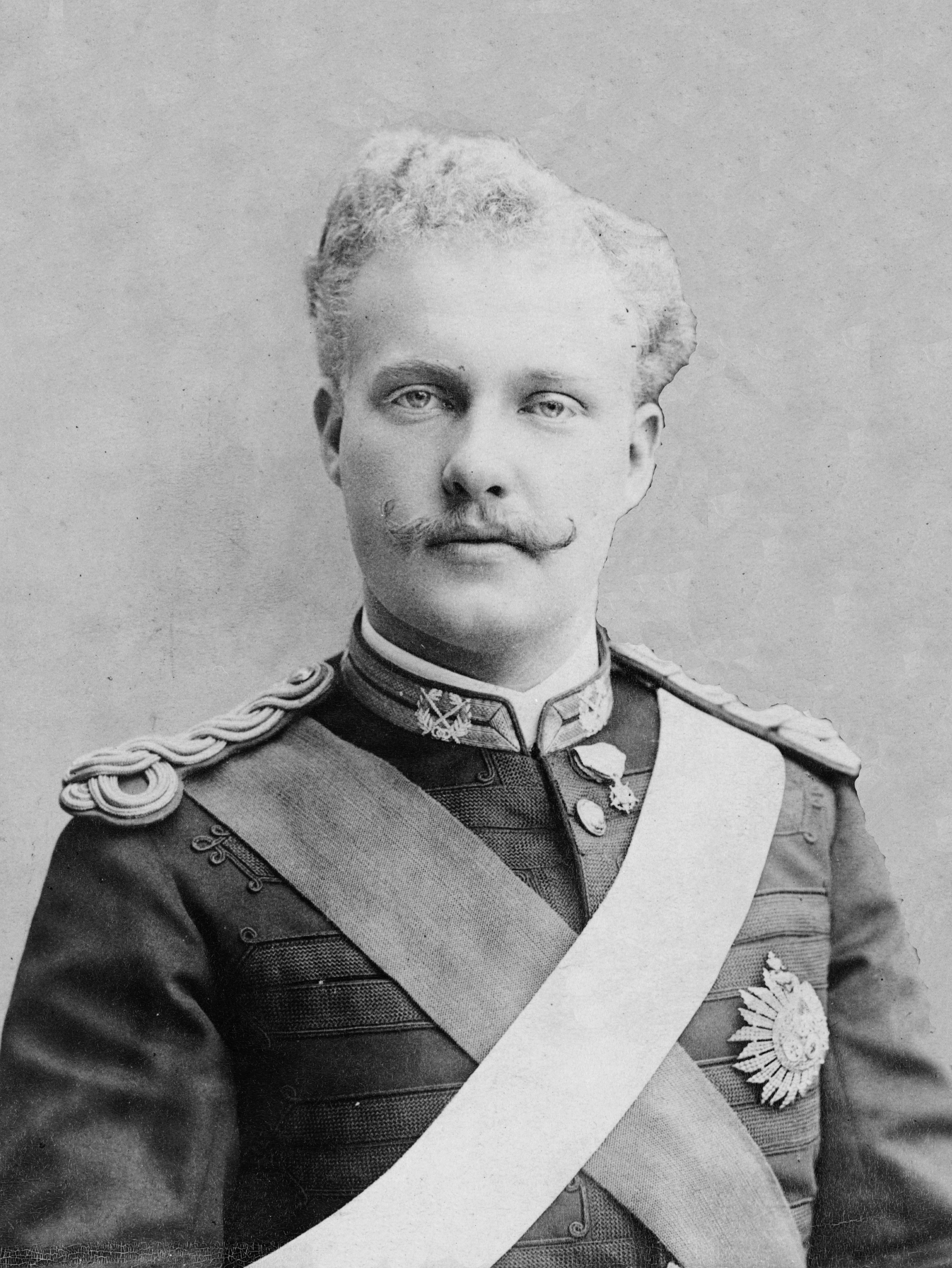
King Carlos I was murdered in the Lisbon Regicide, in 1908.

On 1 February 1908 King Carlos I and the royal family returned to Lisbon from Vila Viçosa. After leaving the train in Barreiro and traveling by boat to Lisbon, they were met in the city center by members of the court, Franco government (including the Prime Minister) and some royalist citizens. Returning to the royal palace, their landau passed through the Terreiro do Paço, where two republican activists, Alfredo Luís da Costa and Manuel Buíça, fired on the open carriage in which they were traveling. Five bullets were fired from a rifle carried by Buíça (a former army sergeant), hidden under his long overcoat: three of these struck and killed the king, while another fatally wounded the heir to the throne Luís Filipe. During the turmoil the police killed the two assassins, as well as an unfortunate bystander. The royal carriage was driven to the nearby Naval Arsenal, where both the king and the prince were declared dead. Manuel, the king's youngest son, was quickly acclaimed King of Portugal.

Manuel II would reign for only a short time, as republican forces continued to attack the monarchy and its institutions, even though the young king was considered a popular monarch. His unexpected accession to the throne (18 years of age), was marked by the brutal murder of his father and brother, yet his reign was pragmatic and respected the principles of the constitutional monarchy. Despite threats from the ultra-militant members of the Republican Party and the Carbonária, King Manuel courageously took responsibility for upholding the institutions of the State and the rule of law.

Although Manuel II was concerned with the Questão Social (Social Issues) of the day (the working class, social reform, and social security programs) he would have little time to enact many new initiatives.

== 5 October Revolution ==
After general elections on 28 August 1910, Republican party representation had grown only to 14 deputies in the Chamber of Deputies, the lower house of the Cortes. Even with support from other pro-republican parties, the Republicans were only able to muster closer to 40 seats in the Chamber, in comparison to the 120 pro-monarchist deputies. Nevertheless, these governments tended to be unstable, and during his reign Manuel II changed the government seven times.

Militant Republicans and their allies in the Carbonária were not willing to remain in the shadows of the constitutional monarchy. Between 4–5 October 1910, members of the Carbonária, republican youth, and elements of the army instigated a coup d'état against the already weak constitutional monarchy. The young king and his family, after a few miscues, escaped from the Palace in Mafra to exile in England. On the morning of 5 October 1910, the Republic was declared from the balcony of Lisbon City Hall, ending eight centuries of monarchy in Portugal.

== See also ==
- Portuguese campaigns of pacification and occupation
