= Passos Manuel =

Portuguese jurist and politician

His Excellency Manuel da Silva Passos
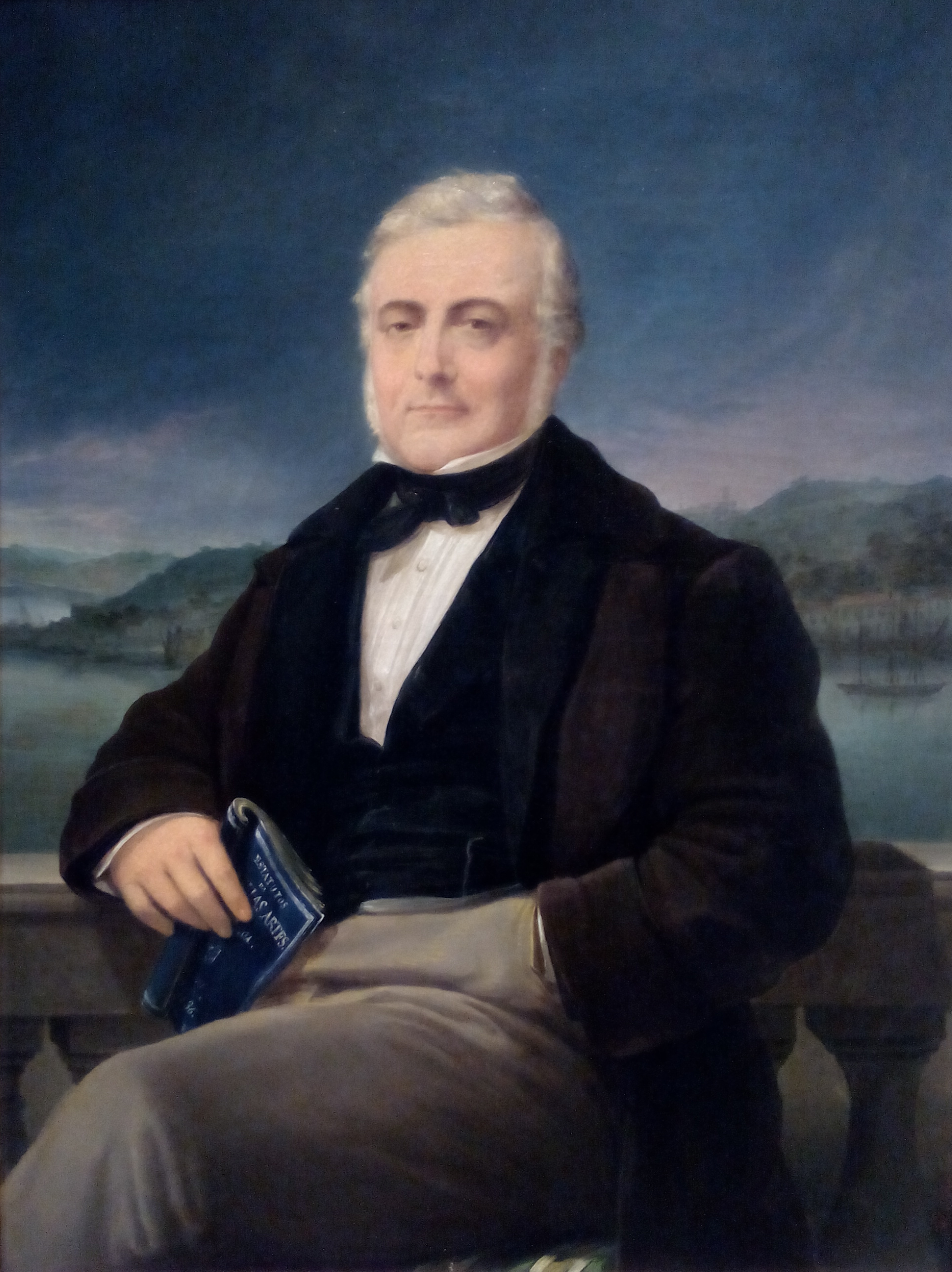

Minister and Secretary of State of the Affairs of the Kingdom
- In office 5 November 1836 – 1 June 1837
- Monarch: Maria II
- Prime Minister: The Viscount Sá da Bandeira
- Preceded by: The Viscount Banho (not sworn-in)
- Succeeded by: António Dias de Oliveira
- In office 10 September 1836 – 4 November 1836
- Monarch: Maria II
- Prime Minister: The Count of Lumiares
- Preceded by: Agostinho José Freire
- Succeeded by: The Viscount Banho (not sworn-in)

Personal details
- Born: 5 January 1801 Matosinhos, Portugal
- Died: 16 January 1862 (aged 61) Santarém, Portugal
- Party: Septemberist
- Spouse: Gervásia Joaquina Farinha de Sousa Falcão (m. 1838)
- Occupation: Lawyer, politician

Manuel da Silva Passos (5 January 1801 – 16 January 1862) was a Portuguese jurist and politician, one of the most notable personalities of 19th-century Portuguese Liberalism. He is more commonly referred to as Passos Manuel, due to the way he was addressed in Parliament, where members were announced by their surname — "Manuel" being apposed to his surname in order to distinguish him from his brother, José da Silva Passos (Passos José), who was also a member of Parliament.

Following the September Revolution in 1836, Passos Manuel served briefly as Minister of the Kingdom, in which capacity he oversaw an intense legislative effort to modernise Portuguese education and culture, resulting in the creation of many institutions that now recognise him as their founder or reformer: the creation of public lyceums; the establishment of the Academy of Fine Arts in Lisbon and Porto; the creation of the parliamentary library; the reform of the Medico-Surgical Schools in Lisbon and Porto and the Lisbon Polytechnic School and the Porto Polytechnic Academy. Also notably, he entrusted Almeida Garrett with drawing up a plan to promote national theatre, which resulted in the creation of Queen Maria II National Theatre and the National Conservatory of Dramatic Art. He also introduced the 1836 Administrative Code, the first of its kind in Portugal.

A declaration of principles written by Passos Manuel became famous: "I am a Minister of the Queen — the Queen is the head of the whole nation. And before I was for the Left, I was for the Fatherland. The Fatherland is my policy."

He married Gervásia Joaquina Farinha de Sousa Falcão on 28 December 1838, and they had two daughters: Beatriz de Passos Manuel, who was granted the title of Viscountess of Passos by King Peter V in 1861 as a reward for her father's services; and Antónia de Passos Manuel, who married Pedro de Sousa Canavarro, grandson of the 1st Baron of Arcossô.

== See also ==
- Belenzada
- Rossio massacre
