= Senate (Portugal) =

Upper house of the Parliament of Portugal, 1838–1842 and 1911–1933

Senate Senado

Type
- Type: Upper house

History
- Founded: 1838 (first time), 1911 (second time)
- Disbanded: 1842 (first time), 1933 (second time)
- Preceded by: Chamber of Peers of Portugal
- Succeeded by: Corporative Chamber

Elections
- Voting system: Limited Voting using the portuguese Districts and colonies (second senate)

Meeting place
- São Bento Palace; Lisbon, Portugal

The Senate (Portuguese: Senado) was the upper house of the Parliament of Portugal during the periods of validity of the Constitution of 1838 (1838-1842) and of the Constitution of 1911 (1911-1933).

== First Senate (1838–1842) ==
The Chamber of Senators (Câmara dos Senadores) or Senate was the upper house of the Cortes Gerais - the legislature of the Portuguese Constitutional Monarchy -, during the period in which the Constitution of 1838 was in force. It replaced the previous Chamber of the Peers, which was the upper house during the period of the Constitutional Charter of 1826. When the Constitutional Charter was restored in 1842, the Chamber of Peers was also restored and the Senate disbanded.

== Second Senate (1911–1933) ==
The Senate of the Republic (Senado da República) was the upper house of the Congress of the Republic, the legislature of the First Portuguese Republic. The Senate was elected for a six-year term, but the terms of senators of the Republic were staggered to allow elections every three years (alongside elections to the Chamber of Deputies). The first senate was elected by the National Constituent Assembly, but later senates were elected by the people. Initially, the Senate included senators representing Nationwide party lists and other senators representing districts and colonies. During the erstwhile "New Republic" of Sidónio Pais in 1918, additional senators represented special interests: agriculture, industry, commerce, public services, "liberal professions", arts and sciences. Although the Chamber of Deputies was the dominant house of the Congress, the Senate had the power of approving or rejecting nominations of colonial governors and high commissioners.

== Other historic uses in Portugal ==
The term "senate" was used, in the past, as an alternative designation of the municipal government bodies of some main cities of Portugal and of the Portuguese Empire, otherwise known as câmaras (chambers, also translated as "municipal councils"). In 1832, the designation of all municipal councils was standardized as câmara municipal (municipal chamber). A notable exception was the Municipal Council of Macau, which was able to maintain its traditional title Leal Senado (Loyal Senate), bestowed to it in 1810, until the handover of Macau to Chinese administration in 1999.

During the 1913-1936 period, a number of councillors of each câmara municipal formed an executive commission which constituted the executive body of the municipality, with the plenary of the councillors constituting a deliberative assembly occasionally referred to as "municipal senate".
