= Juiz de fora (office) =

Circuit Judge

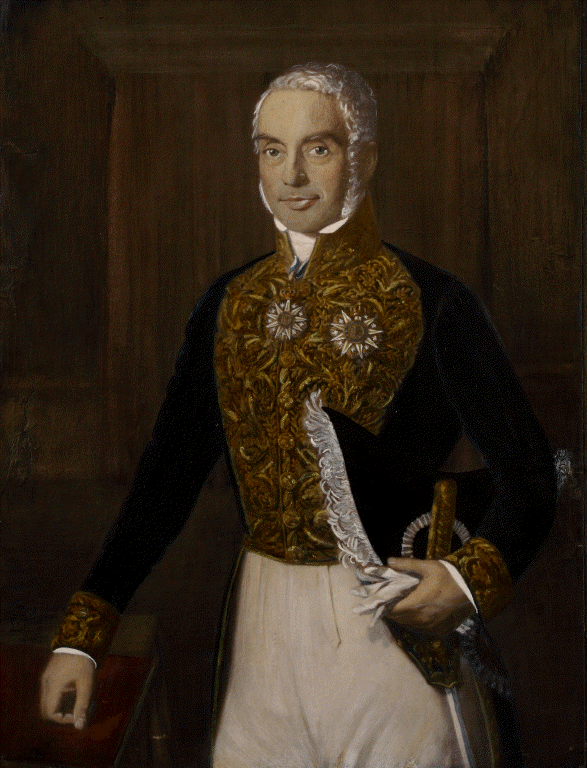
João Baptista Felgueiras, a juiz de fora in Viana do Castelo

A juiz de fora (pronounced [ˈʒwiʒ ðɨ ˈfɔɾɐ]; lit. 'judge from the outside' or 'outsider judge') was a magistrate appointed by the King of Portugal to serve in the municipalities where the intervention of an impartial and unbiased judge - usually from outside of the town - was necessary. Often, the judges also assumed a political role, being appointed to preside over municipal councils (câmaras) in order to provide some central control.

== History ==
The office arose in Portugal in 1327, under King Afonso IV, as a type of itinerant magistrate, appointed by the Crown. His main function was to ensure compliance with the Law on behalf of the King. The authority of the juiz de fora was far superior to that of ordinary local judges.

The appointment of a juiz de fora was justified by the need for a truly free, impartial judge, brought in from outside of the town to guarantee fair trials judge. The position could not be exercised at the place of origin or habitual residence of the magistrate, nor were they allowed other links with the local population such as marriage or close friendship.

As part of the process of formation of the structure of the Portuguese State, the Crown invested in the strength of the municipalities and local authorities, in order to weaken the hold of feudal lords.

The final consolidation of the office was carried out by King John III in 1532 who undertook a major centralization programme. By 1580, when the Iberian Union emerged with the reign of Philip I of Portugal (Philip II of Spain), there were more than fifty Portuguese municipalities governed by juízes de fora.

The office was also later created in the Portuguese Overseas territories, specially in Brazil. In the areas of difficult access and administration of Brazil, the office of juiz de fora was used as a means of control to prevent the adoption of measures conflicting with the interests of the Crown.

After the Restoration of the Independence, the Kingdom of Portugal concentrated all its effort in consolidating the newly recovered power, looking not to start unnecessary conflicts and Brazilian municipalities maintained their autonomy until the last years of the seventeenth century. The first juiz de fora in Brazil was appointed in 1696 in Salvador, beginning a transition phase that would last for over a hundred years.

The office was abolished after the establishment of the Constitutional Monarchy and the resulting separation of the executive and judicial powers. The judicial functions of the former juízes de fora were assumed by juízes de direito (judges of law), who do not have any political or administrative functions.

== See also ==
- Desembargador
