= Portuguese Constitution of 1838 =

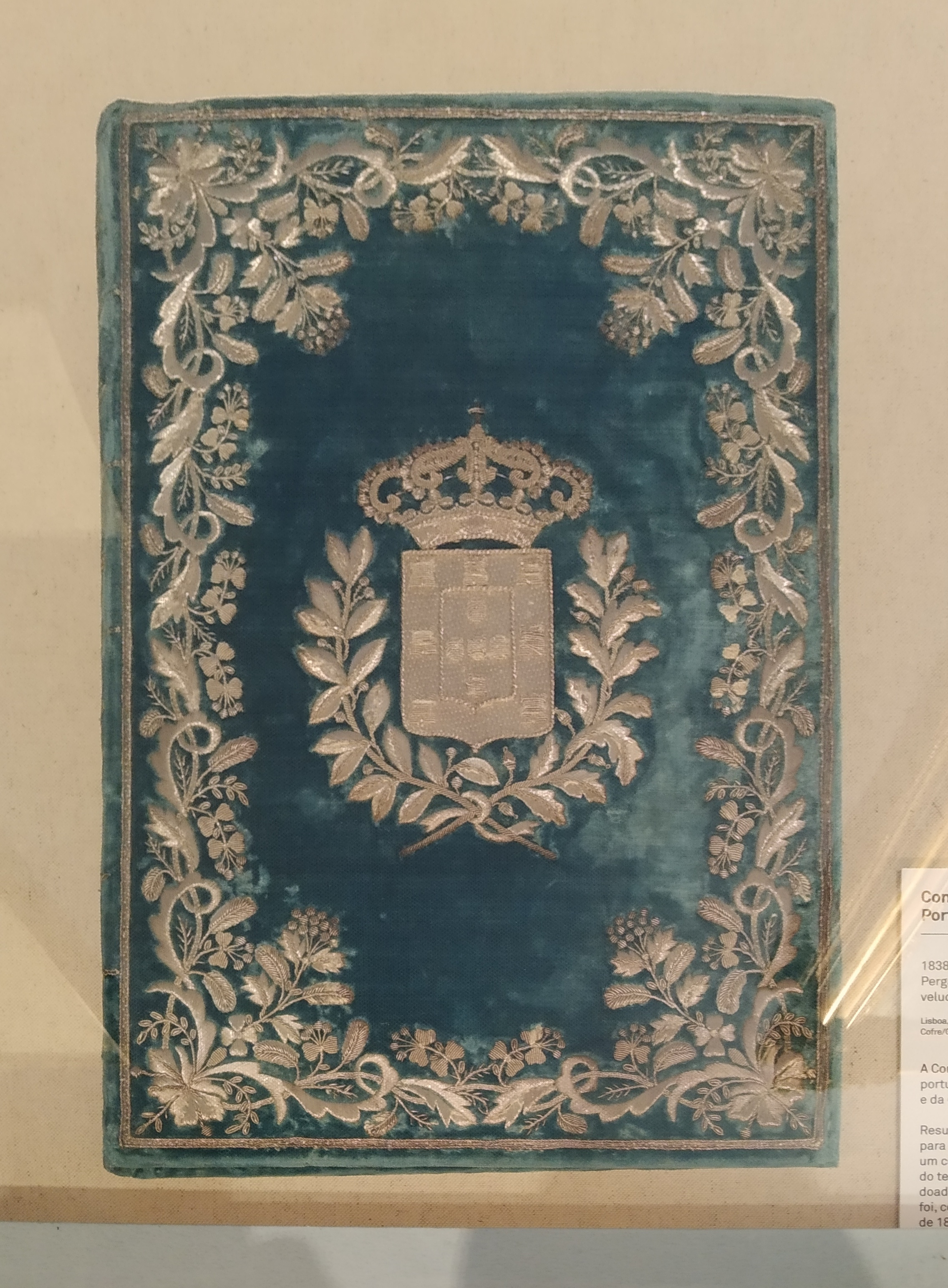
Book of Portuguese Constitution of 1838

The Political Constitution of the Portuguese Monarchy (Constituição Política da Monarquia Portuguesa) of 1838 was the third Portuguese constitution.

After the September Revolution in 1836, the Constitutional Charter of 1826 was abolished and in its place the Constitution of 1822 was temporarily restored, while a constituent Cortes was convened to produce a new constitution. This was agreed, and Maria II swore an oath to it on 4 April 1838. It was a synthesis of the previous constitution of 1822 and 1826, with the establishment of an elected Senate rather than a House of Peers also drawn from the 1831 Constitution of Belgium and the Spanish Constitution of 1837. The French constitution of 1830 was also a source of influence.

Its main features were the separation of legislative, judiciary and executive powers, a two chamber (Senate and Chamber of Representatives), the royal veto and administrative decentralisation. In addition, article 98 excluded from the royal succession the absolutist pretender Miguel I and all his successors (Miguelistas). It re-established direct and universal suffrage. The 1838 constitution was also the first in Portugal to recognise the right to freedom of assembly.

The constitution was only briefly in effect. On his arrival in Porto on 10 February 1842 Costa Cabral was hailed with popular calls for the return of the Constitutional Charter of 1826, which he restored following a coup d’état on his return to Lisbon.
