= Chamber of Most Worthy Peers =

Upper chamber of the Kingdom of Portugal legislature

Chamber of the Most Worthy Peers of the Realm Câmara dos Digníssimos Pares do Reino
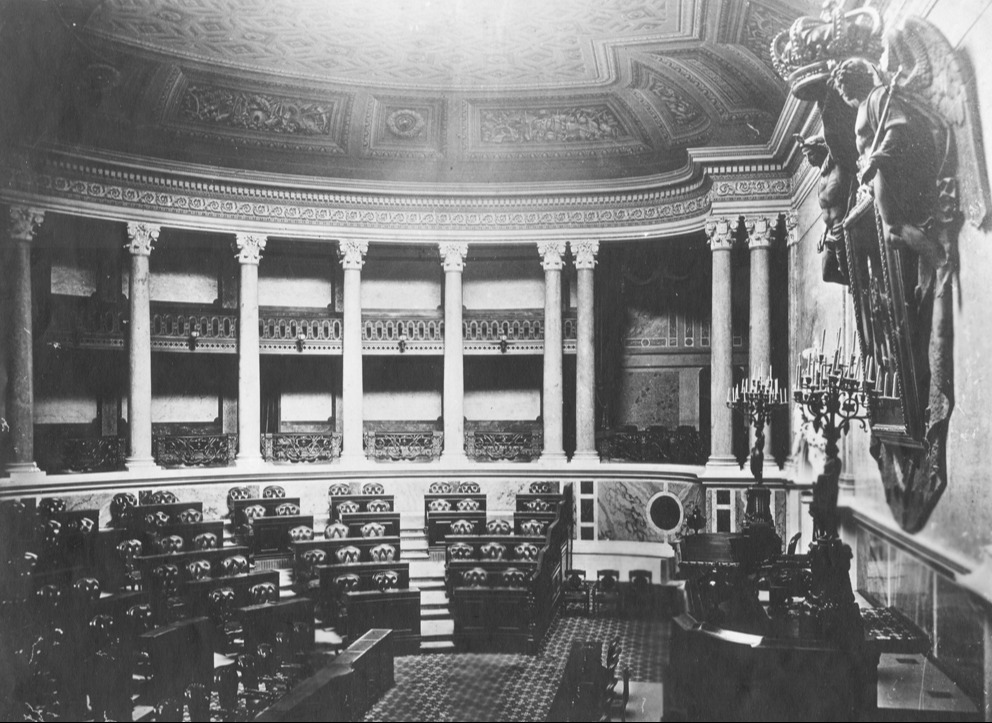

Type
- Type: Upper house of the Cortes Gerais

History
- Founded: 1826
- Disbanded: 1910

Leadership
- First President (Lord Speaker) of the Chamber: Nuno Caetano Álvares Pereira de Melo, 6th Duke of Cadaval
- Last President (Lord Speaker) of the Chamber: Gonçalo Pereira da Silva de Sousa e Menezes, 3rd Count of Bertiandos
- Seats: 90

Meeting place
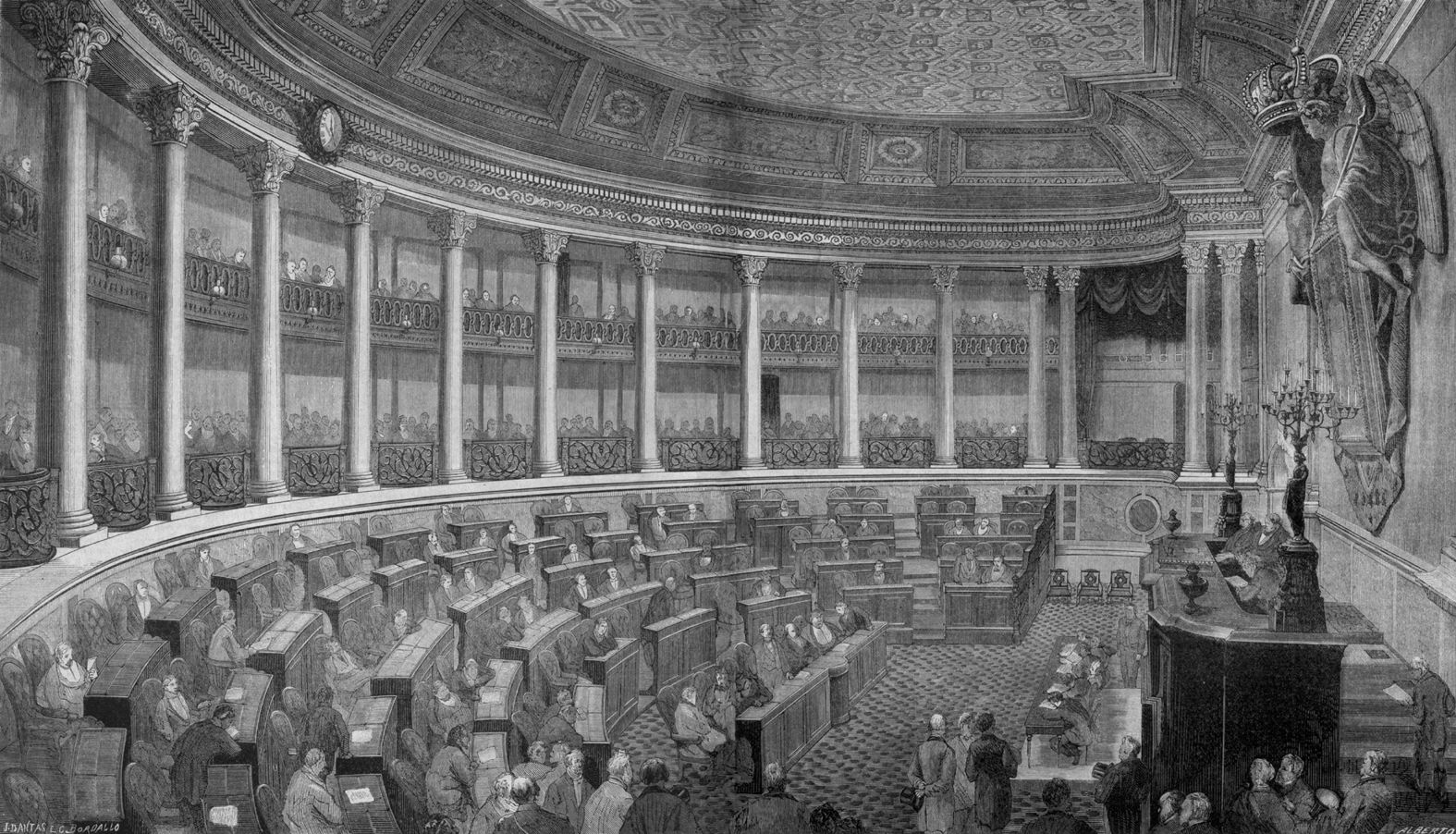
- São Bento Palace; Lisbon, Kingdom of Portugal

The Chamber of Peers of Portugal, alternatively translatable as the House of Lords and formally styled the Chamber of the Most Worthy Peers of the Realm (Portuguese: Câmara dos Pares or Câmara dos Digníssimos Pares do Reino), was the upper house of the Cortes Gerais, the legislature of the Kingdom of Portugal during most of the constitutional monarchy period. Members of the Chamber were Peers of the Realm, appointed directly at the pleasure of the Portuguese monarch.

== History ==
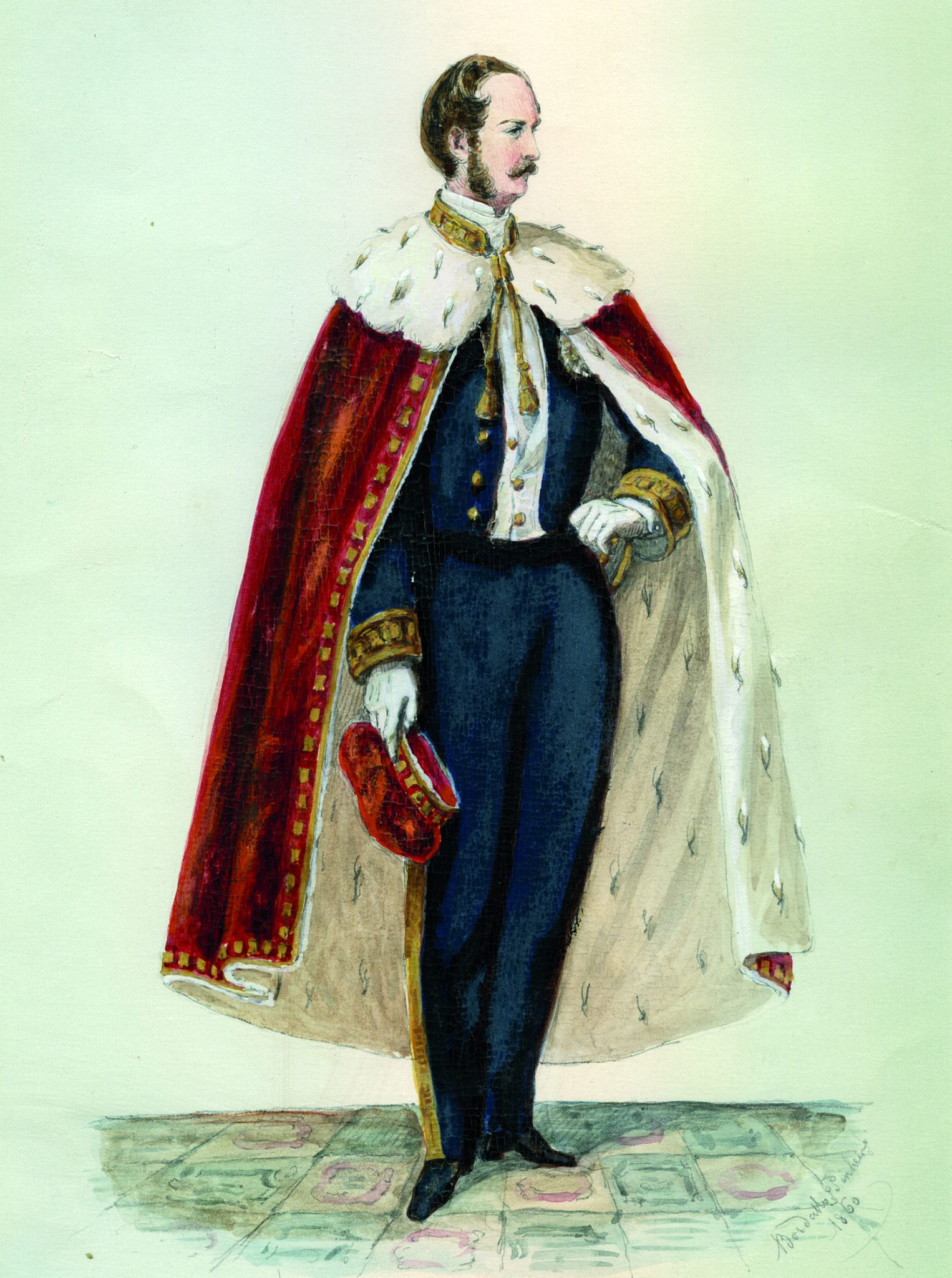
The ceremonial robes and uniform of Peers of the Realm while the Chamber was in session; 1860.

It was established before the Liberal Wars. It was composed of 90 peers who did not have a hereditary right to sit by descent, but were nominated by the monarch.

The Chamber existed from 1826-1838 and again from 1842-1910, when it was known as the Chamber of Peers of the Realm (Câmara dos Pares do Reino).

One of the members was The 1st Duke of Albuquerque (1815-1890).

The Chamber met at the São Bento Palace. The successor of the Chamber was the Senate.
