= Timeline of Portuguese history =

This is a timeline of Portuguese history, comprising important legal and territorial changes and political events in Portugal and its predecessor states. To read about the background to these events, see History of Portugal.

Throughout recorded history, the lands that belong to modern-day mainland Portugal were part of three main lines of political authority (sometimes simultaneously):

- the Roman Republic (3rd century BC to 1st century BC), the Roman Empire (1st century BC to 5th century), and the Byzantine Empire (6th to 7th centuries);
- the Suebi Kingdom (5th to 6th centuries), the Visigothic Kingdom (5th to 8th centuries), the Kingdom of Asturias (8th century to 10th century), the Kingdom of Galicia (9th to 12th century), and the Kingdom of Léon (10th to 12th century);
- the Umayaad Caliphate (8th century), the Emirate and later Caliphate of Córdoba (8th to 10th centuries), various taifas during the Taifa Period (11th century), and the Abbasid Caliphate (through the Almoravids, 11th to 13th century).

Portugal became independent from the Kingdom of Léon as the Kingdom of Portugal (12th to 20th centuries) as a result of the Portuguese Reconquista (8th to 12th centuries), expanded outside mainland Portugal in the Portuguese Discoveries (15th and 16th centuries), was united with the Kingdom of Spain due to a succession crisis (16th to 17th centuries), split from Spain in the aftermath of the Portuguese Restoration War (17th century) and lost Brazil when the Portuguese Prince declared its independence from Portugal (19th century). Portugal then became a constitutional monarchy alternating between three different constitutions: the 1822 Constitution, the Constitutional Charter of 1826, and the Portuguese Constitution of 1838 (19th century), until it finally became a Republic (20th century to modern-day) under three forms: the first Portuguese Republic, the Estado Novo, and the current Portuguese Republic. In the latter Republic, Portugal granted independence to all of its overseas possessions acquired in the Discoveries, except for Macau (handed over to China in 1999) and the nearby archipelagos of Azores and Madeira, which are autonomous regions of Portugal.

== 3rd century BC ==
Year	Date	Event
218 to 201 BC		The Second Punic War would bring the Roman Republic's influence to Iberia. The Roman conquest of the Iberian Peninsula begins.

== 2nd century BC ==
Year	Date	Event
197 BC		The Iberian Peninsula is divided into Hispania Ulterior (which will include all of Portugal) and Hispania Citerior.
155 BC		Resistance to the Roman conquest by the Lusitanians starts in the Lusitanian War.
148 BC		Viriathus becomes the Lusitanian leader.
140 BC		After being defeated by Fabius Maximus Caepius, Viriathus sends his most trusted friends Audax, Ditalcus and Minurus to negotiate peace terms with Caepio. They are bribed by Caepius to kill Viriathus and do. After the death of Viriathus, the Lusitanians attempt to raid Saguntum, but fail. On crossing the river Baetis on their return, they are defeated by Caepio and accept to become Rome's subjects. This marks the end of the Lusitanian War.

== 1st century BC ==
Year	Date	Event
80 to 72 BC		The Sertorian War takes place, with Quintus Sertorius, a Roman general, rebelling against Rome with the support of the Lusitanians.
27 BC		The Roman Republic is over and the Roman Empire begins in the aftermath of the War of Actium, in which Augustus wins and becomes Emperor. He replaces the old Hispania Ulterior and Citerior division with a new one: Lusitania (Centre and South of modern Portugal and some territory of Modern Spain, namely the capital of Lusitania, Mérida), Hispania Baetica (only territories in Modern Spain, mostly around Seville), and everything else, including the North of Portugal, in Hispania Tarraconensis.

== 3rd century ==
Year	Date	Event
293		Diocletian reorganises the provinces of Hispania, creating some new ones. Of interest, Gallaecia is split from the Tarraconensis province. Gallaecia includes the North of Portugal (starting with Portus Cale/Porto) and extending to the North of Spain (Galicia). Bracara Augusta (Braga) is the administrative centre of Conventus Bracarensis, one of the three conventus of Gallaecia.

== 4th century ==
Year	Date	Event
357		Potamius, the first recorded bishop of Lisbon, takes part in the Councils of Sirmium, in which he is recorded as having defended Arianism.

== 5th century ==
Year	Date	Event
409		In the context of the Migration Period, the Kingdom of the Suebi is established with King Hermeric, a believer of Germanic paganism, as its leader and Braga as its capital. The Kingdom includes Gallaecia and varying other parts of Portugal. Other groups that enter the Portuguese area are the Germanic Vandals, led by Gunderic, and the Iranic Alans, led by Respendial.
416		In the first Gothic War in Spain (416–418), the Western Roman Empire commissions the Visigoths to take back Spain for the Roman Empire from the Suebi and Alans.
418		The first Gothic War in Spain ends, with a win for the Visigoths and Rome, who take back a considerable portion of the Iberian Peninsula, with the Kingdom of Suebi being restricted to the North of Spain (Gallecia). Attaces, who had taken over leadership of the Alans from Respendial (date unknown), is killed in battle. The Alans appealed to Gunderic, King of the Vandals, who then became also king of the Alans.
409-418		Cindazunda, daughter of King Hermeric, marries Attaces, King of the Alans as part of a peace deal after a battle in Coimbra.
419		Asterius, a Roman general, campaigns in Gallecia to suppress an uprising by Maximus and a war between Suebi against the Vandals and Alans.
428		Following Gunderic's death, Gaiseric, his half-brother, becomes King of the Vandals and Alans.
429		Gaiseric leads the Vandals and Alans out of Iberia and into North Africa. They would later conquer many islands in the Mediterranean Sea and go on to sack Rome but would not return to Iberia.
438		Rechila, King of the Suebi, leads several campaigns against the Romans and Visigoths.
439		Emerita Augusta, capital of Lusitania, is captured by Recila, ending its Roman rule.
456		The second Gothic War in Spain (456) takes place between the Suebi (led by Rechila's son, Rechiar) and the Romans, Visigoths, Franks and Burgundians. Rechiar flees to Porto, where he is killed. The Battle of Órbigo culminates with the sacking of (Suebi) Braga and nearby cities.
c. 468		Hydatius, bishop of Aquae Flaviae, finishes writing his Chronicon, a chronicle written in Latin which is our only contemporary source for the history of Hispania between 427 and 468.

== 6th century ==
Year	Date	Event
506	2 February	The Breviary of Alaric is published by the order of Alaric II, King of the Visigoths. This collection of Roman law applied, not to the Visigothic nobles who lived under their own law, but to the Hispano-Roman and Gallo-Roman population, living under Visigoth rule.
550		Around this year, Martin of Braga, who played an important role in the conversion of the Suevi from Arianism to Chalcedonianism, settles in Gallecia.
552		Emperor Justinian I, of the Byzantine Empire, establishes the province of Spania. In its greatest extent, Spania would include parts of modern-day Algarve.
561		The First Council of Braga takes place, taking aim at Priscillianism, a Christian sect that had emerged in Spain.
585		King Liuvigild of the Visigothic Kingdom (capital in Toletum), an Arian, conquers the Suevi Kingdom, thus controlling most of the Iberian Peninsula (and all of Portugal).
586		King Liuvigild dies and is followed by his son, Reccared I.
587		King Reccared I renounces Arianism for Chalcedonianism and suppresses several Arian revolts in his kingdom.
589		In the Third Council of Toledo, the Visigothic Kingdom joins the Catholic Church. The bishops of Viseu and of Porto attend the council.

== 7th century ==
Year	Date	Event
601		King Reccared I dies and is succeeded by his son, Liuva II.
602	Spring	Witteric, who had been involved as a conspirator in the Arian uprisings of 585, is given command to lead the Visigothic army against the Byzantine Empire. Instead, he has Liuva II executed and becomes King of the Visigoths.
610	April	King Witteric is murdered by a faction of Catholic nobles. They proclaim Gundemar as King of the Visigoths.
612	February / March	King Gundemar dies of natural causes. He is succeeded by Sisebut. He took back most of the province of Spania from Byzantine control, except for the Algarve and would persecute Jews.
621	February	Upon the death of King Sisebut, his young son takes the throne as Reccared II. The length of the reign exactly is debated to last from several days to just over a year, Reccared II dies and Suintila, son of Reccared I, takes the throne.
624		King Suintila takes back Algarve, ending the Byzantine presence in Iberia.
631	26 March	A rebellion over confiscations of lands and distribution of privileges between the nobility and clergy results in King Suintila being deposed and Sisenand proclaiming himself King of the Visigoths.
632		There was an attempted uprising within the kingdom, led by Iudila, but the revolution failed and Iudila was later killed.
633		King Sisenand convened the IV Council of Toledo. The Council did not grant him hereditary rights.
636	12 March	King Sisenand dies of natural causes, Chintila succeeds him.
636	30 June	King Chintilla convenes the Fifth Council of Toledo in an attempt to bring political stability.
638	9 January	King Chintilla convenes the Sixth Council of Toledo in a second attempt to create internal stability.
639/641		King Chintilla dies and is succeeded by his son Tulga.
642		Chindasuinth, a veteran of the Liuvigild campaigns, is elected by the Visigothic nobles as the King of the Visigoths.
646	18 November	King Chindasuinth convenes the Seventh Council of Toledo. Its main aim was to further harden the laws against treason.
649	20 January	King Chindasuinth proclaims his son, Recceswinth, as co-king in yet another attempt to establish a hereditary monarchy in the Visigothic Kingdom.
653	16 December	King Chindasuinth, and his co-king son, convene the Eighth Council of Toledo.
653		King Chindasuinth dies, leaving his son Recceswinth as sole king.
654		King Recceswinth published the Visigothic Code, which abolished the old tradition of having different laws for Romans (leges romanae) and Visigoths (leges barbarorum), and under it all the subjects of the Visigothic kingdom would stop being romani and gothi instead becoming hispani.
656		King Recceswinth summons the Tenth Council of Toledo.
672		King Recceswinth dies and is succeeded by Wamba. He would face a revolt from Hilderic of Nîmes that he would successfully deal with.
675		The Third Council of Braga and the Eleventh Council of Toledo are held.
680		Erwig succeeds Wamba as the King of the Visigoths.
681	9 January	The Twelfth Council of Toledo is summoned by Erwig to legitimize his power. It also revised the Visigothic Code and oppressed Jews.
683	4 November	The Thirteenth Council of Toledo is convened, pardoning the rebels against King Wamba and King Chintila.
684	14 November	The Fourteenth Council of Toledo is convened, in response to a request by Pope Leo II to confirm the decisions of the ecumenical Third Council of Constantinople against monothelitism. The Council confirms the decisions of the Constantinople Council.
687	14 November	King Erwig dies and appoints Egica, his son-in-law, as the successor King of the Visigoths.
688		King Egica summons the Fifteenth Council of Toledo to reaffirm the XIV Council of Toledo and to release him from the duty to protect Erwig's children. The Council releases Egica from his oath to Erwig to protect his children, but do not revert the protection they had due to the XIII Council of Toledo, as King Egica had hoped.
693		Sisebert, the metropolitan of Toledo, led a rebellion against Egica in favor of raising a man named Suniefred to the throne. The rebellion would fail.
693	25 April	King Egica summons the Sixteenth Council of Toledo to punish the rebellion of the previous year. The council also altered the Visigothic code, including laws repressing Jews and homosexuality.
694		King Egica appoints his son, Wittiza, as co-ruler.

== 8th century ==
Year	Date	Event
c. 702		King Egica dies, leaving his son Wittiza as sole ruler.
710		Roderic, often known as the last king of the Visigoths (although officially that title belongs to Ardo), a grandson of Chindaswinth, usurps the throne. The Visigothic kingdom breaks into two factions, one (the provinces of Lusitania and western Carthaginiensis around the capital Toledo) in support of Roderic, the other in support of Achila II.
711		The Umayyad conquest of Hispania begins with Tariq ibn Ziyad crossing the Strait of Gibraltar and entering the Visigothic Kingdom. King Roderic of the Visigoths dies in the Battle of Guadalete. By 716, most of the Iberian Peninsula is under Islamic rule.
714		Abd al-Aziz ibn Musa becomes Governor of al-Andalus, with al-Andalus constituting a single province within the Umayyad Caliphate. Al-Andalus was formally a province subordinate to the Umayyad governor of Kairouan in Ifriqiya, rather than directly dependent on the Umayyad Caliph in Damascus, with Kairouan appointing most of the governors of al-Andalus.
718 or 722		Following the Battle of Covadonga, the Visigothic nobleman Pelagius of Asturias founds the Kingdom of Asturias. He begins the Astur-Leonese dynasty.
737		Pelagius dies and Favila of Asturias, his only son, becomes King of the Asturias.
739		Favila is killed by a bear in a hunt and is succeeded by his brother-in-law, Alfonso I of Asturias, who had married Pelagius' daughter Ermesinda.
740		Alfonso I of Asturias conquers Galicia, taking advantage of the Berber Revolt. The Berber revolt started in Tanger, led by Maysara al-Matghari, over unequal taxation treatment of Berber converts to Islam.
741	October	The Berber Revolt expands into Iberia, with a mutiny by Berber garrisons on the Douro who form a rebel army and march South. This allowed Alfonso I to expand his kingdom southward.
743		The Berber revolt ends, with a limited victory for the Berber who establish independent Berber polities in the western and central Maghreb. They had failed to take Iberia, but managed to cut if off from the rest of the Umayyad caliphate. Syrian troops who helped fight against the rebels remain in Iberia.
750		Yusuf ibn Abd al-Rahman al-Fihri, who had been appointed governor of al-Andalus in 747, rules independently, given the collapse of the Umayyad rule following the Abbasid revolution.
755	September	A Umayyad prince, Abd al-Rahman I, escapes to al-Andalus in the aftermath of the Abbasid revolution.
756	March	Abd al-Rahman I defeats Yusuf ibn Abd al-Rahman al-Fihri in the Battle of Alameda.
756	14 May	Abd al-Rahman I proclaims the Emirate of Córdoba with himself as the Emir.
757		After the death of Alfonso I of Asturias, Fruela I of Asturias, his older son, ascends to the throne. He would suppress uprisings in Galicia, laying waste to the Galician country.
762		The Abbasid, who now control Damascus, appoint Al-Ala ibn Mughith al-Judhami as governor of al-Andalus. He would set his government in Beja, but would be unsuccessful in gaining control of al-Andalus, being killed in battle by the forces of Abd al-Rahman I.
768	14 January	Fruela I is assassinated by his own men, as a result of their discontentment over the fact he killed his own brother Vimarano, and is succeeded by his cousin, Aurelius of Asturias.
774		Aurelius dies of natural causes and is succeeded by his cousin-in-law, Silo of Asturias, the husband of Alfonso I's daughter Adosinda. Silo would stamp down a second rebel revolt in Galicia.
777		The Abbasid appoint a second governor, Abd al-Rahman ibn Habib al-Siqlabi, to dispute control of al-Andalus against Abd al-Rahman I. Ibn Ḥabīb was also unsuccessful and was the last al-Andalus governor appointed by Damascus.
783		Silo dies and is succeeded by Alfonso II of Asturias, although immediately deposed by the nobility in favor of his uncle Mauregatus.
788	6 October	Hisham I becomes Emir of Córdoba.
789		Mauregatus dies and is succeeded by Bermudo I of Asturias, nephew of Alfonso I.
791		Bermudo I is defeated at the Battle of the Burbia River and abdicates.
791	14 September	Alfonso II is proclaimed King a second time.
796	12 June	Al-Hakam I becomes Emir of Córdoba.
798		Alfonso II sacks Lisbon.

== 9th century ==
Year	Date	Event
822	21 May	Abd ar-Rahman II becomes Emir of Córdoba. He would engage in nearly continuous warfare against Alfonso II of Asturias.
839/840		Abd ar-Rahman II sent an embassy under al-Ghazal to Constantinople to sign a pact with the Byzantine Empire against the Abbasids.
842		Alfonso II dies and is succeeded by Ramiro I of Asturias. Because Ramiro I was not in the capital, Nepotian of Asturias, with the support of some members the nobility, usurped the throne but quickly lost militarily against Ramiro I's allies upon his return.
844	August or September	First Viking raid of Lisbon, who occupied the city for 13 days. The governor of Lisbon, Wahballah ibn Hazm, wrote about the attack to the Emir.
848		William of Septimania requests Abd ar-Rahman II in his struggle against Charles the Bald.
850	1 February	Ramiro I dies and is succeeded by his son Ordoño I of Asturias, becoming the first king of Asturias to ascend the throne without election by nobility (in contrast to the Visigothic tradition).
850		While during most Islamic rule Christians were considered part of the Dhimmi, and thus allowed to exist and worship in private, the Emirs of Córdoba would execute 48 Christians between 850 and 859, known collectively as the Martyrs of Córdoba. The Martyrs included at least two Mozarabs born in present-day Portugal: Sisenandus of Beja (patron saint of Beja) and a priest named Elias, also from Beja, executed with two of his students.
852		Muhammad I becomes Emir of Córdoba.
868		Ibn Marwan al-Jilliqi, a Muwallad of (what is now) Northern Portugal descent, led a group of Muwallad and Mozarabic rebels against Muhammad I. He was granted Badajoz from the Emir but maintained resistance against the Emir's rule until his death in 889.
868		Vímara Peres was made count of Portugal by Alfonso III of Asturias, king of Asturias, after conquering from the Emirate of Córdoba the Atlantic coast between the Minho and Douro rivers.
873		Vímara died. He was succeeded as count of Portugal by his son Lucídio Vimaranes.
876		The Berber Banu Dānis, who had settled many places in modern-day Portugal, lose Coimbra to Alfonso III of Asturias.
878		Hermenegildo Gutiérrez, who took part in the Reconquista defeating Muslim troops in Porto and Coimbra, becomes count of Coimbra.
886		Al-Mundhir becomes Emir of Córdoba.
888		Abdullah becomes Emir of Córdoba. He would face rebellions from the Banu Dānis, who considered him to have usurped the throne from his half-brother Al-Mundhir.
895		Hermenegildo defeats the Galician noble Witiza who had taken up arms against the king of Asturia.

== 10th century ==
Year	Date	Event
909		Alfonso III of Asturias is deposed by his sons yet also proclaimed Emperor.
910		Alfonso III of Asturias dies and his kingdom is divided among his sons into the dependent kingdoms of Astúrias, León and Galicia.
910		Ordoño II becomes King of Galicia with the support of the Count of Portugal.
911		Count Hermenegildo Guterres of Coimbra, dies and his son Arias Mendes becomes Count of Coimbra.
912		Abd al-Rahman III becomes the Umayyad Emir of Córdoba.
913		An expedition commanded by Ordoño II, then vassal king of Galicia, into Muslim territory takes Évora from the Muslims.
914		Ordoño II of Galicia, becomes King of León, after the death of his brother García I of León.
914		The capital city of the Kingdom of Asturias is moved from Oviedo to León, from now on Kingdom of León.
916		Ordoño II of León is defeated by the Emir Abd al-Rahman III in Valdejunquera.
918		Battle of Talavera where Muslims under Abd al-Rahman III defeat the Christians.
918		Pope John X recognises the orthodoxy and legitimacy of the Visigothic Liturgy maintained in the Mozarabic rite.
924		Fruela II becomes King of León.
925		Sancho Ordonhes, son of Ordoño II of León, becomes vassal king of Galicia until 929.
925		Alfonso IV becomes King of León.
925		Ramiro II, son of Ordoño II of León, was the first to bear the title King of Portuguese Land.
926		Ramiro II takes residency in the city of Viseu.
926		Mendo I Gonçalves, (son of Count Gonzalo Betotez of Galicia) marries Mumadona Dias (daughter of count Diogo Fernandes and Onega) and becomes Count of Portugal.
926		The Umayyad Emir Abd al-Rahman III, faced with the threat of invasion by the Fatimids, proclaims himself Caliph of Córdoba. Under the reign of Abd al-Rahman III Muslim Al-Andalus reaches its greatest height before its slow decline over the next four centuries.
928		Gonçalo Moniz, grandson of Count Arias Mendes of Coimbra, becomes Count of Coimbra.
929		Abd al-Rahman III proclaims himself Caliph in Córdoba and transforms the Emirate of Córdoba into an independent caliphate no longer under even theoretical control from Baghdad.
930		Ramiro II leaves his residency in Viseu.
931		Ramiro II becomes King of León.
938		First document where the word Portugal is written in its present form.
946		The county of Castile becomes independent.
950		Countess Mumadona Dias of Portugal divides amongst her sons her the vast domains, upon the death of her husband Count Mendo I Gonçalves.
950		Gonçalo I Mendes, son of Mumadona Dias and Mendo I Gonçalves, becomes Count of Portugal.
950		Ordoño III becomes King of León.
951		Abd al-Rahman III signs a peace treaty with Ordoño III in order to focus on dealing with the Fatimid Caliphate.
953		Big [[Moorish|Moorish]] incursion in Galicia.
955		Ordoño III of León attacks Lisbon.
956		Sancho I becomes King of León.
958		Sancho I of León is deposed and Ordoño IV becomes King of León. Sancho I asks his grandmother, Toda of Pamplona, to aid him in recovering the throne.
959		Countess Mumadona Dias donates vast estates to the Monastery of St. Mamede in Guimarães.
959		Sancho I, accompanied by Toda of Pamplona, seeks an alliance with Abd al-Rahman III in order to overthrow Ordoño IV.
960		Sancho I of León is reinstated as King of León, after the Pamplonian-Muslim army captures Léon. Ordoño IV fled to the Asturias.
961		Al-Hakam II becomes Umayyad Caliph of Córdoba.
962		Count Gonçalo I Mendes of Portugal rebels against Sancho I of León.
966		Count Gonçalo Moniz of Coimbra rebels against Sancho I of León.
966		Vikings raid Galicia and kill the bishop of Santiago de Compostela in battle, but his successor St. Rudesind rallies the local forces and kills the Viking King Gundered.
967		Ramiro III becomes King of León.
968		Countess Mumadona Dias dies.
971		Another minor Viking raid in Galicia.
976		Caliph Al-Hakam II dies, and Al-Mansur Ibn Abi Aamir (nicknamed al-Manṣūr) takes over in the name of his protégé Hisham II, becoming a military dictator usurping caliphal powers and launching a big number of offensive campaigns against the Christians.
981		Count Gonçalo Moniz of Coimbra dies.
982		Bermudo II becomes King of León, having been acclaimed by the Counts of Galicia and anointed in Santiago de Compostela.
987		Al-Mansur Ibn Abi Aamir lays waste to Coimbra.
987		Al-Mansur Ibn Abi Aamir seizes the castles north of the Douro River, and arrives at the city of Santiago de Compostela. The city had been evacuated and Al-Mansur burns it to the ground and destroys the Church of Santiago.
987		Count Gonçalo I Mendes takes the personal title Magnus Dux Portucalensium (Grand-Duke of Portucale) and rebels against King Bermudo II of León, being defeated.
999		Alfonso V becomes King of León.
999		Mendo II Gonçalves, son (or grandson?) of Gonçalo I Mendes and Tuta, becomes Count of Portugal.

== 11th century ==
Year	Date	Event
1002		Al-Mansur Ibn Abi Aamir dies in the village of Salem due to natural causes. His son, Abd al-Malik al-Muzaffar, takes his place in being the de facto ruler of al-Andalus (officially Hajib).
1003		Moors lay waste to the city of León.
1008		Vikings raid Galicia, killing Count Mendo II Gonçalves of Portucal.
1008		Alvito Nunes, of a collateral line but also descent of Vímara Peres, married to Countess Tudadomna, becomes Count of Portucal.
1008		Abd al-Malik al Muzaffar dies of natural causes and is replaced by his brother, Abd al-Rahman Sanchuelo.
1009	February	The Fitna of al-Andalus begins with the assassination of Abd al-Rahman Sanchuelo, the deposition of Hisham II, and rise to power of Muhammad II of Córdoba, who led the coup. This would open a period of great chaos in the al-Andalus, with significant fragmentation and in-fighting between Muslim forces.
1009		Sulaiman al-Mustain, leading the Berber forces in Córdoba, successful deposes Mohammed II and becomes Caliph of Córdoba.
1009		The Taifa (independent Moorish kingdom) of Badajoz becomes independent of the Caliph of Córdoba and governs the territory between Coimbra and North Alentejo.
1010		Hisham II is restored as Umayyad Caliph of Córdoba by slave troops of the Caliphate under al-Wahdid.
1012		Sulaiman al-Mustain is restored as Umayyad Caliph of Córdoba by the Berber armies.
1013		Caliphate of Córdoba begins to break up. Berber troops take Córdoba with much plundering and destruction and kill the deposed Hisham II. Many Taifas (independent Moorish kingdoms) begin to spring up.
1016		Norman invaders ascend the Minho river and destroy Tuy in Galicia.
1017		Nuno I Alvites, son of Alvito Nunes and Tudadomna, becomes Count of Portugal. He marries Ilduara Mendes, daughter of Mendo II Gonçalves and Tuta.
1018		The Taifa of the Algarve becomes independent.
1021		Abd-ar-Rahman IV becomes Umayyad Caliph of Córdoba.
1022		Abd-ar-Rahman V becomes Umayyad Caliph of Córdoba.
1022		The Taifa (independent Moorish kingdom) of Lisbon emerges.
1023		Muhammad III becomes Umayyad Caliph of Córdoba.
1025		Abu al-Qasim Muhammad ibn Abbad, Abbadid Emir of Seville, captures two castles at Alafões to the north-west of Viseu.
1027		Hisham III becomes Umayyad Caliph of Córdoba.
1028		Mendo III Nunes, son of Nuno I Alvites and Ilduara Mendes, becomes Count of Portugal.
1028	7 August	Alfonso V, king of Asturias and León, lays siege to the Muslim town of Viseu but is killed by a bolt from the walls.
1028		Bermudo III, becomes King of León.
1031		Sancho III of Navarre declares war on Bermudo III of León. Navarre, sometimes assisted by Galician rebels and Normans, ravages the lands around Lugo in Galicia.
1031		The Cordoban elite abolishes the caliphate and established an independent state, the Taifa of Córdoba. This would bring an end to the Fitna of al-Andalus.
1033		The Taifa (independent Moorish kingdom) of Mértola becomes independent.
1034		The Leonese destroy a raiding force under Ismail ibn Abbad of Seville. Ismail ibn Abbad flees to Lisbon.
1034		Gonçalo Trastemires – a Portuguese frontiersman – captures Montemor castle on the Mondego river.
1034		Sancho the Great of Navarre had incorporated Aragon, Sobrarbe, Barcelona, as well as Asturias, León and Castile, and he proclaims himself Rex Hispaniarum ("King of all Spains").
1034		The Taifa of Lisbon ceases to exist, being annexed by the Taifa of Badajoz.
1035		Sancho III of Navarre, Aragon and Castile dies and distributes his lands among his three sons; Castile and Aragon become kingdoms.
1035		Bermudo III of León defeats the Moors in César, in the Aveiro region.
1037		Ferdinand of Castile, son of Sancho III of Navarre, acquires the Kingdom of León in the Battle of Tamarón. The first Castilian king, Ferdinand I, defeats and kills his father-in-law, Bermudo III of León, thus inheriting his kingdom. With Bermudo III's death, the Astur-Leonese dynasty ends and is replaced by the Jiménez dynasty.
1039		Ferdinand I of Castille-León proclaims himself Emperor of all Hispania.
1040		The Taifa of Silves becomes independent.
1044		Abbad III al-Mu'tamid, son of the Abbadid Emir of Seville Abbad II al-Mu'tadid, retakes Mértola, since 1033 an independent Taifa.
1050		Count Mendo III Nunes of Portugal is killed in battle sometime during this period.
1050		Nuno II Mendes, son of Count Mendo III Nunes, becomes Count of Portugal.
1051		The Taifa of the Algarve is annexed by the Taifa of Seville. Abu al-Qasim ibn Qasi, governor of Silves and who had aided Afonso I of Portugal against the Almohads, is beheaded.
1056		The Almoravides (al-Murabitun) Dynasty begins its rise to power. Taking the name "those who line up in defence of the faith", this is a group of fundamentalist Berber Muslims who would rule North Africa and Islamic Iberia until 1147.
1057		Ferdinand I of Castille-León conquers Lamego to the Moors.
1058		Emir Al-Muzaffar al-Aftas (Abu Bekr Muhammad al-Mudaffar – Modafar I of Badajoz, Aftid dynasty) pays the Christians to leave Badajoz, but not before Viseu being conquered by Ferdinand I of Castile-León.
1060		Council (Ecumenical Synod) of Santiago de Compostela. (to 1063)
1063		Ferdinand I of Castile-León divides his kingdom among his sons. Galicia is allotted to his son Garcia.
1063		The Taifa of Silves is annexed by the Taifa of Seville.
1064		Ferdinand I of León-Castile besieges Muslim Coimbra from 20 January until 9 July . The Muslim governor who surrendered is allowed to leave with his family, but 5,000 inhabitants are taken captive, and all Muslims are forced out of Portuguese territory across the Mondego river.
1064		The Mozarabic (Christian) general Sisnando Davides, who led the siege of Coimbra, becomes Count of Coimbra.
1064		The Hispanic calendar is adopted.
1065		Independence of the Kingdom of Galicia and Portugal is proclaimed under the rule of Garcia II of Galicia.
1070		Count Nuno II Mendes of Portugal rises against King Garcia II of Galicia.
1071		Garcia II of Galicia became the first to use the title King of Portugal, when he defeated, in the Battle of Pedroso (near Braga), Count Nuno II Mendes, last count of Portugal of the Vímara Peres House.
1072		Loss of independence of the Kingdom of Galicia and Portugal, forcibly reannexed by Garcia's brother king Alfonso VI of Castile. From that time on Galicia remained part of the Kingdoms of Castile and León, although under differing degrees of self-government. Even if it did not last for very long, the Kingdom set the stage for future Portuguese independence under Henry, Count of Portugal.
1077		Alfonso VI of Castile and León proclaims himself Emperor of all Spains.
1080		Coimbra is again a diocese.
1080		Count Sisnando Davides of Coimbra takes part in the invasion of Granada.
1085		The Order of Cluny is established in Portugal. (to 1096)
1086		Several Muslim Emirs (namely Abbad III al-Mu'tamid) ask the Almoravids leader Yusuf ibn Tashfin for help against Alfonso VI of Castile. In this year Yusuf ibn Tashfin passed the straits to Algeciras and inflicted a severe defeat on the Christians at the Battle of az-Zallaqah (North of Badajoz). He was debarred from following up his victory by trouble in North Africa which he had to settle in person.
1086		Raymond of Burgundy, son of William I, Count of Burgundy, comes to Iberia for the 1st time to fight against the Moors, bringing with him his younger cousin Henry of Burgundy, grandson of Robert I, Duke of Burgundy.
1090		Almoravid Yusuf ibn Tashfin return to Iberia and conquers all the Taifas.
1090		Raymond of Burgundy and Henry of Burgundy come to Iberia for the 2nd time.
1091		Count Sisnando Davides of Coimbra dies.
1091		Alfonso VI of Castile gives her daughter Urraca of Castile in marriage to Raymond of Burgundy together with the fiefdom of Galicia.
1091		The Taifa of Mértola falls to the Almoravids.
1093		Raymond of Burgundy and Henry of Burgundy sign a treaty whereby Henry promises to recognise Raymond as king upon the death of Alfonso VI of Castile, receiving in exchange the Kingdom of Toledo or of Portugal.
1094		Alfonso VI of Castile grants Raymond of Burgundy the government of Portugal and Coimbra.
1094		Henry of Burgundy marries Alfonso VI of Castile's illegitimate daughter Teresa of León.
1094		Almoravid Sir ibn Abi Bakr takes Badajoz and Lisbon. Fall of the Taifa of Badajoz.
1095		Establishment of the 2nd County of Portugal (Condado Portucalense), by Count Henry of Burgundy.
1095		The Almoravids take Santarém.
1097		Yusuf ibn Tashfin assumes the title of Amir al Muslimin (Prince of the Muslims).

== 12th century ==
Year	Date	Event
1102		Diego Gemírez, Bishop of Santiago de Compostela, uses force to carry off the relics of St. Victor and St. Fructuosus of Dumes from Braga – recently reinstated as a Metropolitan See.
1103		In the absence of Henry, Count of Portugal in Rome or Jerusalem, Theresa, Countess of Portugal, aided by Soeiro Mendes, governs Portugal.
1105		The Almohads, founded by Ibn Tumart, began as a religious movement to rid Islam of impurities. Most specifically, the Almohades were opposed to anthropomorphisms which had slipped into Iberian Islam. Ibn Tumart's successor, Abd al-Mu'min, turned the movement against non-Muslims, specifically Jews and Christians. Sweeping across North Africa and into Muslim Iberia, the Almohads initiate riots and persecutions of both Muslims and non-Muslims. In some towns Jews and Christians are given the choice of conversion, exile, or death.
1107		Count Raymond of Burgundy dies. The Kingdom of Galicia passes on to his son Alfonso Raimúndez.
1109	1 July	Alfonso VI of Castile and León dies. Urraca of Castile, Count Raymond of Burgundy's widow, is his only surviving legitimate child and marries King Alfonso I of Aragon.
1109	25 July	Afonso Henriques, son of Henry, Count of Portugal, is born in the city of Guimarães.
1110		Henry, Count of Portugal unsuccessfully besieges King Alfonso I of Aragon in Penafiel.
1110		Urraca of Castile distances herself from her husband Alfonso I of Aragon accusing him of being abusive and infertile.
1110		Henry, Count of Portugal makes common party with Alfonso I of Aragon against Urraca of Castile.
1111		Almoravids led by Sir ibn Abi Bakr occupy Lisbon and Santarém in the west. These cities were occupied by the Almoravids in 1094–95 this suggests a fluctuating border in Portugal.
1111		Conference of Palencia, where Urraca of Castile divides her estates with Henry, Count of Portugal and his wife and her sister Theresa.
1111		Urraca of Castile makes peace with her husband Alfonso I of Aragon, even though they remain separated.
1111		Henry, Count of Portugal, believing Urraca of Castile has betrayed him, besieges her and her husband Alfonso I of Aragon in Sahagún, aided by Urraca's son Alfonso Raimúndez.
1111		Henry, Count of Portugal grants city rights and privileges to Coimbra and captures Santarém from the Moors.
1111		Alfonso Raimúndez, Raymond of Burgundy and Urraca of Castile's son, is proclaimed King of Castile and León as Alfonso VII. This is not recognised.
1112		Henry, Count of Portugal dies. His son Afonso Henriques inherits the County of Portugal, but, being too young, it is his mother, Theresa, Countess of Portugal, that governs the county after her husband's death with the title of Regina (Queen). Santarém recaptured by the Moors.
1114		The marriage between Urraca of Castile and Alfonso I of Aragon is annulled.
1114		The Taifa of Beja and Évora becomes independent.
1116		The armies of Theresa, Countess of Portugal battle against the armies of Urraca of Castile.
1117		Almoravids under Emir Ali ibn Yusuf himself take Coimbra, but abandon the city after a few days.
1120		Afonso Henriques takes sides with the Bishop of Braga against his mother Theresa, Countess of Portugal and her lover, the Count Fernando Peres de Trava of Galicia
1120		The armies of Theresa, Countess of Portugal battle against the armies of Urraca of Castile.
1121		Alfonso Raimúndez comes into Portugal in a mission of sovereignty with his mother Urraca of Castile. Their armies capture Theresa, Countess of Portugal at Lanhoso, that accepts to go free and hold the County of Portugal as a fief of the Kingdom of León.
1122		Afonso Henriques, aged 14, makes himself a Knight on his own account in the Cathedral of Zamora.
1126		Urraca of Castile dies. Her son Alfonso Raimúndez finally becomes King Alfonso VII of Castile and León.
1127		Theresa, Countess of Portugal donates Vimieiro to the Order of Cluny
1127		The Kingdom of León invades Portugal and besieges Guimarães. The Portuguese Knight Egas Moniz de Ribadouro manages to make King Alfonso VII of Castile and León accept promises' of Portuguese fealty.
1128		Theresa, Countess of Portugal donates Soure to the Knights Templar.
1128	24 July	Count Afonso Henriques defeats his mother, Theresa, Countess of Portugal, in the Battle of São Mamede (near Guimarães) and becomes sole ruler (Dux – Duke) after demands for independence from the county's people, church and nobles.
1129	6 April	Afonso Henriques proclaims himself Prince of Portugal.
1130		Prince Afonso Henriques invades Galicia.
1130		Prince Afonso Henriques' mother, Theresa, Countess of Portugal, dies in Galicia.
1130		The Knights Hospitaller install themselves in Portugal.
1135		Prince Afonso Henriques conquers Leiria from the Moors.
1135		King Alfonso VII of Castile and León is proclaimed Imperator totius Hispaniae.
1137		Battle of Arcos de Valdevez
1137		Peace treaty of Tui, whereby Prince Afonso Henriques acknowledges himself as vassal to King Alfonso VII of Castile and León, through the possession of Astorga.
1137		Prince Afonso I of Portugal tries and fails to conquer Lisbon from the Moors.
1137		The Moors retake Leiria.
1139		King Afonso I of Portugal assembles the first assembly of the estates-general of Portugal at Lamego, where he was given the Crown from the Bishop of Braga, to confirm the independence.
1139		King Afonso I of Portugal retakes Leiria from the Moors.
1139	25 July	Independence of Portugal from the Kingdom of León declared after the Battle of Ourique against the Almoravids led by Ali ibn Yusuf: Prince Afonso Henriques becomes Afonso I, King of Portugal.
1140		The Knights Hospitaller receive lands and privileges from King Afonso I of Portugal.
1140		Portuguese victory in the Battle of Valdevez against Leonese and Castilian forces.
1140		King Afonso I of Portugal tries and fails to conquer Lisbon from the Moors.
1140		The Moors retake Leiria.
1142		King Afonso I of Portugal retakes Leiria from the Moors and the town receives its foral (compilation of feudal rights) to stimulate the colonisation of the area.
1143		Treaty of Zamora: Alfonso VII of León and Castille recognises the Kingdom of Portugal in the presence of King Afonso I of Portugal, witnessed by the papal representative, the Cardinal Guido de Vico, at the Cathedral of Zamora. Both kings promise durable peace between their kingdoms.
1143		King Afonso I of Portugal declares himself vassal to Pope Innocent II, placing the Kingdom of Portugal and himself under the protection of Saint Peter and the Holy See.
1144		The Muridun ("Disciples") under Abul-Qasim Ahmad ibn al-Husayn al-Qasi rebel in the Algarve. Ibn al-Mundhir takes Silves in his name and the governor of Beja, Sidray ibn Wazir, also supports him. Ibn al-Mundhir and Sidray ibn Wazir kill the garrison of Monchique castle, and 70 men take Mértola by surprise (12 Aug). Soon after the Andalusian governor of Niebla, Yusuf ibn Ahmad al-Bitruji declares for the Muridun. The Almoravid Yahya ibn Ali ibn Ghaniya drives the Muridun back from Seville, and subsequently Sidray ibn Wazir splits off from the other Muridun.
1144		The Taifa of Mértola and of Silves again become independent.
1144		The Order of Cistercians installs itself in Portugal, at Tarouca.
1145		The Taifa of Badajoz again becomes independent and conquers the Taifa of Mértola.
1146		The Taifa of Mértola gains independence from Badajoz.
1146		King Afonso I of Portugal marries Mafalda of Savoy, daughter of Amadeus III, Count of Savoy and Maurienne.
1147		The towns of Almada and Palmela, just south of Lisbon, are taken from the Moors.
1147		King Afonso I of Portugal orders the construction of the church and monastery of Church of São Vicente de Fora (St. Vincent outside the Walls), in Lisbon, in honour of St. Vincent the Deacon.
1147	15 March	King Afonso I of Portugal takes Santarém in a surprise attack.
1147	19 May	A fleet of almost 200 ships of crusaders (Second Crusade) leaves from Dartmouth in England, consisting of Flemish, Frisian, Norman, English, Scottish, and some German crusaders. The fleet was commanded by Arnold III of Aerschot (nephew of Godfrey of Louvain) Christian of Ghistelles, Henry Glanville (constable of Suffolk), Simon of Dover, Andrew of London, and Saher of Archelle.
1147	16 June	The crusaders fleet arrives at the northern city of Porto, and are convinced by the bishop, Pedro II Pitões, to continue to Lisbon.
1147	1 July	The Siege of Lisbon begins, after the armies of King Afonso I of Portugal were joined by the crusaders.
1147	21 October	The Moorish rulers of Lisbon agree to surrender to King Afonso I of Portugal, basically due to the hunger that was felt inside the city walls. The terms of surrender indicated that the Muslim garrison of the city would be allowed to flee.
1147	25 October	The city of Lisbon opens its doors to the Christian armies. As soon as the Christians enter the city the terms of surrender were broken. Many Muslims were killed, and the city was thoroughly plundered before King Afonso I of Portugal finally was able to stop the onslaught.
1148		Some of the crusaders that had helped King Afonso I of Portugal conquer Lisbon settle in the newly captured city, and Gilbert of Hastings is elected bishop of the renovated Diocese of Lisbon, but most of the crusaders' fleet continues to the east.
1149		A new Berber dynasty, the Almohad, led by Emir Abd al-Mu'min al-Kumi conquers North Africa to the Almoravids and soon invades the Iberian Peninsula.
1150		The Taifas of Badajoz and of Beja and Évora are taken by the Almohads.
1151		King Afonso I of Portugal tries and fails to take Alcácer do Sal from the Moors.
1151		The Taifa of Mértola is taken by the Almohads.
1152		The Cistercians build the Monastery of St. John in Tarouca.
1153		The Cistercians build the Monastery of Alcobaça.
1154		Sancho, son of King Afonso I of Portugal and future King of Portugal is born.
1155		The Taifa of Silves is taken by the Almohads.
1158		King Afonso I of Portugal conquers Alcácer do Sal from the Moors.
1159		The Castle of Cera (in Tomar) is donated to the Knights Templar.
1159		Évora and Beja, in the southern province of Alentejo, are taken from the Moors.
1160		The city of Tomar is founded by Gualdim Pais.
1161		Évora, Beja and Alcácer do Sal are retaken by the Moors.
1162		King Afonso I of Portugal retakes Beja from the Moors.
1163		The Almohad Caliph Abd al-Mu'min al-Kumi dies and is succeeded by Abu Ya'qub Yusuf I.
1165		The Portuguese armies, led by Gerald the Fearless, retake Évora from the Moors.
1165		Negotiations between Portugal and León result in the marriage of Princess Urraca of Portugal, King Afonso I's daughter, with King Ferdinand II of León.
1166		The Portuguese armies take Serpa and Moura (in Alentejo) from the Moors.
1168		Portuguese frontiersman Gerald the Fearless goes into the territory of Badajoz.
1169		King Afonso I of Portugal grants the Knights Templar one third of all they conquer to the Moors in Alentejo.
1169		Gerald the Fearless seizes Badajoz from the Almohads.
1169		King Afonso I of Portugal is wounded by a fall from his horse in Badajoz, and is captured by the competing forces of King Ferdinand II of León. As ransom King Afonso I was obliged to surrender almost all the conquests he had made in Galicia in the previous years as well as Badajoz, that the Leonese gave back to the Almohads as a vassal territory.
1170		The Almohads transfer their capital to Seville.
1174		The Crown of Aragon recognises Portugal as independent.
1175		Beja recaptured by Almohads.
1179		Pope Alexander III, in the Papal bull Manifestis Probatum, recognises Afonso I as King and Portugal as an independent country with the right to conquer lands from the Moors. With this papal blessing, Portugal was at last secured as a country and safe from any Leonese or Castilian attempts of annexation.
1179		King Ferdinand II of León repudiates his wife, Urraca of Portugal, King Afonso I's daughter.
1184		The Portuguese defeat the Almohads at Santarém.
1184		Yusuf I, Almohad Caliph, dies and is succeeded by Abu Yusuf Ya'qub al-Mansur.
1185		Sancho I of Portugal becomes King of Portugal.
1185		Sancho I of Portugal founds several new towns and villages and takes great care in populating remote areas in the northern Christian regions of Portugal, notably with Flemings and Burgundians. (to 1212)
1185	6 December	King Afonso I of Portugal dies.
1199		The Almohad Caliph Abu Yusuf Ya'qub al-Mansur dies and is succeeded by Muhammad an-Nasir.

== 13th century ==
Year	Date	Event
1211		Afonso II of Portugal becomes king.
1212		Culmination of the Reconquista. Christians, amongst them the troops of King Afonso II of Portugal, defeat Almohads (Caliph Muhammad an-Nasir) at the Battle of Las Navas de Tolosa. The Christians had 60–100,000 infantry and 10,000 cavalry, and had troops from Western Europe, Castile, Navarre, Aragon, León and Portugal, Military Orders (Knights Templar, Knights Hospitaller, Santiago, Cavatrava), and urban Militias.
1213		Abu Ya'qub Yusuf II becomes Almohad Caliph.
1214	27 June	The Will of Afonso II of Portugal is written, one of the oldest known documents written in Galician–Portuguese.
1217		Siege of Alcácer do Sal. City captured by the Portuguese.
1223		Sancho II of Portugal becomes king.
1236		Portugal captures most of the Algarve.
1246		Pope Innocent IV declares Sancho II an heretic and orders his removal of the throne.
1247		Afonso III of Portugal becomes king; Sancho II is exiled to Toledo.
1254		First official reunion of the Cortes, the kingdom's general assembly.
1255		The city of Lisbon becomes the capital-city of Portugal.
1272		Afonso III conquers Faro from the Moors, thus removing all Muslim communities from Portuguese soil and ending the Portuguese Reconquista.
1276		John XXI becomes the first and only Portuguese Pope (died 1277).
1279		Dinis of Portugal becomes king.
1290	1 March	Creation of the Estudo Geral (General Study) in Coimbra, the first Portuguese University, with the Faculties of Arts, Canons, Laws and Medicine, and later confirmed by Pope Nicholas IV.
1297		Dinis signs the Treaty of Alcanizes with Ferdinand IV of Castile to define the borders between Portugal and Castile.

== 14th century ==
Year	Date	Event
1308		First Portuguese commercial treaty, signed with England.
1308		The General Study is transferred to Coimbra.
1319–1324		Civil War between D. Dinis and D. Afonso IV (Sotto Mayor Pizarro 1997, p. 190, Vol. I)
1325		Afonso IV of Portugal becomes king.
1341		Portugal raids the Canary Islands.
1355		Inês de Castro is killed by royal order; begins civil war between Afonso IV and his heir Pedro.
1357		Pedro I of Portugal becomes king; Inês de Castro is removed from her grave and crowned Queen of Portugal.
1367		Fernando I of Portugal becomes king.
1372	10 July	Portugal signs the Treaty of Tagilde with the United Kingdom.
1373	16 June	Portugal signs the Anglo-Portuguese Treaty with England.
1383		Civil war and political anarchy: 1383-1385 Crisis. (to 1385)
1385	April	João I of Portugal acclaimed king by the Portuguese; Castilians do not accept this claim.
1385	14 August	Battle of Aljubarrota: João I defeats the Castilians and secures the throne.
1386	9 May	Treaty of Windsor, an alliance between England and Portugal, the oldest Portuguese diplomatic agreement and the oldest diplomatic alliance in the world still in force. As a result, in 1387, Joao I marries, Phillipa, daughter of John of Gaunt, third son of King Edward III of England
1394		Henry the Navigator, son of king João I of Portugal, is born.

== 15th century ==
Year	Date	Event
1415		João I conquers the city of Ceuta in northern Africa.
1419		Madeira Islands discovered by João Gonçalves Zarco and Tristão Vaz Teixeira.
1427		Azores Islands discovered by Diogo Silves.
1433		Duarte of Portugal becomes king.
1434		Gil Eanes crosses the Bojador Cape: exploration of the African coast begins.
1438		Afonso V of Portugal becomes king.
1446 or 1447		Afonso V enacts the Alfonsine Ordinances, the first code of law of the Kingdom of Portugal. It established a legal hierarchy between Portuguese royal laws, Roman law and Canon law.
1456		Discovery of Cape Verde islands. (Settled 1462.)
1470		Discovery of São Tomé island.
1471		Discovery of Príncipe island.
1481		João II of Portugal becomes king.
1483		João II executes Fernando, the third Duke of Braganza, and Diogo, the Duke of Viseu, putting an end to high nobility conspiracies.
1484		Diogo Cão discovers the Congo River.
1491		Bartolomeu Dias becomes the first European to cross the Cape of Good Hope.
1494		The Treaty of Tordesillas signed between Spain and Portugal, dividing the colonisable world in two halves.
1495		Manuel I of Portugal becomes king.
1498		Vasco da Gama reaches India through navigation around Africa.
1500		Diogo Dias discovered an island they named after St Lawrence after the saint on whose feast day they had first sighted the island later known as Madagascar.
1500		Manuel I orders expulsion or conversion of the Portuguese Jews.
1500		Gaspar Corte-Real made his first voyage to Newfoundland, formerly known as Terras Corte-Real.
1500	22 April	Pedro Álvares Cabral discovers Brazil.

== 16th century ==
Year	Date	Event
1502	May	Miguel Corte-Real set out for New England in search of his brother, Gaspar.
1502		João da Nova discovered Ascension Island.
1502		Cortes in Lisbon.
1503	30 July	On his return from the East, Estêvão da Gama discovered Saint Helena Island.
	August 10	Fernão de Noronha discovered the island which still bears his name.
1505		Francisco de Almeida "the Great" appointed 1st Viceroy of India, arriving in Cochin in the same year at the head of the 7th Portuguese Indian Armada.
1506		Tristão da Cunha discovered the island that bears his name. Portuguese sailors landed on Madagascar.
1506	19 April	In the Lisbon Massacre, a crowd of churchgoers attack and kill people who they suspected to be Jews. The pogrom killed between 500 and 4,000 people. King Manuel I orders the participants of the pogrom to be summarily executed, executing around 500 rioters, and São Domingos Abbey was closed down for 8 years.
1509		The Gulf of Bengal crossed by Diogo Lopes de Sequeira. On the crossing he also reached Malacca.
1509		Francisco de Almeida becomes the first Portuguese to arrive in Bombay by sea, seeking to avenge the death of his son.
1509	3 February	At the naval Battle of Diu, Francisco de Almeida inflicts a decisive victory on the Mamlûk Burji Sultanate of Egypt, the Zamorin of Calicut, and the Sultan of Gujarat, marking the beginning of European dominance over Asian seas that would last until the Second World War.
1510	25 November	Conquest of Goa by Afonso de Albuquerque, Governor of India.
1511	15 August	Conquest of Malacca by Afonso de Albuquerque.
1512		António de Abreu reaches Timor island and the Banda Islands, Ambon Island and Seram. Francisco Serrão reaches the Maluku Islands.
1512		King Manuel issues the Manueline Ordinances, superseding the Alfonsine Ordinances of the XVth century.
1513		The first European trading ship to touch the coasts of China, under Jorge Álvares and Rafael Perestrello later in the same year.
1515	1 April	Afonso de Albuquerque captures the Kingdom of Hormuz.
1517		Fernão Pires de Andrade and Tomé Pires were chosen by Manuel I of Portugal to sail to China to formally open relations between the Portuguese Empire and the Ming Dynasty during the reign of the Zhengde Emperor.
1517	12 April	The Siege of Jeddah takes place, marking the beginning of a series of Ottoman–Portuguese confrontations.
1521	13 December	João III of Portugal becomes king.
1521		António Correia captures Bahrain, which is under Portuguese rule until 1602.
1525		Cortes in Torres Novas, requiring the King to assemble the Cortes at least once every 10 years.
1526		Jorge de Meneses reaches New Guinea for the first time.
1535		Cortes in Évora, declaring Prince Manuel, as the heir. Prince Manuel would die 2 years later, at age 5.
1536	27 January	Fernão de Oliveira publishes his Grammatica da lingoagem portuguesa, the first Grammar of the Portuguese language.
1537		After moving back and forth between Lisbon and Coimbra in the last two centuries, the General Study is definitely established in the latter.
1543		Portuguese explorers Fernão Mendes Pinto, Francisco Zeimoto and António Mota are the first Europeans to land in Japan.
1544		Cortes at Almeirim.
1557		Macau given to Portugal by the Emperor of China as a reward for services rendered against the pirates who infested the South China Sea.
1557	11 June	Sebastião of Portugal (aged 3) becomes king with Catherine of Austria, his grandmother, as regent.
1558	12 February	Catherine of Austria resigns from the role of regent, in favor of Cardinal Henrique.
1562		Cortes at Lisbon.
1563	4 December	Council of Trent, prompted by the Protestant Reformation, ends its last session. It was attended by the Portuguese Archbishop of Braga, Bartholomew of Braga.
1566		The last of the medieval Councils of Braga takes place, in which Bartholomew attempts to apply the reforms of the Council of Trent.
1568		King Sebastião of Portugal comes of age and takes control of government.
1569	April	The Big Plague, a bubonic plague epidemic in Portugal. In Lisbon, at the peak, around 700 people die per day.
1569		Ōmura Sumitada issues a permit opening Nagasaki to Portuguese traders.
1570	7 April	Luís de Camões returns to Lisbon from the Orient.
1570	28 December	Goa, in Portuguese India, is attacked by a coalition of Indian forces, but these are defeated by Portuguese Vice-Roy Luís de Ataíde, Count of Atouguia, in the Siege of Goa.
1572		The first edition of the epic poem The Lusiads is published.
1578	4 August	Portuguese troops utterly defeated in Africa, in the battle of Alcácer Quibir; king Sebastião disappears in the battle never to be seen again.
1578	4 August	Cardinal Henrique I of Portugal becomes king.
1579	1 April	Cortes in Lisbon assembled by Cardinal Henrique to resolve controversy on the succession to the late Sebastian.
1580	11 January	Cortes in Almeirim to ratify Henry's right to appoint Philip II of Spain as his successor.
1580	31 January	King Cardinal Henrique I of Portugal dies.
1580	10 June	Death of Luís de Camões, Portugal's national poet.
1580	24 July	Anthony of Portugal, the Prior of Crato, is acclaimed King of Portugal in Santarém.
1580	25 August	Battle of Alcântara between Portuguese and Spanish forces. Spain wins.
1580	27 August	The Fortress of St. Julian, in Lisbon, surrenders to the Spanish.
1580	25 October	Spanish forces capture Porto.
1581	25 March	Philip II of Spain is acclaimed in the Cortes of Tomar as King Philip I of Portugal in a personal union of the Crowns. Portugal loses de facto independence to Spain.
1581		Anthony of Portugal, the Prior of Crato, takes refuge in England.
1581		The Azores refuse to recognise Philip I of Portugal as King.
1582	26 July	The Spanish Fleet of Santa Cruz defeats the Portuguese-French Fleet of Strozzi in the Azores in the Battle of Vila Franca do Campo.
1582	October	Introduction of the Gregorian Calendar in Portugal, the 4th of October is followed by the 15th. The colonies will adopt the calendar later, as a result of delays in communication.
1583		Cortes in Lisbon, to ratify Philip, Prince of Asturias, as the heir to the throne.
1583		King Philip I of Portugal departs for Madrid and leaves the government of Portugal with Portuguese trustees.
1583	2 August	The Azores are submitted in the Conquest of the Azores naval battle.
1583		Francis Drake attacks the Portuguese colony of Brazil.
1589	26 May	Anthony of Portugal, the Prior of Crato, attacks Lisbon with aid of the English Armada, but with no success.
1589	August - September	In the Azores Voyage of 1589, England sacks the Azores in the context of the Anglo-Spanish War.
1595	26 August	Anthony of Portugal, the Prior of Crato, dies in Paris.
1595		King Philip I issues the Philippine Ordinances, replacing the Manueline Ordinances.
1598	13 September	King Philip dies and Philip III of Spain becomes Philip II of Portugal.

== 17th century ==
Year	Date	Event
1603	25 February	Three Dutch ships seize Santa Catarina, leading to a scandal that would start the Dutch–Portuguese War.
1621		Philip IV of Spain becomes Philip III of Portugal.
1622	22–24 June	In the context of the Dutch–Portuguese War, the two forces engage in the Battle of Macau. Portugal won.
1638		Battle of Goa takes place, in the context of the Dutch-Portuguese war. Portugal won.
1640	1 December	A small group of conspirators storms the Palace in Lisbon and deposes the Vicereine of Portugal, Margaret of Savoy. The Duke of Bragança, head of the senior family of the Portuguese nobility (and descended from a bastard of João I), accepts the throne as Dom João IV of Portugal, despite deep personal reluctance, by popular acclaim and at the urging of his wife. His entire reign will be dominated by the struggle to maintain independence from Spain. Francisco de Lucena, secretary to the governing council of Portugal for the past 36 years and thus the most experienced bureaucrat in the country, smoothly changes his loyalties and becomes chief minister of the restored monarchy.
1641		The Portuguese Inquisition attempts to derail the national restoration by giving its support to a counter-revolution mounted by a duke, a marquis, three earls and an archbishop. The plot fails, quelled by Francisco de Lucena, who has the ringleaders executed, but it initiates a 28-year-long war against Spain punctuated by frequent internal threats to the stability of the new regime. Meanwhile, the Dutch renew their attack on Angola and capture the most extensive Portuguese slaving grounds in Africa, including the Angolan port of Luanda. The Portuguese garrison flees upriver while trying to decide whether to declare continuing loyalty to the Habsburgs, accept Dutch rule or declare for João IV. They choose the House of Bragança and appeal to the Portuguese colony of Brazil for help in fending off African and Dutch attacks on their enclave. Salvador de Sá, leader of Rio de Janeiro, persuaded by the Jesuits in Brazil, also declares for King João and responds to the Angolan appeal.
1644		Elvas withstands a nine-day siege by Spanish troops.
1648		The Portuguese from Brazil under Salvador de Sá land in Angola, expel the Dutch and restore the African colony to Portugal.
1654		Anglo-Portuguese treaty between João IV and Oliver Cromwell signed at Westminster. João agrees to prevent the molestation of the traders of the English Protector; they are allowed to use their own bible and bury their dead according to Protestant rites on Catholic soil. The Portuguese in Brazil drive the Dutch out of the great plantation colonies of the north-east, re-establishing the territorial integrity of Portugal's South American empire.
1656		Death of João IV after a reign of 15 years. His Queen now reigns as Regent for their son, Afonso VI of Portugal. She seeks an accommodation with Spain. Portugal loses control of Colombo in Portuguese Ceylon when it is captured by the Dutch.
1659		The Treaty of the Pyrenees ends Spain's long war with France, and Spanish troops are freed once more to suppress the Portuguese 'rebellion'. The Spaniards besiege Monção and are driven off by the Countess of Castelo Melhor.
1660		On the restoration of Charles II in Britain, the Queen-Regent re-negotiates the treaty of 1654. Portugal is allowed to recruit soldiers and horses in England for the fight against Spain; and to seek out 4,000 fighting men in Scotland and Ireland and charter 24 English ships to carry them. The expeditionary force is to be issued with English weapons on arrival in Portugal and guaranteed religious freedom of worship.
1661		Catarina da Bragança, sister of Afonso VI, marries Charles II of Great Britain on 31 May. She brings to London a dowry of 2,000,000 gold pieces, the practice of drinking afternoon tea, and England is given colonial toe-holds in the Portuguese Empire at Tangier and Bombay, per the Marriage Treaty. Servicing the wedding debt burdens the Portuguese exchequer for the next half-century, and this marriage with a Protestant monarch is deeply unpopular with that section of the Portuguese nobility which favours alliance with France.
1662		In a palace coup d’etat in Lisbon a restive younger faction of the nobility, supported by the young Afonso VI, overthrows the Queen Regent and installs the 26-year-old Count of Castelo Melhor as 'dictator' to prosecute the war with Spain. The adolescent king is married to a French princess and the young dictator models his government on the royal absolutism of the Bourbon dynasty. Opposition to this pro-French absolutism (from the King's sister the Queen of England, and his younger brother Prince Pedro) is swept aside, and Castelo Melhor initiates the final, successful phase of the Portuguese war of restoration with the aid of the Franco-German Marshal Schomberg, who brilliantly commands an international mercenary army against the Spanish forces.
1665	17 June	Portugal is victorious at the decisive Battle of Montes Claros, in which António Luís de Menezes defeats the Spanish army under the Prince of Parma; Spain ceases to make war, but peace will not be signed for another three years.
1667		Castelo Melhor and his Francophile party are overthrown in a new palace revolution. Prince Pedro, leader of the Anglophile party, becomes Regent for Afonso VI, who is declared incapable of governing and removed to the Azores. The French alliance is rejected, though Pedro shores up his political position by marrying his brother's estranged Queen. Castelo Melhor flees into exile (ironically, to England).
1668		Peace treaty with Spain ends nearly 30 years of war. Portugal keeps all his possessions and territory with the exception of Ceuta in Morocco, which is ceded to Spain. Portugal remains economically weak, however, agriculturally undeveloped and dependent on British grain and trade goods generally, especially woven cloth. The Count of Ericeira, economic adviser to the Prince Regent, advocates the development of a native textile industry modelled on Flemish lines. 'Factories' are established at Covilhã with easy access to flocks of sheep and clean mountain water, but are highly unpopular with both town consumers and traditional weavers. Meanwhile, Portuguese attempts to develop a silk industry are fiercely resisted by the French, who wish to monopolise that market.
1683		Death of Afonso VI. Pedro II of Portugal becomes king.
1690		Suicide of Luís de Meneses, Count of Ericeira.
1692		Great drought disrupts Portuguese silk production.
1697		Discovery of gold in the interior of São Paulo province, Brazil.
1700		Brazil now producing 50,000 ounces of gold per year.

== 18th century ==
Year	Date	Event
1703		Sir John Methuen negotiates a Military Treaty with Portugal on 16 May, giving Britain an entry to Portugal at a time when the Bourbon dynastic alliance of France and Spain appears to threaten English access to the Continent. This is followed on 27 December by the commercial Methuen Treaty, signed to stimulate trade with Britain. This (which lasts until 1810) opens up new markets for Portuguese wine but helps to destroy the native textile industry by letting in British cloth at preferential rates. The fashion for Portuguese wine in Britain (which has banned the import of French wine due to the War of the Spanish Succession, which will last until 1714) makes the wine trade so profitable and competitive that over the next 40 years inferior wines, often adulterated and artificially coloured are passed off as the genuine article – giving 'port' a bad name.
1705		Brazil is now producing 600,000 ounces of gold per year. For the second time in its history, Portugal controls one of the greatest gold-producing sources in the world.
1706		João V of Portugal becomes king. He presides over a great flowering of Portuguese art and culture underpinned by the fabulous wealth provided by Brazilian gold. Social and economic reform are neglected for the next 40 years, and the pious King indulges in a penchant for fabulously expensive building. The Portuguese royal family is now the wealthiest in Europe and João V even considers moving his throne and court to Rio de Janeiro. The taxation of the Brazilian trade brings in an enormous personal revenue to the monarch and he is able to construct an absolutist regime similar to that of the French Kings, concentrating on pomp and ceremony at court. There is however no attention to the impoverished national agriculture, inadequate transport, neglected merchant navy and minimal industrial development of the country since corn and cloth can easily be exported, foreign ships can be hired and 'every problem in Portugal can be solved by the King's gift of a little basket of gold coins bearing his effigy'. Meanwhile, the Brazilian gold rush continues and civil war breaks out between the mining camps of Portuguese immigrants lately come to the north of the country and the Paulistas of southern Brazil who discovered the gold in the first place.
1716		As a result of Portugal's political importance and the extensive global jurisdiction of the Metropolitan Archdiocese of Lisbon, Pope Clement XI grants the titular Archbishop the title of Patriarchate of Lisbon and the privilege of wearing a Triple Tiara. Later, the Pope agrees to made the Patriarchate a cardinal at the first consistory following his appointment. Tomás de Almeida is appointed 1st Patriarch of Lisbon, becoming a cardinal in 1737.
1717		Beginning of construction of the great palace-monastery of Mafra, which João V vowed on the birth of his heir, and which he intends as a rival to the Escorial. The elegance of the suites and courtyards are matched by the costliness of the furnishings in more than 1,000 rooms. The scale of the buildings and formal gardens is stupendous in relation to the impoverished countryside around it. However the roped gangs of forced labourers and the military regiment which controls them provides local employment throughout a generation, particularly in the servicing of the 7,000 carts and wagons and feeding of draught animals.
1732		Disaster at Elvas: lightning strikes the gunpowder magazine in the castle. The explosion and fire kill 1500 people and destroy 823 houses.
1735		Completion of the palace-monastery at Mafra.
1742		João V orders the construction in Rome of the Capela de São João Baptista for installation in the Igreja de São Roque to honour his patron saint and to requite the Pope, whom he has persuaded to confer a patriarchate on Lisbon. For its size, this is reckoned the most expensive building ever constructed. Designed by the papal architect Vanvitelli, and using the most costly materials available including ivory, agate, porphyry and lapis lazuli, the chapel is erected in the Vatican in order that the Pope may celebrate Mass in it before it is dismantled and shipped to Portugal.
1750		Death of João V. His son José I of Portugal becomes king. His powerful chief minister, Sebastião de Melo, Marquis of Pombal, embarks on a programme of reform to drag Portugal into the 18th century.
1752		Building of the Rococo palace of Queluz.
1755		The Great earthquake of Portugal is the most shattering natural phenomenon of the Age of Enlightenment. Striking at 9.30 am on All Saints' Day (1 November), it destroys much of Lisbon and many towns in parts of the Alentejo and Algarve (Faro, Lagos and Albufeira are devastated). In Lisbon, three major shocks within ten minutes, a host of rapidly spreading fires touched off by the candles of a hundred church altars, and a vast tsunami that engulfs the seafront, leave 40,000 dead out of a total population of 270,000. The Alfama district of the old city is largely untouched owing to its situation on a rocky massif, as is Belém. The Customs House is flooded and the India House and the English Factory destroyed, so that no trade can legitimately be conducted. The King proves himself able in crisis management and his illegitimate half-brothers, the royal dukes, organise defence, security, the burying of the dead and the continuance of religious observance. The disaster is described by Voltaire in Candide. Rebuilding begins immediately under the vigorous direction of Pombal, who now consolidates his position as Portugal's enlightened despot and leading statesman. It is decided to reconstruct Lisbon as the finest city in Europe, on the grid plan already adopted in the leading cities of Spanish America.
1759	13 January	The Duke of Aveiro together with members of the Távora family are executed for high-treason and attempted regicide by orders of the Marquis of Pombal.
1762		Spanish invasion of Portugal stopped with the help of Great Britain. (to 1763)
1769		The Lisbon Stock Exchange is created.
1777		Maria I of Portugal becomes Queen regnant. The King consort is her husband and uncle, Pedro III of Portugal. Pombal is dismissed.
1787		Pinto Revolt in Goa against Portuguese rule.
1792		João assumes royal responsibilities due to the declining mental health of his mother, Maria I of Portugal.
1799		João officially becomes prince regent

== 19th century ==
Year	Date	Event
1807	22 October	Portugal signs the Secret Convention on the Transfer of the Portuguese monarchy to Brazil with the UK.
1807	19–30 November	Napoleon Bonaparte, Emperor of the French, invades Portugal and the Portuguese Royal Family is transferred to the colony of Brazil, where it becomes the centre of the Portuguese Empire.
1808		Insurrection against Napoleon's general, Junot and landing of Arthur Wellesley (later Duke of Wellington) to defeat the French at the Battle of Vimeiro. Beginning of the Peninsular War.
1808	30 August	After being defeated at Vimeiro, the French forces sign the Convention of Cintra, ending the first French invasion of Portugal.
1809	3 February	The Second French invasion of Portugal begins, this time crossing the border at Minho.
1809	12 May	The French are defeated in the Second Battle of Porto, bringing an end to the second French invasion of Portugal.
1809	September	In the Battle of the Tiger's Mouth, Chinese pirates led by Zheng Yi Sao skirmish with the Portuguese fleet.
1809	3 November	The Lines of Torres Vedras start being built.
1810		French attack in 1810 led by Masséna repulsed at the Lines of Torres Vedras.
1813	21 June	The Battle of Vitoria takes place, in the context of the War of the Sixth Coalition. Portugal, together with Spain and the UK, defeat the French forces.
1815		The colony of Brazil is elevated to the status of kingdom. Portugal changes the official name from Kingdom of Portugal and the Algarves to United Kingdom of Portugal, Brazil and the Algarves.
1816		João VI of Portugal becomes king. Portugal is governed by a Regency council headed by Marshal Beresford, head of the Portuguese army in the Peninsular War.
1820		Liberal Revolution of 1820 against the British-led Regency of William Carr Beresford begins in Porto on 24 August. The Regency's troops decline to act against their countrymen and on 15 September declare for King, Cortes and Constitution. A provisional government is established on 1 October to oversee elections to the Cortes.
1820	10 to 27 December	The first ever parliamentary elections in Portugal take place, with the 1820 Portuguese legislative election who elected the Constituent Cortes of 1820.
1821	26 January	The Constituent Cortes hold their first meeting.
1821	9 March	The Constituent Cortes adopts a liberal parliamentary constitution (ratified 1822), inspired by the recent liberal advances in Spain, notably the 1812 Constitution of Cadiz.
1821		Metropolitan Portugal demands the return of João VI to Lisbon. João VI advises his son, Pedro, to declare the independence of Brazil and become its emperor, to ensure its continued rule by the Bragança dynasty.
1821	4 July	João VI lands in Portugal, but only after consenting to the restrictions on his power proposed by the Cortes and agreeing to accept the new constitution. His wife Queen Carlota Joaquina and younger son Dom Miguel refuse to do so and become the focus of a reactionary movement.
1821	1 October	João VI swears allegiance to the Portuguese Constitution of 1822.
1822	9 January	Prince Pedro declared that he would not comply with the orders of the Portuguese Cortes that demanded his return to Lisbon, in what is known as the Dia do Fico.
1822		Military coup against the parliamentarians. Fearing a move by France against democratic Portugal, or a civil war, Brigadier Saldanha, a grandson of the Marquis of Pombal, raises a small army and expels the 'constitutional extremists' from Lisbon. He proposes instead a compromise constitution in which the powers of the crown will be partially restored to the King. (This is the first of Saldanha's seven coups d'état in his career).
1822	7 September	Prince regent Pedro of Braganza declared Brazil's independence and becomes Emperor Pedro I of Brazil.
1822	23 September	Portugal's first constitution is ratified.
1822	4 November	The last meeting of the Constituent Cortes takes place.
1822	22 November	Parliamentary elections take place under the newly ratified constitution.
1823	27 May	In May a 'Regency of Portugal' is established by the expelled traditionalists who had opposed the constitution at Valladolid, under the presidency of the Patriarch of Lisbon and becomes a centre for plotting to put Dom Miguel on the throne. This event is known as Vilafrancada.
1824	30 April	Miguel attempts a coup d'etat but is defeated with British aid and goes into exile in Vienna. This event is known as the April Revolt.
1826	10 March	Death of João VI. The country is split between liberals and absolutists. Emperor Pedro I of Brazil becomes king Pedro IV of Portugal.
1826	2 May	Pedro IV of Portugal abdicates in favour of his daughter, Maria II of Portugal.
1826	23 April	Pedro IV of Portugal draws up a new constitution, somewhat less liberal than that of 1820 and based upon the Brazilian constitution, and invites all parties to accept it. This constitution (the Charter of 1826) assigns authority to the crown to moderate between the legislative, executive and judicial powers of the state and proposes a House of Lords of 72 aristocrats and 19 bishops. Miguel (in Vienna) makes a show of agreement.
1826	8 to 17 October	The 1826 Portuguese legislative election takes place, the first under the Charter of 1826.
1827	July	Pedro names his brother Dom Miguel as Lieutenant and Regent of the Kingdom. Miguel leaves Vienna and visits Paris and London on his way to Portugal.
1828	February	Miguel returns to Portugal, ostensibly to take the oath of allegiance to the Charter and assume the regency. He was immediately proclaimed king by his supporters, who pressed him to return to absolutism.
1828	13 March	Dom Miguel abolishes parliament and the constitution, re-instituting the medieval Cortes.
1828	18 May	The garrison in Porto, the center of Portuguese progressives, declared its loyalty to Pedro IV and his daughter Maria II, and the Constitutional Charter. Beginning of civil war, known as the Liberal Wars.
1828	11 July	Dom Miguel becomes Miguel I of Portugal, as proclaimed by the medieval Cortes he summed.
1828	May	The 1828 Portuguese legislative election takes place, electing seats to the People's Branch of the new medieval-styled Three Estates Cortes.
1829	11 August	In the Battle of Praia da Vitória, the Miguelites under command of José António Azevedo e Lemos attempted to disembark troops on Terceira island, but were defeated by the liberal troops under command of the Duke of Terceira.
1831	7 April	Emperor Pedro I of Brazil abdicates in favour of his son Pedro II of Brazil and sets out to regain Portugal for his daughter.
1832		Pedro's expeditionary force of Portuguese exiles and foreign mercenaries gathers in Terceira, regains the Azores, then sails for Portugal. Pedro is supported by Britain and France and the Portuguese intelligentsia, including the politically ambitious soldiers Saldanha and Sá da Bandeira.
1832	9 July	Pedro lands at Pampelido north of Porto, where he is closely besieged by some 13,000 Miguelites across the River Douro. His defending force, the city garrison being commanded by Sá da Bandeira, includes an international brigade with a British contingent under Charles Shaw and Colonel George Lloyd Hodges. The city suffers cholera, starvation and bombardment.
1833		Miguel's navy is defeated by Pedro's Admiral Charles Napier at the fourth Battle of Cape St Vincent. The Duke of Terceira defeats Miguel's army at Almada and occupies Lisbon.
1834	16 May	The Duke of Terceira wins the Battle of Asseiceira. Miguel capitulates at EvoraMonte on 26 May. End of the civil war: Miguel is exiled to Genoa, where he renounces his capitulation. For many years he plots his return, but is never able to put it into effect. After six years of bitter and destructive war the country is once again bankrupt and beholden to foreign creditors, and the constitutional radicals turn their anger against the landowners and ecclesiastical institutions that had supported Miguel. The crown lands (a quarter of the national territory) are taken over by the state to help pay the national debt.
1834	13 to 27 July	The 1834 Portuguese legislative election takes place under the Charter of 1826. The supporters of the Charter win a plurality of votes.
1834	24 September	Death of Dom Pedro. Maria II of Portugal becomes queen in her own right. Pedro de Sousa Holstein, 1st Duke of Palmela, becomes the first prime minister of Portugal. Dissolution of the monasteries – over 300 monastic communities are abolished – however the sale of church and crown lands does not revitalise Portugal in the way that had been anticipated.
1835	26 January	Queen Maria II marries Auguste, Duke of Leuchtenberg, who becomes the first Prince Consort of Portugal.
1835	28 March	Auguste, Prince Consort of Portugal, dies of an illness.
1835	15 April	After a piece of legislation was drafted on 15 April 1835, which provided for the sale of national property and property of the Catholic Church, and facilitated their disposal among leading members of the liberal party, the Devourism period begins.
1835	4 May	Vitório Maria de Sousa Coutinho, 2nd Count of Linhares becomes prime minister of Portugal.
1835	27 May	João Carlos de Saldanha Oliveira e Daun, 1st Duke of Saldanha becomes prime minister of Portugal.
1835		Revolutionary fervour is rekindled by an urban uprising and a military coup d’etat. The national Guard sides with the insurgents and approved the call for Sá da Bandeira to lead the nation and bring back the constitution of 1822. Queen Maria is forced to swear allegiance to the 1822 constitution but the moderate leader, Saldanha, reaches an accommodation with Sá da Bandeira and a modest programme of modernisation can begin.
1835	18 November	José Jorge Loureiro becomes prime minister of Portugal.
1836	17 and 31 July	The July 1836 Portuguese legislative election takes place under the Charter of 1826. The Cartistas (who support the Charter) win a majority of votes.
1836	9 April	Queen Maria II marries Prince Ferdinand of Saxe-Coburg-Gotha, who becomes Prince Consort of Portugal.
1836	20 April	António José Severim de Noronha, 1st Duke of Terceira becomes prime minister of Portugal.
1836	9 September	The September Revolution coup, led by Passos Manuel, ends the Devourism period. The Constitution of 1822 is restored.
1836	10 September	José da Gama Carneiro e Sousa becomes Prime Minister of Portugal after the September revolution events.
1836	3 to 5 of November	In the Belenzada, Queen Maria II and her husband Ferdinand II attempt a coup to remove the liberal government established by the September revolution and place José Bernardino de Portugal e Castro as prime minister, but the coup fails and José is nominally prime minister for 2 days (he did not take office). Bernardo de Sá Nogueira de Figueiredo, 1st Marquis of Sá da Bandeira becomes prime minister instead.
1836	20 November	The November 1836 Portuguese legislative election takes place under the 1822 constitution. The supporters of the September revolution win the majority of votes.
1837	1 June	António Dias de Oliveira becomes prime minister.
1837	12 July	In the Revolt of the Marshals, a group of Marshals attempts to bring back the Charter of 1826 but fail.
1837	2 August	Sá da Bandeira becomes prime minister again.
1837	16 September	With the birth of Prince Pedro by Queen Maria II, his father, then Prince Consort of Portugal, becomes Ferdinand II of Portugal, co-ruler with Queen Maria II.
1838	13 March	In the Rossio massacre, forces loyal to the Portuguese government of Prime Minister Sá da Bandeira put down a revolt by radical sections of the National Guard and their supporters.
1838	24 April	The Portuguese Constitution of 1838 is promulgated.
1838	12 August and 12 September	The 1838 Portuguese legislative election takes place, the first under the 1838 Constitution. A coalition of Septembrist and Charter supported wins the elections.
1839	18 April	Rodrigo Pinto Pizarro becomes prime minister, the last government fully composed of members in support of the September revolution.
1839	26 November	The Conde do Bonfim becomes prime minister with a coalition government.
1840	22 March	The 1840 Portuguese legislative election takes place, with Conde do Bonfim remaining prime minister.
1841	9 June	Joaquim António de Aguiar becomes prime minister.
1842	7 to 9 February	Marquis of Palmela served briefly as Prime Minister again (for two days, in the so-called Shrovetide Cabinet).
1842	9 February	The Duke of Terceira becomes prime minister again. Start of Cabralism, in which António Bernardo da Costa Cabral, 1st Marquis of Tomar dominated Portuguese politics.
1842	5 and 19 June	The 1842 Portuguese legislative election takes place, with the Charter supporters winning the election with a plurality of votes.
1843		Fernando II commissions the German architect Baron Eschwege to begin the building of the Pena Palace at Sintra.
1845	3 and 17 August	The 1845 Portuguese legislative election takes place. The result was a victory for the Cabralistas, with Miguelistas advising voters to boycott the elections.
1846		The Revolution of Maria da Fonte, a 'peasants' revolt' inaugurates the last phase of the Revolution, starting as an uprising of the peasants of the Minho, largely led by women (their movement is named after the semi-mythical 'Maria da Fonte') against land enclosures and new land taxes demanded by the Costa Cabral government to finance its grandiose public works. They make common cause with the clergy and call for the return of the exiled Miguel as their saviour. Martial law is declared but soldiers refuse to fire on their kin. Fall of the Costa Cabral government and substitution of a government of national reconciliation in Lisbon. Autumn: A revolutionary government is proclaimed in Porto with Sá da Bandeira at its head. He opens negotiations with Britain, whence Costa Cabral has fled into exile, and settles terms for his return to take responsibility for the national debt. Civil war between the supporters of Queen Maria and the radical constitutionalists. The Count of Bonfim, for the Porto junta, is defeated by Saldanha at the siege of Torres Vedras and exiled to Angola.
1846	20 May	The Marquis of Palmela becomes prime minister for the third time.
1846	6 October	Duke of Saldanha becomes prime minister for the second time as an outcome of the Emboscada, in which Queen Maria II successfully deposed the Marquis of Palmela.
1846		As a result of the Emboscada, the Patuleia begins. An eight-month civil war putting those who defended the Constitutional Charter (and the Queen) against a coalition of Septembristas and Miguelistas.
1847	29 June	Convention of Gramido brings the civil war to an end. The Cartistas win with the support of the 1834 Quadruple Alliance. Return of the political exiles from Angola.
1847	28 November and 12 December	The 1847 Portuguese legislative election takes place.
1849	18 June	António Bernardo da Costa Cabral, 1st Marquis of Tomar becomes prime minister.
1849	25 August	In the Passaleão incident, Chinese troops attempt to take Macau but fail to do so.
1851	26 April	Duke of Terceira becomes prime-minister for the third time.
1851		Another coup d’etat by Saldanha. He ejects Costa Cabral, appoints himself prime minister and rules reasonably progressively from the house of lords for a full five-year term. Thus a proper parliamentary regime is finally established, with a two-party system and a bourgeois monarchy. Portugal enters its Age of Regeneration, with an old-fashioned cavalry officer in charge. The government embarks on an elaborate programme of public works to modernise the country, beginning with the establishment of a modern post office and a programme of road-building: in the entire country there is less than 200 km of all-weather road surface, and the government uses road taxes to finance 200 km of new road per year.
1851	1 May	Duke of Saldanha becomes prime-minister for the third time.
1851	2 and 16 November 1851	The 1851 Portuguese legislative election takes place, Duke of Saldanha supporters win the elections.
1851		The Regenerator Party is founded.
1852	12 December	The 1852 Portuguese legislative election takes place.
1852		The Historic Party is founded.
1853	15 November	Queen Maria II dies in childbirth, Pedro V of Portugal, her son, becomes king.
1856	30 April	Pedro V founds the Associação Naval de Lisboa, Portugal's oldest sports club.
1856	6 June	Nuno José Severo de Mendoça Rolim de Moura Barreto, 1st Duke of Loulé becomes prime-minister.
1856	28 October	Opening of Portugal's first railway line (between Lisbon and Carregado).
1856	9 November	The 1856 Portuguese legislative election takes place. The Historic Party wins an absolute majority.
1858	2 May	The 1858 Portuguese legislative election takes place with the Historic Party winning a second absolute majority.
1859	16 March	The Duke of Terceira becomes prime minister for the 4th time.
1860	1 January	The 1860 Portuguese legislative election takes place. The Regenerator Party, together with the Cabralistas, wins an absolute majority.
1860	1 May	The Duke of Terceira dies due to an illness. Joaquim António de Aguiar becomes prime minister for the second time.
1860	4 July	The Duke of Loulé becomes prime minister for the second time.
1861	22 April	The 1861 Portuguese legislative election takes place. The Historic Party recovers its absolute majority.
1861	11 November	Amidst the 1846–1860 cholera pandemic, King Pedro V dies and Luis I of Portugal, his brother, becomes king.
1864	11 September	The 1834 Portuguese legislative election takes place. The Historic Party keeps its absolute majority.
1865	17 April	The Marquis Sá da Bandeira becomes prime minister for the third time.
1865	8 July	The 1865 Portuguese legislative election takes place. A coalition of the Historic Party and the Regeneration Party win the election and form a government under Joaquim António de Aguiar, against the Duke of Loulé.
1865	4 September	Joaquim António de Aguiar becomes prime minister for the third time.
1867	4 February	The 1867 Portuguese legislative election takes place, with a victory for the parties opposing Joaquim António de Aguiar, but he would not life office until the Janeirinha protests in 1986.
1867	1 July	After the legislation of 1852 regarding political crimes, the Penal and Prison Reform abolishes the death penalty for all civilian crimes.
1868	1 January	A movement known as Janeirinha protests against the tax on consumables and went on to carry out administrative reform of the country.
1868	4 January	The Janeirinha movement forces Joaquim António de Aguiar to resign, António José de Ávila, 1st Duke of Ávila and Bolama becomes prime-minister.
1868	22 March and 12 April	The 1868 Portuguese legislative election takes place. Victory for the Reformist Party, which was founded as a breakaway from the History party over the Janeirinha events, in a coalition with the Duke of Ávila and Bolama supporters.
1868	22 July	Marquis of Sá da Bandeira becomes prime minister for the 4th time.
1869	11 April 1869	The 1869 Portuguese legislative election takes place. The Reformist Party maintains the absolute majority.
1869		The government of Sá da Bandeira formally abolishes slavery in all Portuguese territories.
1869	11 August	Duke of Loulé becomes prime-minister for the 3rd time.
1870	13 March	The March 1870 Portuguese legislative election takes place. The Historic Party wins an absolute majority.
1870	19 May	A financial crisis in the wake of European recession brings the fall of the government and yet another coup d’etat by the aged Duque de Saldanha, who becomes prime-minister.
1870	29 August	Luis I dismisses Duque de Saldanha and nominates Marquis of Sá da Bandeira who becomes prime-minister for the 5th time.
1870	18 September	The September 1870 Portuguese legislative election takes place. The Reformist Party wins an absolute majority.
1870	29 October	Marquis of Ávila becomes prime-minister for the 2nd time.
1871	9 July	The 1871 Portuguese legislative election takes place. The Historic Party wins a plurality of votes.
1871	13 September	Fontes Pereira de Melo becomes prime-minister.
1874	12 July	The 1874 Portuguese legislative election takes place. The Regenerator Party wins an absolute majority.
1876	25 March	The Portuguese Republican Party is founded.
1876	7 September	The Progressive Party is founded by merging the Historic and Reformist parties.
1877	6 March	Marquis of Ávila becomes prime-minister for the 3rd time.
1878	26 January	Fontes Pereira de Melo becomes prime-minister for the 2nd time.
1878	29 May	Anselmo José Braamcamp becomes prime-minister.
1878	13 October	The 1878 Portuguese legislative election takes place. The Regenerator Party keeps its absolute majority.
1879	19 October	The 1879 Portuguese legislative election takes place. The Progressive Party wins an absolute majority.
1881	23 March	António Rodrigues Sampaio becomes prime-minister.
1881	21 August	The 1881 Portuguese legislative election takes place. The Regenerator Party wins an absolute majority.
1881	14 November	Fontes Pereira de Melo becomes prime-minister for the 3rd time.
1884	29 June	The 1884 Portuguese legislative election takes place. The Regenerator Party keeps its absolute majority.
1884	15 November	Portugal takes part in the Berlin Conference.
1885		The Pink Map is published, representing Portugal's claim of sovereignty over a land corridor connecting the Portuguese colonies of Angola and Mozambique during the Scramble for Africa.
1886	16 February	José Luciano de Castro becomes prime-minister.
1887	6 March	The 1887 Portuguese legislative election takes place. The Progressive Party wins an absolute majority.
1887	1 December	Portugal and China sign the Sino-Portuguese Treaty of Peking, in the aftermath of the Second Opium War.
1889	19 October	Luís I dies of neurosyphilis. Carlos I of Portugal, Luís' son, becomes king.
1889	20 October	The 1889 Portuguese legislative election takes place. The Progressive Party keeps its absolute majority.
1890	11 January	The British Government presents the Kingdom of Portugal with an Ultimatum.
1890	14 January	António de Serpa Pimentel becomes prime-minister.
1890	30 March	The 1890 Portuguese legislative election takes place. The Regenerator Party wins an absolute majority.
1890	11 October	João Crisóstomo de Abreu e Sousa becomes prime-minister.
1891	31 January	Republican insurrection in Porto. It is violently put down by the authorities, who afterwards institute a tight press censorship. Opponents of the government are accused of anarchism and exiled to the colonies.
1891	11 June	Portugal signs the Anglo-Portuguese Treaty of 1891.
1892	18 January	José Dias Ferreira becomes prime-minister.
1892	23 October	The 1892 Portuguese legislative election takes place. The Regenerator Party keeps its absolute majority.
1893	22 February	Ernesto Rodolfo Hintze Ribeiro becomes prime-minister.
1894	15 April	The 1894 Portuguese legislative election takes place. The Regenerator Party again keeps its absolute majority.
1895	7 November	The Battle of Coolela takes place. Portugal wins, defeating the Gaza Empire.
1895	17 November	The 1895 Portuguese legislative election takes place. The Regenerator Party wins again, but the Progressive Party and the Portuguese Republican Party boycott the elections.
1897	30 January	An arbitration by Italy finally establishes the international boundary between the British colony of Southern Rhodesia and Portugal's Mozambique colony.
1897	5 February	José Luciano de Castro Pereira Corte-Real becomes prime-minister.
1897	2 May	The 1897 Portuguese legislative election takes place. The Progressive Party wins a majority of votes.
1899	14 October	Portugal signs the Treaty of Windsor with the United Kingdom, marking the restoration of Anglo-Portuguese relation.
1899	26 November	The 1899 Portuguese legislative election takes place. The Progressive Party keeps its majority.

== 20th century ==
Year	Date	Event
1905		The Progressive Dissidence party is founded by Minister of Justice José Maria de Alpoim as a breakaway from the Progressive Party.
1906	May	João Franco is appointed as Prime Minister of Portugal.
1906		Big strike of the typographers.
1906		Foundation of the Escola Superior Colonial (Superior Colonial School)
1907		João Franco establishes a Dictatorship within the framework of the Monarchy.
1907		Student's strike at the University of Coimbra.
1908		The Portuguese Republican Party manages to elect all its candidates in the local elections of Lisbon.
1908	28 January	Failed Republican revolutionary attempt. The conspirators are arrested.
1908	1 February	Lisbon Regicide: King Carlos I of Portugal and his son and heir, prince Luis Filipe, Duke of Braganza, are killed in the Regicide of Lisbon by Alfredo Luís da Costa and Manuel Buíça, republicans of the Carbonária (the Portuguese section of the Carbonari).
1908	1 February	Manuel II of Portugal, King Carlos's youngest son, becomes king.
1909		King Manuel II of Portugal goes on a personal trip to Madrid, London and Paris.
1909		The Portuguese Republican Party's Conference takes place in Setúbal, where the motion to accelerate the revolutionary movement to establish the Republic is approved.
1909		In Lisbon a demonstration with more than 100,000 persons protests against the political and economical situation of the Monarchy.
1910	31 August	Gafanha da Nazaré is founded by Prior Sardo and is bestowed to become a parish by the king Manuel II. Officially being the last town to receive such royal distinction by a Portuguese monarch.
1910	4 October	Beginning of the Republican Revolution.
1910	5 October	The Portuguese Republic is officially proclaimed in Lisbon. End of the Monarchy. Teófilo Braga is the president of the Provisional Government.
1910	5 October	The last King of Portugal, Manuel II of Portugal, and the Portuguese Royal Family embark in Ericeira for exile in England.
1911	28 May	Constituent National Assembly election, the Democratic Party wins a majority of 229 of the 234 seats.
1911	24 August	Indirect presidential election. Manuel de Arriaga wins in the 1st round.
1911	3 September	João Pinheiro Chagas is appointed prime-minister.
1911	13 November	Augusto de Vasconcelos is appointed prime-minister.
1911		East Timorese rebellion.
1912	16 June	Duarte Leite is appointed prime-minister.
1912	8 July	The royalist attack on Chaves, led by Henrique Mitchell de Paiva Cabral Couceiro, fails to reinstate the Monarchy.
1912	23 September	Augusto de Vasconcelos becomes interim prime-minister.
1913	9 January	Afonso Costa is appointed prime-minister.
1913	16 November	Legislative election, the Democratic Party wins a plurality of 68 of the 153 seats in the Chamber of Deputies and 24 of the 71 seats in the Senate.
1914	9 February	Bernardino Machado is appointed prime-minister.
1914	12 December	Victor Hugo de Azevedo Coutinho is appointed prime-minister.
1915	28 January	Pimenta de Castro is appointed prime-minister.
1915	14 May	A revolt brings the end of Pimenta de Castro's government. A Constitutional Junta is formed.
1915	15 May	João Pinheiro Chagas is appointed prime-minister for a second time, but he did not take office.
1915	17 May	José de Castro is appointed prime-minister.
1915	29 May	Indirect presidential election to select someone to complete Manuel de Arriaga's term. Teófilo Braga wins in the 1st round.
1915	6 August	Indirect presidential election. Bernardino Machado wins in the 3rd round.
1915	13 June	Legislative election, the Democratic Party wins a majority of 106 of the 163 seats in the Chamber of Deputies and 45 of the 69 seats in the Senate.
1915	29 November	Afonso Costa is appointed prime-minister a second time.
1916	16 March	António José de Almeida is appointed prime-minister.
1916	7 August	The Portuguese Parliament accepts the participation of Portugal in the first world war, following the invitation of the British government to join the allied forces
1917	2 February	The first members of the Portuguese Expeditionary Corps arrive in France.
1917	25 April	Afonso Costa is appointed prime-minister a third time.
1917	7 October	José Norton de Matos is appointed prime-minister.
1917	25 October	Afonso Costa is appointed prime-minister a fourth time.
1917	17 November	José Norton de Matos becomes interim prime-minister.
1917	5 – 8 December	The December 1917 coup d'état marks the beginning of Sidónio Pais' rise to power. He leads the Military Junta.
1918	28 April	Sidónio Pais (National Republican Party) wins the 1918 Portuguese general election. He ran unopposed.
1918	11 November	The Armistice of 11 November 1918 marks the end of World War I.
1918	14 December	Sidónio Pais is assassinated in the Rossio railway station. João do Canto e Castro succeeds Pais in leading the government.
1918	16 December	Indirect presidential election. João do Canto e Castro wins in the 2nd round.
1918	23 December	João Tamagnini Barbosa is appointed prime-minister.
1919	15 January	The Monarchy of the North is proclaimed in Porto, and the restoration of the Portuguese monarchy lasts for about a month before being crushed by republican forces.
1919	22 January	The Monarchy is proclaimed in Lisbon, in the Assault of Monsanto.
1919	24 January	The Monarchic forces in Monsanto surrender, leading to the resignation of João Tamagnini two days later.
1919	27 January	José Relvas is appointed prime-minister.
1919	30 March	Domingos Leite Pereira is appointed prime-minister.
1919	11 May	Legislative election, the Democratic Party wins a majority of 86 of the 163 seats in the Chamber of Deputies and 36 of the 71 seats in the Senate.
1919	30 June	Alfredo de Sá Cardoso is appointed prime-minister.
1919	6 December	Indirect presidential election. António José de Almeida wins in the 3rd round.in the 3rd round.
1920	15 January	Francisco José Fernandes Costa is appointed prime minister. He did not take office and Alfredo de Sá Cardoso is re-appointed prime-minister.
1920	21 January	Domingos Leite Pereira is appointed prime-minister a second time.
1920	8 March	António Maria Baptista is appointed prime-minister.
1920	6 June	José Ramos Preto is appointed prime-minister, after António Maria Baptista suddenly dies.
1920	26 June	António Maria da Silva is appointed prime-minister.
1920	19 July	António Granjo is appointed prime-minister.
1920	20 November	Álvaro de Castro is appointed prime-minister.
1920	30 November	Liberato Pinto is appointed prime-minister.
1921	2 March	Bernardino Luís Machado Guimarães is appointed prime-minister a second time.
1921	6 March	The Portuguese Communist Party was founded from the ranks of the Portuguese Maximalist Federation as the Portuguese Section of the Communist International.
1921	23 May	Tomé de Barros Queirós is appointed prime-minister.
1921	10 July	Legislative election, the Republican Liberal Party wins a plurality of 79 of the 163 seats in the Chamber of Deputies and 32 of the 71 seats in the Senate.
1921	6 August	Indirect presidential election. Manuel Teixeira Gomes wins in the 3rd round.
1921	30 August	António Granjo is appointed prime-minister a second time.
1921	19 October	In the Bloody Night, then-head of Government António Granjo (Republican Liberal Party) is killed, along with other politician associates of his. Manuel Maria Coelho is appointed prime-minister.
1921	5 November	Carlos Maia Pinto is appointed prime-minister.
1921	16 December	Francisco Cunha Leal is appointed prime-minister.
1922	29 January	Legislative election, the Democratic Party wins a plurality of 74 of the 163 seats in the Chamber of Deputies and 37 of the 70 seats in the Senate.
1922	7 February	António Maria da Silva is appointed prime-minister a second time.
1922	1 August	Portugal receives the Balfour Note, requiring that the loan Portugal had from the UK be paid back.
1923	15 November	António Ginestal Machado is appointed prime-minister.
1923	18 December	Álvaro de Castro is appointed prime-minister a second time.
1924	7 July	Alfredo Rodrigues Gaspar is appointed prime-minister.
1924	22 November	José Domingues dos Santos is appointed prime-minister.
1925	15 February	Vitorino Guimarães is appointed prime-minister.
1925	5 March	First failed coup attempt by Filomeno da Câmara.
1925	18 April	Second failed coup attempt by Filomena da Câmara, now with the aid of Raul Esteves.
1925	1 July	António Maria da Silva is appointed prime-minister a third time.
1925	19 July	Failed coup attempt by Mendes Cabeçadas.
1925	1 August	Domingos Leite Pereira is appointed prime-minister a third time.
1925	8 November	Legislative election, the Democratic Party wins a majority of 83 of the 163 seats in the Chamber of Deputies and 39 of the 65 seats in the Senate.
1925	11 December	Indirect presidential election. Bernardino Machado is elected President of the Republic for the 2nd time.
1925	18 December	António Maria da Silva is appointed prime-minister a fourth time.
1926	27 May	The General Manuel de Oliveira Gomes da Costa arrives at Braga with the purpose of initiating a Coup d'état.
1926	27 May	The Republican Government and Prime Minister António Maria da Silva, knowing of the forthcoming coup, try to organise resistance believing the uprising can be defeated.
1926	28 May	A Military coup d'état (henceforth known as the 28th May 1926 coup d'état) begins in Braga led by Gomes da Costa. Believing to have failed, Gomes da Costa announces his surrender.
1926	29 May	The Portuguese Communist Party interrupts its 2nd Congress due to the political and military situation.
1926	29 May	The Confederação Geral do Trabalho (national trade union centre) declares its neutrality in the military confrontations.
1926	29 May	The Military Coup spreads to the rest of the country, by influence of Mendes Cabeçadas, Sinel de Cordes and Óscar Carmona, and establishes the Ditadura Nacional (National Dictatorship) against the democratic but unstable 1st Republic.
1926	29 May	The Government of Prime Minister António Maria da Silva resigns.
1926	30 May	The General Gomes da Costa is acclaimed in Porto.
1926	30 May	The President of the Republic, Bernardino Machado, resigns.
1926	30 May	José Mendes Cabeçadas Júnior becomes Prime Minister and President of the Republic.
1926	3 June	António de Oliveira Salazar becomes Minister of Finance, he resigns 16 days after nomination.
1926	3 June	The Congress of the Republic of Portugal (National Assembly) is dissolved by dictatorial decree.
1926	3 June	All heads of Municipalities are substituted.
1926	3 June	The Carbonária (the Portuguese section of the Carbonari) is banned.
1926	3 June	All Political parties are banned.
1926	17 June	General Gomes da Costa provokes a military coup.
1926	19 June	General Gomes da Costa becomes Prime Minister.
1926	22 June	Censorship is instituted.
1926	29 June	General Gomes da Costa becomes President of the Republic.
1926	9 July	General Gomes da Costa is obliged to step down and goes into exile.
1926	9 July	General António Óscar de Fragoso Carmona, of the conservative military wing, becomes Prime Minister.
1926	15 September	Failed military coup.
1926	18 September	Failed military coup.
1926	29 November	General António Óscar Carmona becomes President of the Republic.
1926	16 December	The Police of Information of Lisbon, a Political Police, is created.
1927		The Confederação Geral do Trabalho (national trade union centre) is dissolved.
1927	February	Failed Republican coup attempt against the Ditadura Nacional in Porto (2 to 7) and Lisbon (7 to 9).
1927	26 March	The Police of Information of Porto, a Political Police, is created.
1927	17 May	Minimum School years are reduced from the 6th to the 4th grade; in all levels of non-university schooling students are divided by sex.
1927	August	Failed right wing military coup.
1927	1 December	Students demonstrate in Lisbon against the Ditadura Nacional.
1928		General António Óscar de Fragoso Carmona remains President of the Republic.
1928		Acordo Missionário (Missionary Agreement) between the Catholic Church and the Portuguese Republic, giving special status to the action of the Catholic Church in Portugal's colonies.
1928		Failed Republican revolutionary attempt against the Ditadura Nacional.
1928		The Portuguese Communist Party's Main Office is closed.
1928	February	The Comissão de Propaganda da Ditadura (Commission for the Propaganda of the Dictatorship) is created.
1928	17 March	The Police of Information of Porto and Lisbon are fused.
1928	18 April	General José Vicente de Freitas becomes Prime Minister.
1928	26 April	António de Oliveira Salazar becomes Minister of Finance for the 2nd time.
1928	20 July	Failed Republican coup attempt against the Ditadura Nacional.
1929		Catholic religious institutes are again permitted in Portugal.
1929		The Portuguese Communist Party is reorganised under Bento Gonçalves. Adapting the Party to its new illegal status, the reorganisation creates a net of clandestine cells to avoid the wave of detentions.
1929	8 July	Artur Ivens Ferraz becomes Prime Minister.
1930		The Acto Colonial (Colonial Act) is published, defining the status of Portuguese colonies (Angola, Cabinda, Cape Verde, Portuguese Guinea, São Tomé and Príncipe, Mozambique, Portuguese India, Portuguese Timor and Macau).
1930		The fundamental principles of the new regime are presented by António de Oliveira Salazar in the 4th anniversary of the 28 May Revolution.
1930	21 January	Domingos da Costa e Oliveira becomes Prime Minister.
1930	4 April	A Republican coup attempt against the Ditadura Nacional starts in Madeira. It would then expand to Azores and Portuguese Guinea, before dying out on 2 May 1931.
1931	26 August	Failed Republican coup attempt against the Ditadura Nacional in Lisbon. There would be no remaining coup attempts during the Ditadura Nacional.
1932	5 July	António de Oliveira Salazar becomes Prime Minister.
1933		A new Constitution is approved in a false referendum, defining Portugal as a Corporative, Single Party and Multi-continental country (in Europe, Africa, Asia and Oceania).
1933		A fascist-leaning right-wing Dictatorial regime entitled Estado Novo is installed.
1933		The Single Party União Nacional (National Union) is created.
1933		The Estatuto do Trabalho Nacional (Code of National Labour) is published, prohibiting all free trade unions.
1933		A Political Police, the PVDE (Polícia de Vigilância e de Defesa do Estado; State Defence and Vigilance Police) is created.
1933		Censorship, particularly of the Mass media, is systematic and generalised.
1935		The Portuguese Communist Party's Secretary General Bento Gonçalves participates in the 7th Congress of the Comintern. Soon after returning to Portugal he is arrested by the Political Police PVDE.
1936		The concentration camp for political prisoners of Tarrafal is created in the colony of Portuguese Cape Verde, under direct control of the political police PVDE.
1936		The political police PVDE focuses its action against Communism and the underground Portuguese Communist Party. During this pre-World War II period, several Italian Fascist and German Nazi advisors came to Portugal, to help the PVDE adopt a model similar to the Gestapo.
1936	19 May	Creation of the Mocidade Portuguesa (Portuguese Youth), a compulsory paramilitary youth organisation similar to the Hitler Youth.
1936	July	Beginning of the Spanish Civil War; Portugal promptly supports Nationalist Spain under General Francisco Franco and sends military aid (the Battalion of the Viriatos) in their fight against the Spanish Republicans.
1937	December	The female section of the Mocidade Portuguesa is created.
1939		The Iberian Neutrality Pact is put forward by Salazar to Francisco Franco.
1942		Salazar meets with Spanish dictator Francisco Franco.
1942	19 February	Japanese forces invade Portuguese Timor in the Battle of Timor.
1942		The Portuguese Communist Party's Secretary General Bento Gonçalves dies in the concentration camp of Tarrafal.
1944		An international embargo on tungsten, which Portugal initially exported to both factions of World War II, and the longest drought on mainland Portugal lead to an economic recession that would last until 1945.
1945		The Political Police PVDE is reorganised and renamed PIDE (Polícia Internacional e de Defesa do Estado; International Police for the Defence of the State).
1945	8 October	The MUD (Movimento de Unidade Democrática – Movement of Democratic Unity) is created with official permission.
1948	January	The MUD is banished.
1949		The President António Óscar Carmona meets with Spanish dictator Francisco Franco.
1949		Spanish dictator Francisco Franco receives a Doctorate honoris causa by the University of Coimbra.
1949		In the (forged) Presidential elections, General Norton de Matos, backed by the oppositionist illegal organisation MUD tries and fail to win the Presidency of the Republic.
1949	4 April	Portugal is a founding member of NATO.
1949		For the first time, a Portuguese citizen is awarded with the Nobel Prize: Egas Moniz, with the Nobel Prize in Physiology or Medicine.
1951		António de Oliveira Salazar becomes Provisional President of the Republic due to the death of President António Óscar de Fragoso Carmona.
1951		Francisco Higino Craveiro Lopes becomes President of the Republic.
1951		The Portuguese government overhauls the entire colonial system in an attempt to curb criticism on Portuguese Colonialism, all Portugal's colonies were renamed Portuguese Overseas Provinces.
1951		Due to a bad harvest year and lower external demand for Portuguese goods, Portugal enters an economic recession that would last until 1953.
1954		The Dadra and Nagar Haveli Portuguese enclave, dependent of Daman, is occupied by India.
1956		Amílcar Cabral founds the PAIGC (Partido Africano da Independência da Guiné e Cabo Verde, African Party for the Independence of Guinea and Cape Verde).
1956	December	The MPLA, Movimento Popular de Libertação de Angola (Popular Movement for the Liberation of Angola), is founded by Agostinho Neto.
1957		Frente Nacional de Libertação de Angola (National Front for the Liberation of Angola), is founded as União das Populações do Norte de Angola (Union of the Populations of Northern Angola).
1957	7 March	First live event of the Portuguese National Television and the beginning of the regular broadcasting. It was opened by the famous and former BBC war reporter, Fernando Pessa.
1958		Américo Thomaz becomes President of the Republic.
1959		Pijiguiti Massacre – Portuguese soldiers open fire on protesting dockworkers in Bissau (Portuguese Guinea), killing 50.
1960	January	A group of ten Portuguese Communist Party members escaped from the high-security prison in Peniche. Among the escapees was Álvaro Cunhal.
1960	4 January	Portugal is one of the founding member of the EFTA – European Free Trade Association.
1961		The Prime Minister António de Oliveira Salazar takes on himself the office of Minister of National Defence and reorganises the Government to face the war in Africa.
1961	4 February	The Portuguese Colonial War starts in Portuguese Angola with the attacks to the Prison, Police headquarters and Radio central in Luanda.
1961	15 March	Attacks in northern Angola by the UPA (União do Povo Angolano; Union of the Angolan People), against Portuguese colonists and African populations, provoking hundreds of deaths.
1961	29 March	Portugal joins the International Monetary fund.
1961	12 December	The Indian army conquers Portuguese Goa.
1961	19 December	The Indian army conquers Portuguese Daman and Diu.
1962		The PAIGC Guerrilla warfare against the Portuguese begins with an abortive attack on Praia.
1962	24 March	The Academic Crisis of '62 culminates in a huge student demonstration in Lisbon brutally repressed by the shock police, which caused hundreds of students to be seriously injured.
1962	25 June	The FRELIMO – Frente de Libertação de Moçambique (Mozambican Liberation Front) is founded in Dar es Salaam (Tanzania).
1963		The FLEC (Frente para a Libertação do Enclave de Cabinda; Front for the Liberation of the Enclave of Cabinda) is founded.
1963	January	Amílcar Cabral and PAIGC declare full-scale war against the Portuguese in Portuguese Guinea.
1964		The FRELIMO controls most of Northern Portuguese Mozambique.
1964	February	The first Party Congress of the PAIGC takes place at liberated Cassaca, in which both the political and military arms of the PAIGC were assessed and reorganised, with a regular army (The People's Army) to supplement the guerrilla forces (The People's Guerillas).
1965		6th Congress of the Portuguese Communist Party, one of the most important congresses in the Party's history, after Álvaro Cunhal released the report The Path to Victory – The tasks of the Party in the National and Democratic Revolution, which became an important document in the anti-dictatorship struggle.
1966		The UNITA – União Nacional para a Independência Total de Angola (National Union for Total Independence of Angola) is founded by Jonas Savimbi.
1966	6 August	The Salazar Bridge is inaugurated in Lisbon above the Tagus river. It is the longest suspension bridge in Europe and a replica (made by the same engineers) of the Golden Gate bridge in San Francisco.
1967		By this time the PAIGC had carried out 147 attacks on Portuguese barracks and army encampments, and effectively controlled 2/3 of Portuguese Guinea.
1968		Reorganisation of the Government.
1968		Portugal begins a new campaign against the guerrillas in Portuguese Guinea with the arrival of the new governor of the colony, General António de Spínola.
1968	25 September	António de Oliveira Salazar leaves the Government due to health problems.
1968	28 September	Marcello das Neves Alves Caetano becomes Prime Minister.
1969		The Single Party União Nacional is renamed Acção Nacional Popular (National Popular Action).
1969		The Political Police PIDE is renamed DGS (Direcção Geral de Segurança, Directorate-General of Security).
1969		Beginning of the Primavera Marcelista (Marcelist Springtime), a timid and failed opening of the regime.
1970		Portugal invades Conakry, in the Republic of Guinea, 400 amphibious troops attacked the city and freed dozens of Portuguese Prisoners of war kept there by the PAIGC.
1970	27 July	Death of António de Oliveira Salazar.
1973	January	Amílcar Cabral, leader of the PAIGC, is assassinated in Conakry by a disgruntled former associate under influence of the Portuguese Political Police DGS.
1973	24 September	Independence of Guinea-Bissau (Portuguese Guinea) is unilaterally declared.
1973	November	A United Nations' General Assembly vote recognises the Independence of Guinea-Bissau, unprecedented as it denounced illegal Portuguese aggression and occupation and was prior to complete control and Portuguese recognition.
1973		An economic recession starts, in the context of the international 1973–1975 recession.
1974		The Carnation Revolution of 25 April puts an end to five decades of dictatorship.
1974	25 April	The Carnation Revolution puts an end to the authoritarian regime of Estado Novo. Prime-minister Marcello Caetano exiled to Brazil
1975		Independence is granted to all Portuguese colonies in Africa and independence is promised to Portuguese Timor.
1975	11 March	A right-wing coup fails: A turn to the left in the revolution happens and major industries and big properties are nationalised by government
1975	2 August	A meeting takes place in Haga (near Stockholm in Sweden) where the Committee for Friendship and Solidarity with Democracy and Socialism in Portugal is created. This Committee supported democratic trends in Portugal and opposed pro-soviet communist tendencies. In the meeting were present Olof Palme, Harold Wilson, Helmut Schmidt, Bruno Kreisky, Joop den Uyl, Trygve Bratteli, Anker Jørgensen, Yitzhak Rabin, Hans Janitschek, Willy Brandt, James Callaghan, François Mitterrand, Bettino Craxi and Mário Soares.
1975	25 November	A coup removes far-left influence in politics.
1975	7 December	East Timor (Portuguese Timor) is violently annexed by Indonesia.
1976	2 April	A new Constitution is approved. The Constitutional Assembly disestablishes itself.
1976	25 April	The Constitution of 1976 enters into force.
1976	19 November	Jaime Ornelas Camacho becomes the first President of the Regional Government of Madeira.
1977		Portugal requests International Monetary Fund aid for the first time since joining in 1961, in consequence of the 1973–1975 recession.
1980	4 December	Prime minister Francisco Sá Carneiro and the Minister of Defence Amaro da Costa died in the 1980 Camarate plane crash, in strange circumstances.
1983		An economic recession starts in Portugal, within the context of the early 1980s recession. It would last until around 1984.
1984		Carlos Lopes wins the first Olympic gold medal for Portugal in the Los Angeles '84 marathon.
1986	1 January	Portugal becomes a member of the European Economic Community, today's European Union'.
1987	26 March	Portugal and China sign the Sino-Portuguese Joint Declaration establishing the process and conditions of the transfer of Macau from Portuguese rule to the People's Republic of China.
1992		An economic recession starts in Portugal, within the context of the early 1990s recession, which affected most of the Western world. It would last until 1993.
1995	1 October	The 1995 Portuguese legislative election would bring an end to 10 years of Social Democratic Party (PSD) rule by Aníbal Cavaco Silva. After the only two elections in which a party or pre-electoral coalition ever received more than 50% of votes since the Estado Novo, PSD lost with 34.1% of votes to PS' 43.8%.
1998		Lisbon organises the World's Fair Expo '98.
1998	28 June	In the first Portuguese abortion referendum, the proposal to allow the abortion until 10 weeks of pregnancy is rejected by 50.91% of the voters. This is the first referendum in the History of the Portuguese democracy.
1998	8 October	For the very first time, a Portuguese Language author is awarded with the Nobel Prize of Literature: José Saramago.
1998	8 November	in the regionalisation referendum, a proposal to establish, in mainland Portugal, 8 administrative regions and to disestablish the 18 districts, is rejected in the polls: in the first question, the simple institution of the administrative regions is rejected by 60.67% of the voters; in the second question, the proposal to create 8 regions is rejected by 60.62% of the voters. This is the first referendum in the History of Portugal to have more than 1 question.
1999	20 December	Macau, the last overseas Portuguese colony, is returned to China

== 21st century ==
Year	Date	Event
2001	4 March	Hintze Ribeiro Bridge disaster: 59 people die in the collapse of an old bridge on the Douro river. Hours after the accident, Jorge Coelho, Minister of Transportation, resigns.
2002	1 January	Portugal adopts the euro as currency.
2004	12 June – 4 July	2004 European Football Championship is held in Portugal.
2005	31 December	The 2006 Dakar Rally, the longest and, arguably, the hardest off-road rally in the world starts in Lisbon.
2007	11 February	In the second Portuguese abortion referendum, almost 9 years after the first, the proposal to allow the abortion until 10 weeks of pregnancy is now approved by 59.25% of the voters. The law is published in April.
2010	17 May	The law that allows the same-sex marriage is approved by the Portuguese President of the Republic, Aníbal Cavaco Silva.
2010		In 2010, the official infant mortality rate was 2.53 per mil, the lowest ever recorded in Portugal (1.6‰ below the UE-27, 2010 average), placing the country among the top-5 in the European Union in this particular value of Human Development.
2016	10 July	Portugal national football team wins the 2016 UEFA European Football Championship, in Stade de France in Paris, France.
2017	13 May	Salvador Sobral wins the 62nd edition of the Eurovision Song Contest, with the song Amar pelos dois, composed by Luísa Sobral, in Kyiv, Ukraine.
2018	8 – 12 May	Lisbon hosts the 63rd edition of the Eurovision Song Contest, after Portugal's win in the previous year.
2020	March 2	The arrival date of COVID-19 in Portugal.

== Bibliography ==
in English

- Joaquim Antonio de Macedo (1874), "Chronological Résumé of the History of Portugal", Guide to Lisbon and its Environs, London: Simpkin, Marshall & Co.
- George Henry Townsend; Frederick Martin (1877), "Portugal", A Manual of Dates (5th ed.), London: Frederick Warne & Co., hdl:2027/uc2.ark:/13960/t9m32q949
- Louis Heilprin (1885). "Portugal". Historical Reference Book...Chronological Dictionary of Universal History. New York: D. Appleton and Company. hdl:2027/wu.89097349187 – via HathiTrust.
- Henry Smith Williams, ed. (1908). "Brief Résumé of Portuguese History". Spain, Portugal. Historians' History of the World. Vol. 10. London: Hooper & Jackson. hdl:2027/njp.32101063964850.
- Benjamin Vincent (1910), "Portugal", Haydn's Dictionary of Dates (25th ed.), London: Ward, Lock & Co. – via Internet Archive
- "Portugal". Political Chronology of Europe. Europa Publications. 2003. pp. 192–196. ISBN 978-1-135-35687-3.
- Douglas L. Wheeler; Walter C. Opello Jr. (2010). "Chronology". Historical Dictionary of Portugal (3rd ed.). Scarecrow Press. ISBN 978-0-8108-7075-8.

in Portuguese

- Joaquim Pedro de Oliveira Martins, "Portugal (1097-1861)", Taboas de chronologia e geographia historica (in Portuguese), Lisbon: Antonio Maria Pereira, pp. 290–298, OCLC 804367357. 1885?
- Joel Serrao (1986). Cronologia geral de historia de Portugal (in Portuguese) (5th ed.). Livros Horizonte. OCLC 177327625.
- António Simões Rodrigues, ed. (1996). História de Portugal em datas (in Portuguese). Temas e Debates. ISBN 9727590438.
