= 1834 Portuguese legislative election =

- 13 and 27 July 1834

All 143 seats in the Chamber of Deputies 72 seats needed for a majority
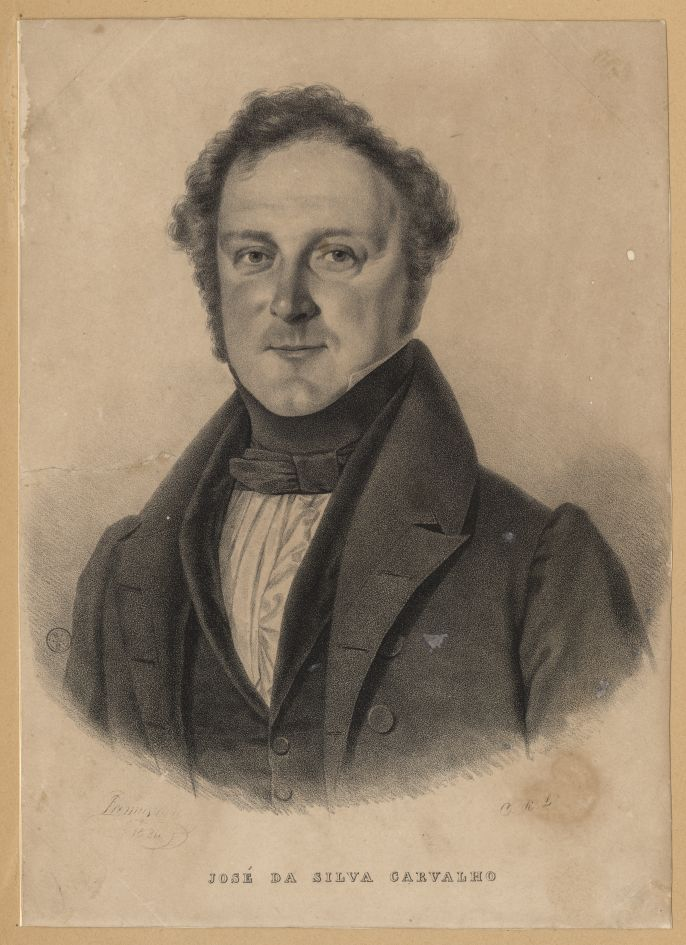

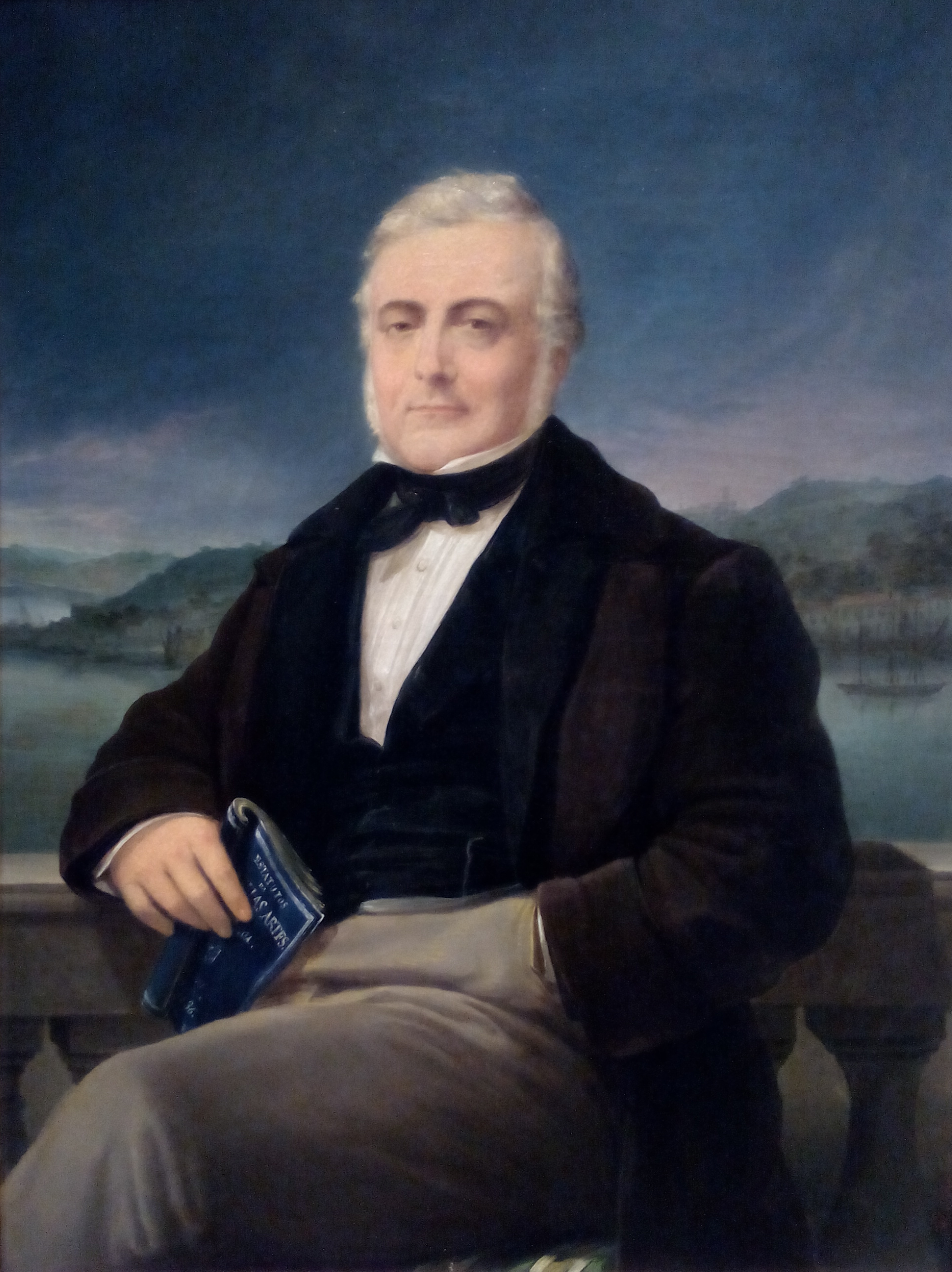
	First party	Second party
Leader	José da Silva Carvalho	Passos Manuel
Party	Cartista	Opposition
Last election	New	New
Seats won	43	32
Seat change	New	New
Elected Prime Minister
1st Duke of Palmela
Chartist

Parliamentary elections were held in Portugal on 13 and 27 July 1834.

== Electoral system ==
Following the victory of the Liberals in the Liberal Wars and the accession of Maria II to the throne, the Constitutional Charter of 1826 was reinstated, having been suspended prior to the 1828 elections. The 1834 elections were held under the same system used for the 1826 elections, with the Electoral Law of 7 August 1826 (annulled by Dom Miguel in 1828) also reinstated.

The Charter provided for a bicameral parliament, the Cortes Gerais, with an elected Chamber of Deputies and a Chamber of Most Worthy Peers whose members were appointed by the monarch or were members of the nobility. The number of Deputies increased from 138 in 1826 to 143.

The 1826 electoral law provided for an indirect electoral system, in which voters elected provincial assemblies, who in turn elected members of the Chamber of Deputies. Voting and candidature were restricted to those who met income requirements. There were eleven constituencies for the mainland and islands.

== Campaign ==
The campaign was marred by intimidation and personal insults. The press was censored and bribery and violence were used to support government candidates.

The opposition Vintistas were unable to campaign in the press, but distributed leaflets, even attempting to gain support from supporters of the deposed Miguel.

== Results ==
The result was a victory for the Cartistas led by José da Silva Carvalho and Agostinho Freire.

Of the 143 seats, only 119 were filled, with 43 deputies supporting the government, 32 opposing it (led by Manuel da Silva Passos and Saldanha) and 44 independents. The opposition had won a majority of seats in Porto.

Party	Seats
Cartistas	43
Opposition	32
Independents	44
Vacant	24
Total	143
Source: ISCSP

== Aftermath ==
The new Cortes Gerais met for the first time on 15 August.
