= 1828 Portuguese legislative election =

← 1826	May 1828	1834 →

All 138 seats in the Chamber of Deputies 70 seats needed for a majority

Parliamentary elections were held in Portugal in May 1828.

== Background ==
After Dom Miguel returned to the country in February, the electoral law of 7 August 1826 was annulled by a decree by Miguel on 3 March. The Constitutional Charter of 1826 was suspended, and the Cortes Gerais was subsequently dissolved on 13 March 1828, with the Three Estates was restored. Elections were called to the People's Branch of the Estates and held in May to elect 154 members.

== Aftermath ==
The Three Estates met in Ajuda on 23 May, although delegates from Braga, Guimarães and Viseu were unable to attend due to the nascent civil war.
