= 1820 Portuguese legislative election =

- 10–27 December 1820

All 110 seats in the Constituent Cortes 56 seats needed for a majority

Parliamentary elections were held in Portugal between 10 and 27 December 1820. They followed the Liberal Revolution on 24 August. These were the first parliamentary elections in Portugal. This election aimed to form assemblies in three levels: parochial, provincial, and the Constituent Cortes of 1820.

== Background ==
Portugal was ruled as an absolute monarchy since 1698, the last time Portugal had any sort of representative assembly prior to 1820. The Liberal Revolution had as its main political objective the creation of a democratically elected parliament, but there were three approaches to what sort of parliamentary government should be established:

- A slight adaptation of the Spanish Constitution of 1812;
- A revival of the Portuguese Cortes;
- A direct election parliamentary system.

While the latter option initially won, the aftermath of the Martinhada (11 November 1820) would lead to the Spanish Constitution of 1812 option being implemented in the 1820 elections.

== Electoral system ==
The new electoral law was introduced on 22 November and had been directly translated from 1812 Spanish constitution, which had a wide electoral franchise but indirect electoral system. All literate men had the right to vote except monks, servants, and some other groups. Otherwise eligible men in Portuguese colonies were also allowed to vote. In a three-stage process, the electorate directly elected members of parochial assemblies, who then elected provincial assemblies whose members then elected the members of the legislature (i.e., the Constituent Cortes of 1820). There were a total of six provinces in mainland Portugal: Alentejo, Beira, Estremadura, Minho, Trás-os-Montes, and Algarve.

== Results ==
The 110 elected members included 43 jurists and magistrates, 20 academics, 15 members of the church, 11 military personnel, five property owners, three physicians and three tradespeople. The vast majority were members of masonic societies.

== Aftermath ==
This election would form the Constituent Cortes of 1820, which would nominate a new government (the Regência which replaced the provisional government Junta Provisional do Governo Supremo do Reino), create the Portuguese Constitution of 1822 and order John VI of Portugal to return from Brazil to swear the 1822 Constitution. A second legislative election was held in 1822, the only to be held under the Constitution of 1822. The Vilafrancada (27 May 1823) would bring an end to the 1822 Constitution.
