= 1822 Portuguese legislative election =

← 1820	22 November 1822	1826 →

All 154 seats in the Chamber of Deputies 78 seats needed for a majority

Parliamentary elections were held in Portugal on 22 November 1822. The elections were the only vote held under the 1822 constitution, which provided for a unicameral legislature.

== Background ==
The Liberal Revolution of 1820 would lead to the 1820 Portuguese elections and to the Constituent Cortes of 1820. The Constituent Cortes would approve the Portuguese Constitution of 1822, along with alterations to the electoral system that would be implemented in 1822.

== Electoral system ==
Unlike in 1820, when an indirect system was used, members of the new 154-seat legislature were elected directly by secret vote according to the electoral law passed on 11 July 1822; 102 were elected from multi-member constituencies on the mainland with between three and six seats, six were elected from Maderia and the Azores, 39 from Brazil and seven from single-member constituencies representing overseas colonies.

A two-round system was used, with candidates needing to receive at least 50% of the vote in the first round to be elected; in the second round only a plurality was required.

All men over the age of 25 were enfranchised except members of religious orders, servants, vagabonds and those still dependent on their parents. Men who were married, serving in the military, had graduated from university or were part of the secular clergy were allowed to vote if they were aged 20 or over. In comparison with the previous election of 1820, this election would also restrict voting rights to the literate.

Province	Electoral districts	Number of deputies
Minho	Arcos de Valdevez, Barcelos, Braga, Guimarães, Penafiel, Porto	25
Trás-os-Montes	Bragança, Vila Real	9
Beira	Arganil, Aveiro, Castelo Branco, Coimbra, Feira, Guarda, Lamego, Trancoso, Viseu	32
Estremadura	Alenquer, Leiria, Lisboa, Setúbal, Tomar	23
Alentejo	Beja, Évora, Portalegre	9
Algarve	Faro	4
Outside of mainland Portugal
Adjacent Islands	Madeira (3) and Açores (3)	6
Brazil	Alagoas, Bahia, Ceará, Espírito Santo, Goiás, Maranhão, Pará, Paraíba, Pernambuco, Piauí, Rio de Janeiro, Rio Negro, Santa Catarina, São Paulo	39
Colonies	Angola (1), Cabo Verde (2), São Tomé e Príncipe (1), Moçambique (1), Goa (1), Macau, Timor e Solor (1)	7

== Aftermath ==
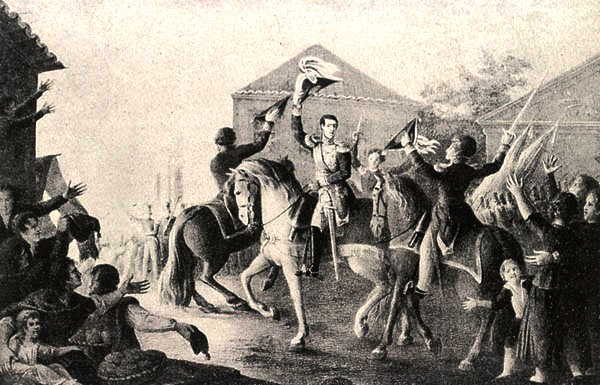
Prince Miguel during the events of Vilafrancada

The Vilafrancada (27 May 1823) would mark the beginning of the end of the 1822 constitution and a return to absolutism. The parliament held its last session on 2 June 1823, when it approved a declaration against any change to the 1822 constitution. Two days later, John VI of Portugal signs a letter declaring that the constitution needs reform and later summons the Portuguese Cortes. The Septembrism movement would reinstate the 1822 constitution (12 September 1836 - 4 April 1838).
