= Ibn Marwan al-Jilliqi =

9th-century Al-Andalus Muslim military commander

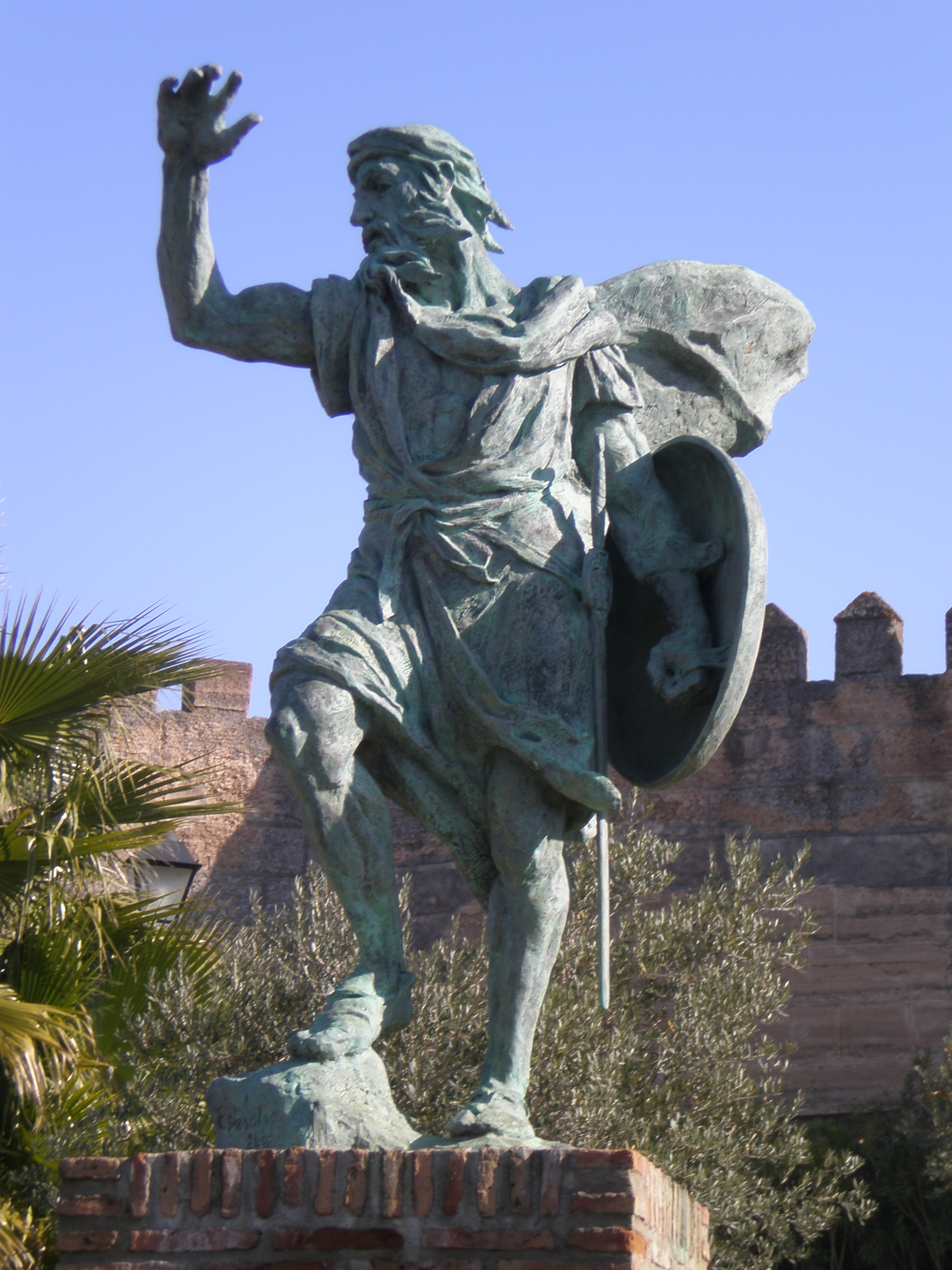
Image of the statue of Ibn Marwan in Badajoz.

‘Abd al-Raḥmān ibn Marwān al-Jillīqī (Arabic: عبد الرحمن بن مروان الجليقي, died c. 889), also known as simply al-Jillīqī (lit. 'the Galician'), was a Muwallad whose family had come from what is now northern Portugal and settled near Mérida.

In 868, leading a host of Muwallads and Mozarabs, he rebelled against Emir Muhammad I of Córdoba and after a heroic resistance he received honourable surrendering terms from the Emir and was granted what would become the town of Badajoz, which he started to fortify.

Anticipating an incoming attack by the Emirate forces, he fled northwards, settling in the castle of Karkar (now Carquere, near Lamego, Portugal). Afterwards, at Ibn Marwân's request, King Alfonso III of León sent him auxiliary troops and the combined army defeated the Emirate forces.

Returning to Badajoz, now a well-fortified city, he established his rule throughout the whole of the Gharb al-Andalus.

Together with his ally Sāʿḍūn al-Ṣurunbāqī, the other important Muwallad rebel leader in Gharb al-Andalus, Ibn Marwân expelled the Banu Dānis from Coimbra. Between 876 and 877 he also erected the Castle of Marvão, in Portugal, a place already known in the 10th century as Amaia de Ibn Maruán or Fortaleza de Amaia. His dynasty lasted until 930.
