= 1826 Portuguese legislative election =

← 1822	8 and 17 October 1826	1828 →

All 138 seats in the Chamber of Deputies 70 seats needed for a majority

Parliamentary elections were held in Portugal on 8 and 17 October 1826.

== Electoral system ==
The 1822 constitution, under which the elections that year were held, had been suspended by King John VI in 1823. In 1826 John promulgated a Constitutional Charter, which provided for a bicameral parliament, the Cortes Gerais, with an elected Chamber of Deputies and a Chamber of Most Worthy Peers whose members were appointed by the monarch or were members of the nobility. The Chamber of Deputies had 138 members; 120 from the mainland, 11 from islands and seven from overseas colonies.

An electoral law was enacted on 7 August 1826, under which members of the Chamber of Deputies were elected from eight multi-member constituencies in which voters had as many votes as there were seats, as well as seven single-member constituencies for the colonial seats. The elections used a four-round system, with candidates required to receive a majority of the vote in the first three rounds to be elected, before the fourth round was held using plurality voting.

The electoral franchise was more restrictive than in 1822, with new income and property requirements on top of the existing age limits, and the elections were held on an indirect basis, with voters electing provincial assemblies, who in turn elected members of the Chamber of Deputies. To vote for the provincial assemblies, the requirement was an income of 100,000 reals, but only those whose income was at least 200,000 could become members of the provincial assemblies. Membership of the Chamber of Deputies was restricted to those with an income of at least 400,000 reals.

== Results ==
The result was a victory for the situationists, although the apostolic opposition boycotted the elections.

== Aftermath ==
The new Cortes Gerais was opened on 30 October 1826. Although it was due to have a four-year term, it was dissolved on 13 March 1828 by Dom Miguel.
