= Constitutional Charter of 1826 =

Second constitution in Portuguese history

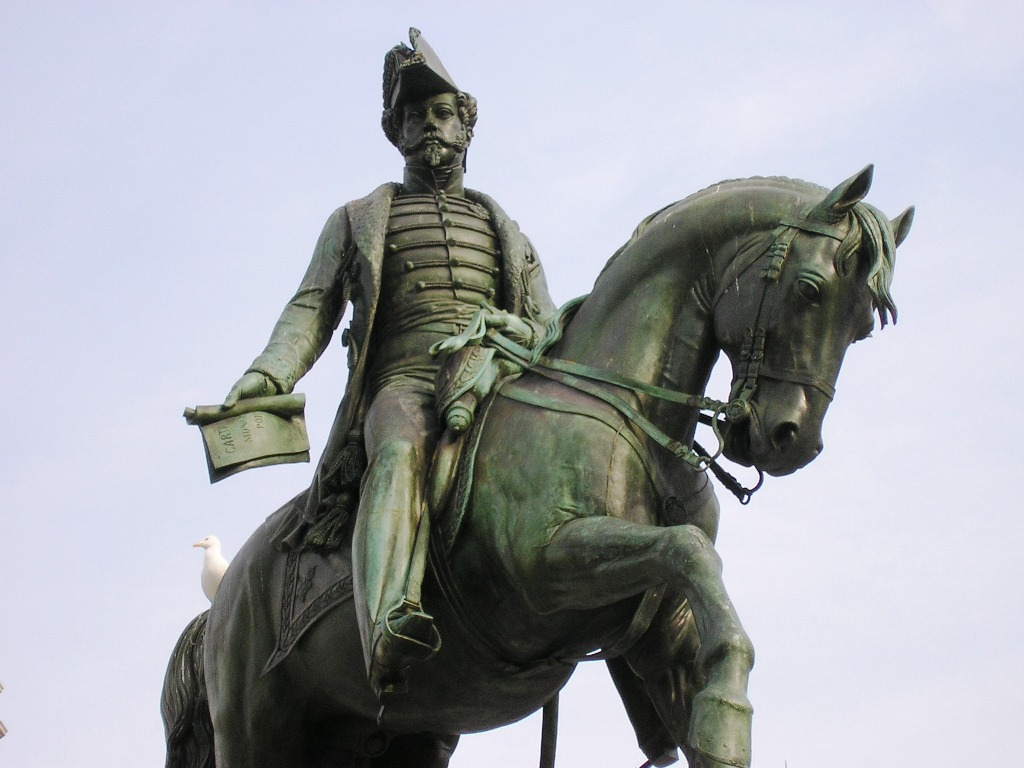
King Pedro IV of Portugal holding the Constitutional Charter. The monument is in Porto.

The Charter of 1826 or Carta Constitucional, often simply referred to as the Carta, was the second constitution in Portuguese history. It was given to the country in 1826 by King Dom Pedro IV. The constitution remained in force, with the exceptions of the periods 1828–1834 and 1838–1842, until the fall of the monarchy in 1910. It was modified in 1852, 1865, 1896, and 1907. The constitution was modelled on the 1824 Brazilian constitution that Pedro imposed on the country, which in turn was modelled on the failed 1822 Portuguese Constitution, which in turn was modelled on the Spanish Constitution of 1812.

In contrast to the first constitution, the Portuguese Constitution of 1822, approved by the constitutional assembly or cortes (see the Liberal Revolution of 1820), the Carta was an imposed constitution issued by the king under his own authority without the involvement of the people.

The Carta provided for a bicameral Parliament. The upper chamber, modeled after the British House of Lords, consisted of hereditary peers; the chamber of representatives was partially elected and partially appointed by the king. The Carta was far more conservative than the Constitution of 1822, because the king also attempted to satisfy advocates of the absolute monarchy. Nonetheless, this faction rejected the Carta, which was set aside when the absolute monarch Dom Miguel I of Portugal seized power, and it was reintroduced only after the victory of the liberals in the Miguelite War.

After the Miguelite War, the liberals throughout the country were divided on the question of whether the Carta should be restored or whether a constitution modeled after that of 1822 should be introduced. Both factions, the Cartistas (advocates of the Carta) and the Setembristas (advocates of a liberal constitution), quarreled bitterly, which ultimately led to civil war. The Carta was restored and set aside repeatedly as one side or the other gained the upper hand. Thus it served as the constitution of Portugal from 1826 to 1828, from 1834 to 1838 and from 1842 until the end of the monarchy in 1910. In 1852 the Carta underwent significant change in the constitutional reform intended to make it acceptable to the Setembristas as well.

== See also ==
- Portuguese Civil Code
- Timeline of Portuguese history
