= Portuguese Constitution of 1822 =

First constitution of the Kingdom of Portugal (1822–1826)

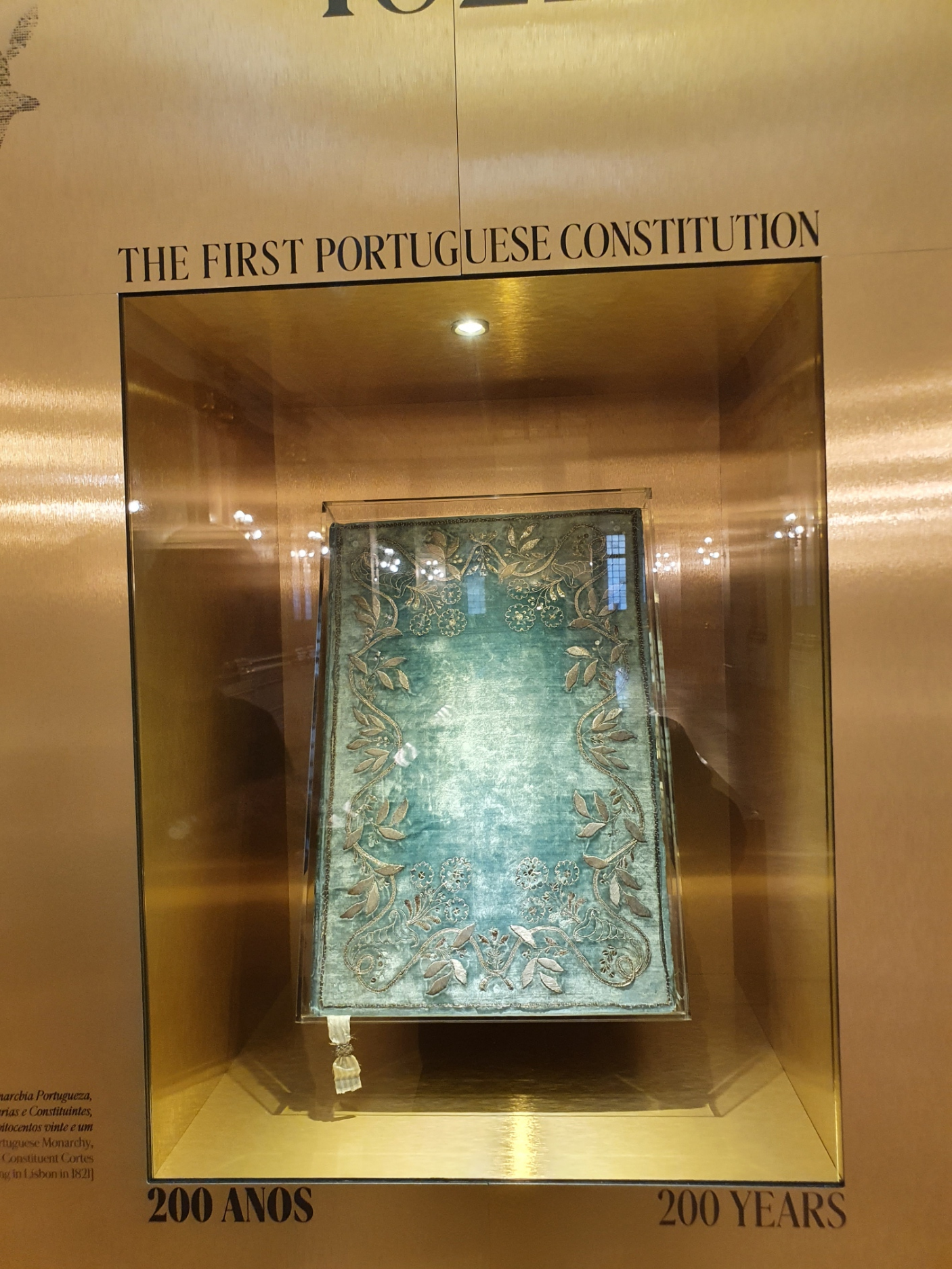
Original copy of the 1822 constitution.

The Portuguese Constitution of 1822 (formally the Political Constitution of the Portuguese Monarchy) (Portuguese: Constituição Política da Monarquia Portuguesa) approved on 23 September 1822 was the first Portuguese constitution, marking an attempt to end absolutism and introduce a constitutional monarchy. Although it was actually in force only for two brief periods, 1822–23 and 1836–38, it was fundamental to the history of democracy in Portugal. It was replaced by the Constitutional Charter of 1826.

== Origins ==
The constitution was the result of the work of the Constituent Cortes of 1820, convened after the Liberal Revolution. The Cortes began its work in January 1821 and concluded after King John VI of Portugal swore allegiance to it in October 1822.

== Key elements ==
Considered as generally progressive for its time, the constitution was largely inspired by the Spanish Constitution of 1812 as well as by the French Constitution of 1791. It was divided into six sections and 240 articles. Among its key principles were:

- enshrining individual rights and duties for all citizens, with human rights such as individual liberty, equality before the law, and property rights guaranteed.
- establishing the nation of all Portuguese people as the basis for national sovereignty, which resided with and was to be exercised by the duly elected Cortes.
- defining the territory of the nation, the United Kingdom of Portugal, Brazil and the Algarves, constituted by the Kingdom of Portugal, the “Adjacent Islands” of Madeira and the Azores, the Kingdom of Brazil and the territories in Africa and Asia.
- removing the feudal privileges of the Clergy and the Nobility.
- the separation of powers between executive, judiciary and legislature.
- establishing that the Cortes was to be elected by the nation, and that legislative power, through the Cortes, was supreme.
- reducing the powers of the king under a constitutional monarchy
- United monarchy with Brazil
- no religious freedom - the Catholic faith was declared to be the sole religion of the Portuguese nation.

Legislative power resided with the unicameral Cortes, elected by the nation every two years. Executive power was exercised by the king, as head of the government. He could exercise a suspensive veto over decisions of the Cortes, but could not suspend or dissolve the Cortes itself. The constitution provided for a State Council, elected by the Cortes, who could advise the king alongside his ministers. Judicial power was exercised exclusively by the courts.

Article 34 of the constitution granted the vote to all men aged 25 or over who could read and write, who voted directly for representatives in the Cortes (the indirect elections practised until this time were abolished). Women, the illiterate, members of religious orders and servants were not permitted to vote. At this time 80% of Portuguese people could not read, so the franchise was far from ‘universal’.

== Impact ==
The constitutional monarchy established under the constitution faced a number of challenges. It only remained in effect for two short periods. The first from its approval on 23 September 1822 to 3 June 1823, when John VI suspended it during the Vilafrancada uprising and, despite his promise, never reintroduced it. The second was between 10 September 1836 when the September Revolution broke out and 20 March 1838, when a new constitution was approved.

When news of the new constitution reached Brazil, it prompted the country's Declaration of Independence.
