= Carbonero =

Carbonero may refer to:

- Carbonero, another name for the bar jack, a fish
- Carbonero el Mayor, a municipality in the province of Segovia, Castile and León, Spain
- Sara Carbonero (born 1984), Spanish sports journalist

== See also ==
- Carboneros, a city in the province of Jaén, Spain
- Carbonera (disambiguation)
- Carbonara (disambiguation)
- Carbonari, secret revolutionary societies in Italy circa 1800–1831
- Carbonaro (disambiguation)
