= C. carbonaria =

C. carbonaria may refer to:

- Cardiocondyla carbonaria, an ant species in the genus Cardiocondyla
- Cercomacra carbonaria, the Rio Branco antbird, a bird species found in Brazil and Guyana
- Cheilosia carbonaria, a hoverfly species found in Europe
- Crassispira carbonaria, a sea snail species

== See also ==
- Carbonaria (disambiguation)
