= Carbonara (disambiguation) =

Carbonara is an Italian pasta dish.

Carbonara may also refer to:

== Places ==
- Carbonara di Bari, a comune (municipality) in the Italian region Apulia
- Carbonara di Nola, a comune in the Province of Naples in the Italian region Campania
- Carbonara di Po, a comune in the Province of Mantua in the Italian region Lombardy
- Carbonara Scrivia, a comune in the Province of Alessandria in the Italian region Piedmont
- Carbonara al Ticino, a comune in the Province of Pavia in the Italian region Lombardy
- Pizzo Carbonara, the highest peak of the Madonie mountains in Sicily
- San Giovanni a Carbonara, a church in Naples, southern Italy
- Karbunarë, a village in Fier County, Albania
- Karbunarë, Vlorë, a village in Vlorë County, Albania
- Cape Carbonara, a promontory in Sardinia, Italy

== Other uses ==
- Carbonara, a female member of the Carbonari secret society
- "Carbonara", a 1982 song by Spliff
- La Carbonara, an Italian film directed by Luigi Magni

== People with the name ==
- David Carbonara, a film and TV composer and music editor
- Gerard Carbonara (1886–1959), an American composer

== See also ==
- Carbonera (disambiguation)
- Carbonaria (disambiguation)
- Carbonaro (disambiguation)
