= Manuel Buíça =

Portuguese regicide (1875–1908)

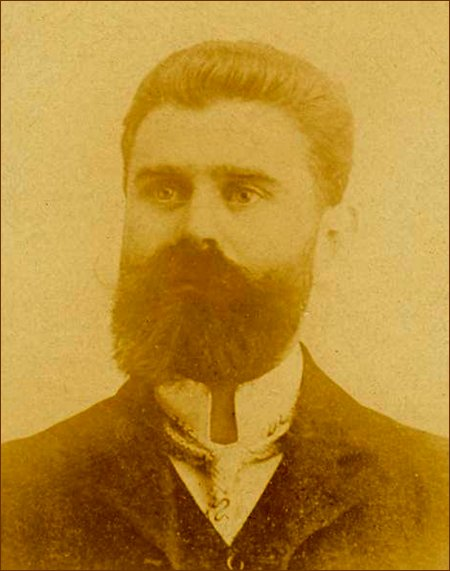
- Born: Manuel dos Reis da Silva Buíça; 31 December 1875; Bouçoães, Valpaços, Portugal
- Died: 1 February 1908 (aged 32); Lisbon, Portugal
- Cause of death: Gunshot wounds
- Occupations: cavalry sergeant; teacher
- Spouse: Hermínia Augusta da Costa
- Parents: Abílio da Silva Buíça; Maria Barroso

Details
- Date: 1 February 1908
- Location: Terreiro do Paço
- Targets: King Carlos I of Portugal; Queen Amélie d'Orléans; Prince Luis Filipe; Prince Manuel II; Prime Minister João Franco
- Killed: 2
- Injured: 1
- Weapon: Winchester Model 1907

Manuel dos Reis da Silva Buíça (31 December 1875 – 1 February 1908) was a Portuguese schoolteacher and soldier involved in the regicide of King Carlos I of Portugal and Prince Royal, Luís Filipe, during the events that became known as the Lisbon Regicide.

== Biography ==
Manuel Buíça was born on 31 December 1875. He was son of Abílio da Silva Buíça, parish priest of Vinhais, and Maria Barroso. Buíça married twice: the first lasted from 1896 to 1898, and his second, to Hermínia Augusta da Costa, with whom he had two children (Elvira and Manuel).

Manuel Buíça had few friends, outside his professional acquaintances, although he was a close colleague of Alfredo Luís da Costa and Aquilino Ribeiro (the latter of whom he referred to in his last testament by name), with whom he mingled at the Café Gelo in the Rossio.

His professional career started with his conscription into the army, where he would achieve the status of second Sergeant, and hold the title of field instructor in shooting, while at the Cavalry Regiment in Bragança. A professional, Buíça also enrolled in the master-at-arms training course, obtaining a medal for first class sharpshooting medallion in the process. His career in the military was not spotless: there were various infractions and three disciplinary notes in his record.

After the army, Buíça enrolled in courses at the Colégio Nacional, and participated in lessons in music and French.

=== Elevator coup ===
On the night of 28 January 1908 several men were arrested by the police around the Lisbon Municipal Library Elevator. (Note: The Library Elevator, which no longer exists, was a pedestrian elevator similar to the Elevator in Santa Justa used to transport people vertically from the Praça do Município (then referred to as the Largo do Pelourinho) and the Largo da Biblioteca in Lisbon.) This group of people were later determined to be the principal revolutionaries in an attempted republican coup that was to have effectively occurred on January 28, 1908, but failed. The Janeirada (which colloquially means the January thing), or more commonly referred to as the Municipal Library Elevator Coup, was an attempted coup to assassinate João Franco, proclaim a republic, and abolish the monarchy (by this, its King, Carlos I of Portugal).

A cell of 20 men, led by Alfredo Luís da Costa, that also included Manuel Buíça, originally were to assault the Royal Palace, but later, strategically modified their assault to the Quartel dos Lóios, and attacked contingents of the Municipal Guard, around the Rua de Santa Bárbara, until they received word of the revolution (from a particular mortar explosion).

The Janeirada was planned by members of the Portuguese Republican Party, their enforcers, the Formiga Branca, elements of the Progressive Dissidency Party and the Carbonária, the latter two providing financing, men and arms. In addition to António José de Almeida, there was support from the shadows from Luz de Almeida, the chief of the Carbonária Lusitana, Machado Santos and António Maria da Silva. The decision to murder the King, was not clear, but these instructions were passed on to Costa's group, as part of the coup plans. But, the plans were shelved immediately when, tipped-off by police, João Franco's government began rounding-up the usual suspects in militant republican circles. Those that could escape, did so, while others congregated around São Julião's Elevator and were rounded-up by the police en masse. In fact, the limits were limited to the higher-echelon members and leaders of the anti-monarchist movement, while lower level dissidents and thugs were limited to attacks in the Rato, in Alcântara, in the Campo de Santana, and along the Rua da Escola Politécnica (where one officer was killed).

The back room of the Café Gelo, then a popular meeting place for republican and Carbonária sympathizers, was empty in the following days, except for Manuel Buíça and Alfredo Costa who had escaped the sweep and were not afraid to be seen.

=== Assassination ===
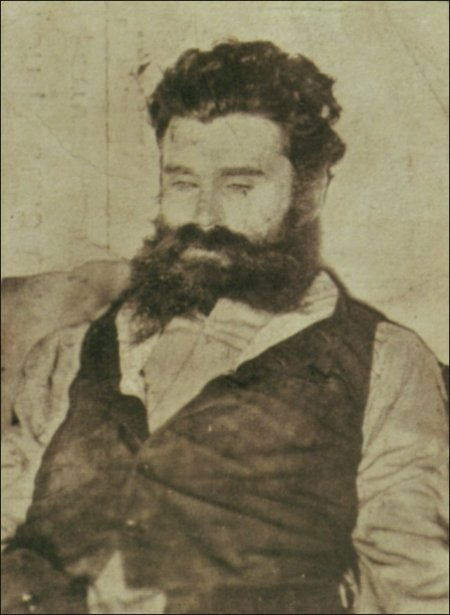
Manuel Buíça on the date of his death, after the assassination of King Carlos I and the Prince Royal, 1 February 1908

On the morning of 1 February 1908, Manuel Buíça met with Alfredo Luís da Costa and other Carbonária in Quinta do Xexé, in Olivais, where they finalized the regicide of King Carlos I of Portugal. (Note: From the version recounted by Fabricio de Lemos, one of the assassins, to António de Albuquerque in A execução do Rei Carlos, although most of the plan was decided, the meeting was used to finalize and adjust their details. This was particularly important since many of the higher-ranking members of the conspiracy had been arrested during the post-Elevator Coup round-up.) Around two in the afternoon, Buíça had lunch with Costa and three other conspirators in the corner of the Café Gelo. Near the kitchen, the nook allowed members to converse unnoticed. At the end of their conversations, Buíça got up, mentioning that he was going to "get the wand", which likely referred to his Winchester 1907 semi-automatic carbine (serial 2137), which had been exported from Germany by Heitor Ferreira.

By four in the afternoon, Buíça, Domingos Ribeiro, and José Maria Nunes positioned themselves in the Terreiro do Paço, near the statute of King Joseph I and near a tree in front of the Ministry of the Kingdom, alongside a kiosk. Costa, de Lemos, and Ximenes assumed positions below the arcade of the Ministry, and mingled with the population gathered for the king's arrival by boat.

At about 17:20, as the landau rounded the square, Buíça advanced from his position, and from 8–10 metres behind the carriage, he dropped to one knee and fired the first shot. His aim was perfect: the bullet hit Carlos I in the neck, immediately snapping his spine and effectively killing him. His second shot only guaranteed the king's death, but may have been directed to the young Prince Royal seated in front of the King. This second shot clipped the epaulette on the left shoulder of the King, and caused the king to slump to the right. At this time Alfredo Costa jumped on the landau and firing two shots into the back of the king. Buíça moved in and fired at Luís Filipe as the latter was confronting Costa; the first bullet missed, but the second hit him in the face, exiting the cranium.

Buiça however, was not finished, and attempted to move position for another volley, when he was interrupted by Henrique da Silva Valente, a soldier of the 12th Infantry, who was in the square. By then a cavalry officer, Lieutenant Francisco Figueira fired on Buíça, hitting him in the leg. As Buíça attempted to flee, Figueira immobilized him with a shot to the thigh. A police officer finally killed Buíça in the square.

=== Afterward ===
Manuel Buíça was buried on 11 February 1908; three men, members of the Associação do Registo Civil (English: Association of the Civil Registry) had protested outside the morgue, in order to convince the director to allow them to have a civil funeral.

Earlier that day, the autopsy found: a contusion at the top of the cranium, a laceration in his lower back (likely caused by Lieutenant Figueiro's sabre) and a wound to the left breast. This wound was the fatal entry, the bullet clipped the heart and perforated the liver. The recovered bullet was a 6.35 caliber bullet from an automatic pistol, a weapon that was not used by the Portuguese police at the time, fueling speculation that some para-military personnel had killed him.

In the afternoon, his body, along with that of Alfredo Luís da Costa and an innocent bystander (João Sabino da Costa), was taken to the Alto de São João Cemetery. The two assassins' bodies were buried in graves 6044 and 6045, but in 1914, they were exhumed and placed in the local mausoleum. Shortly after their burial, permission was given by the acclamation government of Ferreira do Amaral to allow republican sympathizers to visit the graves. These events were organized by the Associação do Registo Civil, which furnished flowers and paid (500 réis per person and 200 réis per child) for those that appeared at the graves. After the 5 October Revolution ushered in a republican government, the Associação do Registo Civil acquired a plot in the cemetery and erected a monument to "the heroic liberators of the Fatherland". The monument was eventually dismantled during the Estado Novo, but its elements were never destroyed, but preserved and never replaced.

Around six months before the regicide of King Carlos I and Prince Luís Filipe, Manuel Buíça had become a widower, and his children, ages seven and four years, would be left with their maternal grandmother.

There is a belief, primarily in republican circles, that Buíça was an idealist, whose assassination of the King and Prince Royal was accomplished as a form of justice and honourable duty for the Fatherland. In his final will, dated 28 January 1908, four days before the Lisbon Regicide, he wrote the following:

"Manuel dos Reis da Silva Buiça, widower, son of Abílio Augusto da Silva Buiça and Maria Barroso, resident of Vinhais, concelho of Vinhais, district of Bragança. I am a native of Bouçoais, concelho of Valpaços, district of Vila Real (Trás-os-Montes), married D. Hermínia Augusta da Silva Buíça, daughter of a retired major in the cavalry and D. Maria de Jesus Costa. The major was João Augusto da Costa, widower. My wife left me two children, that I know: Elvira, who was born on 19 December 1900, in Rua de Santa Marta, bottom floor, and who is not yet baptised nor civilly registered and Manuel who was born on 12 September 1907 in Escadinhas da Mouraria, No. 4, fourth floor and was registered in the administration of the first barrio of Lisbon, on 11 October, in the year above referred. The witnesses were Albano José Correia, married, employed in commerce and Aquilino Ribeiro, single, publicist. Both my children live with me and their maternal grandmother in Escadinhas da Mouraria, No. 4, 4th floor, left. My family lives in Vinhaes, where it is likely my death or disappearance, should that be. My children will remain poor; I have nothing to leave them, except my name and my respect and compassion for those who suffer. I plead that they be educated in the principles of liberty, equality and fraternity...and for whom they remain, through providence, in short, orphans. Lisbon, 28 January 1908. Manuel dos Reis da Silva Buiça. Remember my signature, Rua do Crucifixo, Lisbon.
