= Nasuta =

Nasuta may refer to:

- Nasura (spider), a genus of spiders in the family Pholcidae
- Grzegorz Nasuta (born 1996), Polish chess grandmaster
