= Carbonaria =

Carbonaria may refer to:

- Carbonária, an anti-clerical, revolutionary, conspiratorial society, originally established in Portugal in 1822
- Carbonaria (genus), a spider genus in the family Pholcidae
- Silva Carbonaria, the charcoal forest, the dense old-growth forest of beech and oak that formed a natural boundary during the Late Iron Age through Roman times into the Early Middle Ages across what is now Belgium
- Biston betularia f. carbonaria, the black-bodied peppered moth

== See also ==
- Carbonara (disambiguation)
- Carbonari
- Carbonarium
- Carbonarius
