= Lisbon Regicide =

Murder of the king and crown prince of Portugal in 1908

1908 Lisbon Regicide
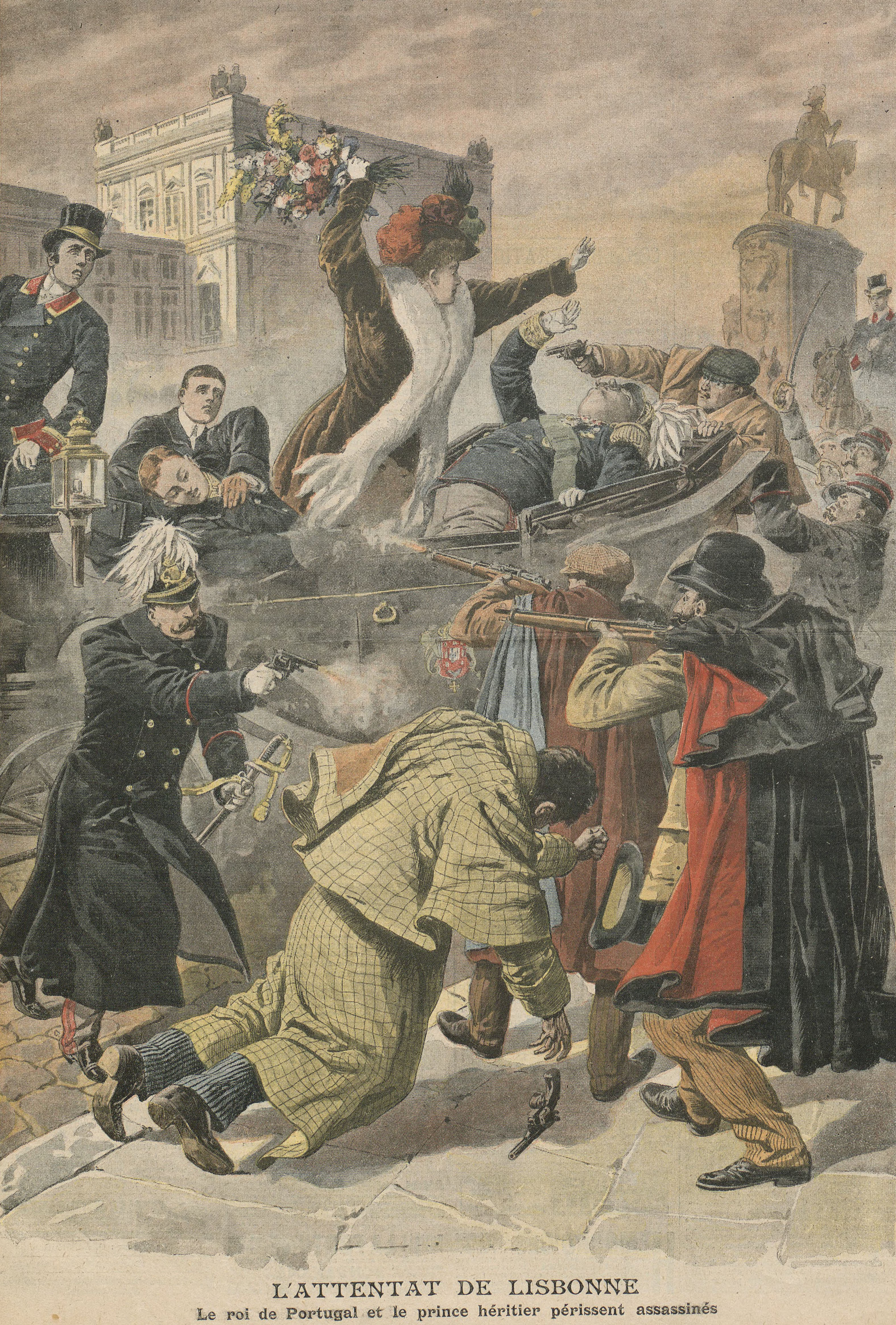
- The Lisbon Regicide as depicted in the French Le Petit Journal, incorrectly showing four assassins rather than two (February 1908)
- Date: 1 February 1908
- Location: Square of Commerce, Lisbon, Portugal; 38°42′29″N 9°8′16″W
- Participants: King D. Carlos I of Portugal; Queen D. Amélie d'Orléans; Prince Royal D. Luís Filipe, Duke of Braganza; Infante D. Manuel, Duke of Beja; Prime Minister João Franco; Alfredo Luís da Costa; Manuel Buíça; Multiple other shooters
- Outcome: Monarchical succession
- Deaths: King D. Carlos I of Portugal; Prince Royal D. Luís Filipe, Duke of Braganza; Alfredo Luís da Costa (perpetrator); Manuel Buíça (perpetrator); João Sabino da Costa
- Injuries: Infante D. Manuel, Duke of Beja; Bento Caparica; Henrique da Silva Valente; Francisco Figueira Freire

The Lisbon Regicide or Regicide of 1908 (Portuguese: Regicídio de 1908) was the assassination of King Carlos I of Portugal and the Algarves and his heir-apparent, Luís Filipe, Prince Royal of Portugal, by assassins sympathetic to Republican interests and aided by elements within the Portuguese Carbonária, disenchanted politicians and anti-monarchists. The events occurred on 1 February 1908 at the Square of Commerce along the banks of the Tagus River in Lisbon, commonly referred to by its antiquated name Terreiro do Paço.

== Motivations ==
=== French Jacobinism and ideology ===
Some idealistic students, politicians and dissidents were inspired by the founding of the French Third Republic in 1870 and hoped that a similar regime could be installed in Portugal. The intellectual style was heavily middle-class and urban, and hardly concealed its cultural mimicry of the French Republic. Most of the Republican leadership were from the same generation; many were the best-educated in the country and were heavily influenced by the French positivist Comte and the socialist Proudhon. The ideology after 1891 was peppered with concepts such as municipal autonomy, political and economic democracy, universal male suffrage, direct elections for legislative assemblies, a national militia instead of a professional army, the secularization of education and separation of church and state (all copied from French revolutionaries).

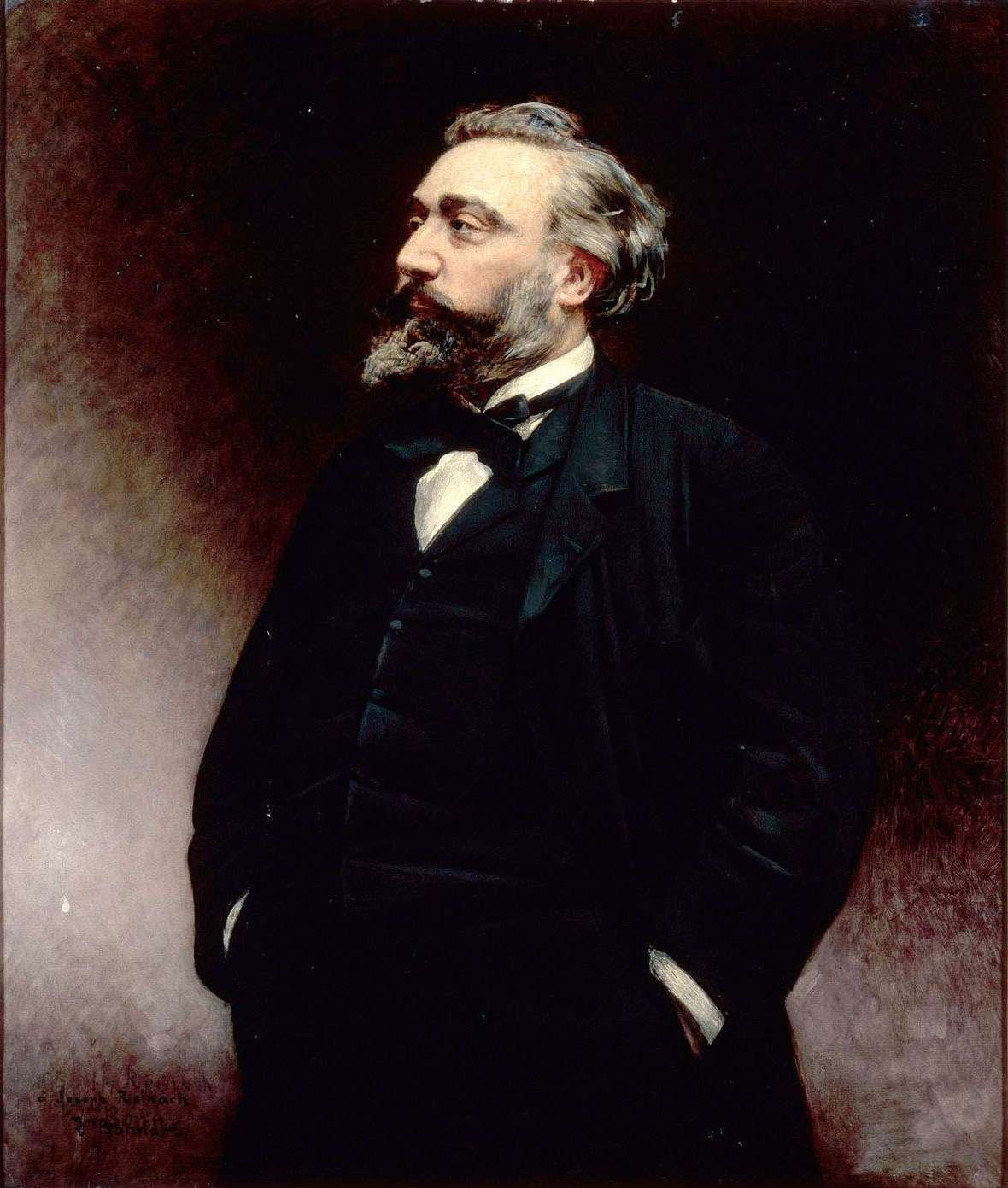
Léon Gambetta, French Moderate Republican who influenced Portuguese republicanism

After the period of monarchist revanchism in France had waned and the daily Sud Express rail service between Lisbon and Paris was established in 1887, the leftist French Jacobin influence grew stronger in Portugal (especially because it counteracted the national humiliation caused by the British ultimatum of 1890). These liberal ideas were encouraged by the French Republic (in 1870) and the Brazilian Republic (in 1889), although the French 1789 Revolution was also considered an inspiration and model.

=== Ultimatum ===
In the second year of the reign of King Carlos I, the Conservative government of Prime Minister Lord Salisbury delivered what is known as the 1890 British Ultimatum: a rejection of the territorial claims defined by the Pink Map of Portuguese Africa. The ultimatum forced the Portuguese to abandon claims to a large area situated between modern-day Angola and Mozambique (encompassing present-day Zambia, Zimbabwe and Malawi) and withdraw their forces from the region.

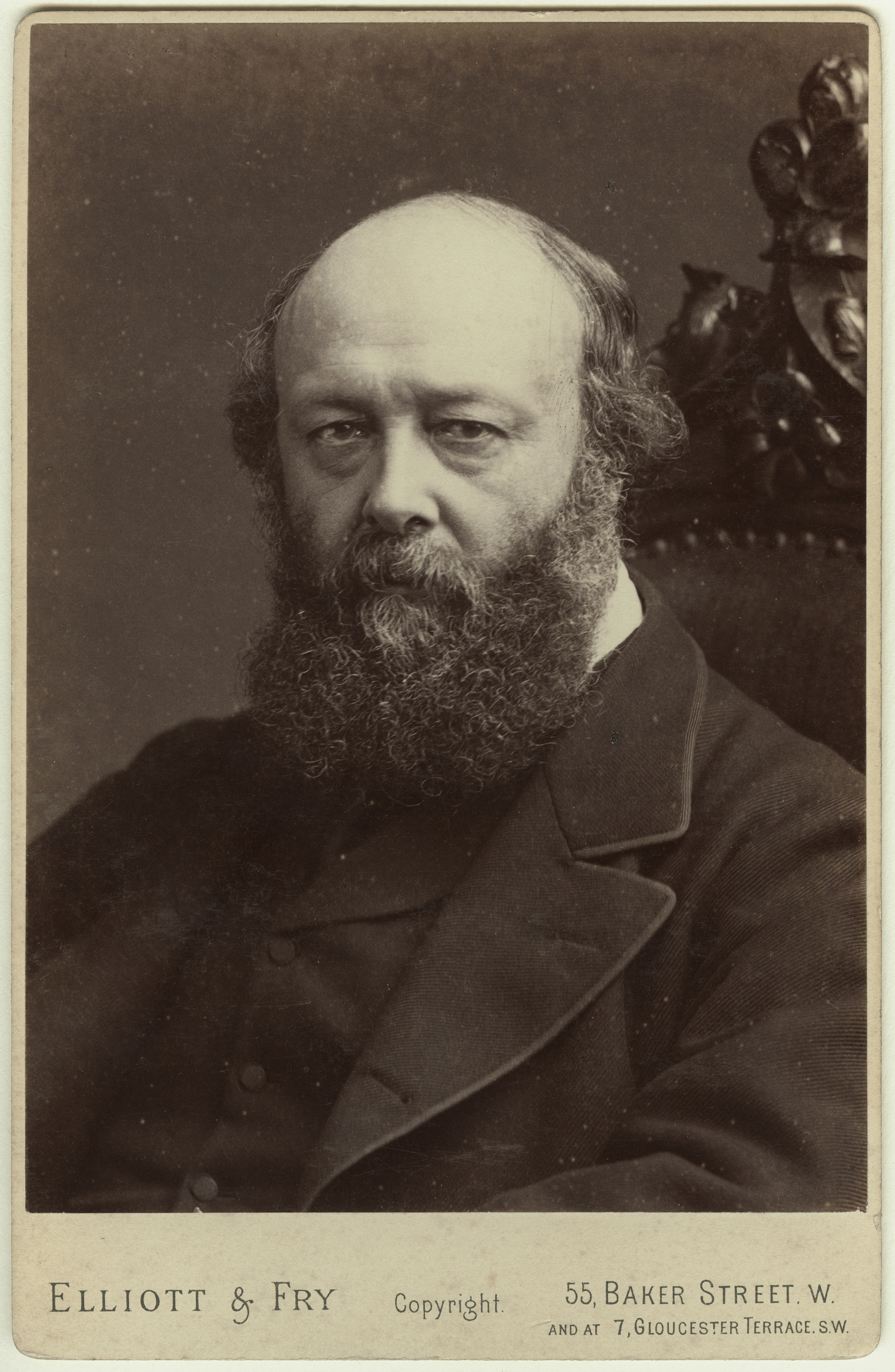
The Marquess of Salisbury, British Prime Minister at the time of the ultimatum

In passionate meetings, street demonstrations, political rallies, in countless poems, articles, pamphlets, even cartoons, Britain was depicted as a treacherous nation of pirates and profit-mongers able to commit the most outrageous and infamous action against her oldest ally. The King, as well as the whole dynasty, on the other hand, were branded as cowards, corrupts, trading the sacredness of the motherland for power and luxury.

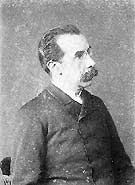
José Luciano de Castro, Portuguese Prime Minister at the time of the ultimatum

The crisis was not a consequence of the King's actions; rather, it arose from the expansionist policies of the government of Portuguese Prime Minister José Luciano de Castro. The Minister of the Navy and Overseas Territories, Henrique de Barros Gomes, conspired with German diplomats to expand the Portuguese Empire and create "a new Brazil in Africa". This was in conflict with British interests, and Portugal was quickly forced to abandon these colonial designs under threat of diplomatic sanctions and military action. King Carlos attempted to mitigate the losses with diplomacy and leveraging blood relations with both British and German royalty; he was moderately successful, but Portuguese Africa was ultimately limited to territory in Angola and Mozambique. The Portuguese people were outraged by the ease in which the Portuguese government capitulated, which they saw as a blow to their pride.

The ultimatum provoked a crisis of authority in the State, which was simultaneously discredited by its diplomatic and military weakness, a failed Republican rising in Oporto in January 1891, a financial crisis, and the end of the previous decade’s understanding between the dynastic parties.

=== Republicanism ===
Since its formation, the Republican Party of Portugal had wished for a regime change. These republicans banded together after 1897, ostensibly to protest against the 1890 ultimatum; their appeals were based upon fears in Portugal of the extent of British influence overseas, a possible invasion by Spain or anger at policies issuing by ruling parties that were widely perceived as being failures. Teachers, journalists, small businessmen, clerks and artisans were drawn to the Republicans, who appealed to nationalism, universal suffrage, separation of church and state and (most notably) the abolition of the monarchy and the privileges of the nobility. As a "party of attraction and assimilation", it included in its membership (and as allies) other groups who were not so idealistic: secret societies, socialists and anarcho-syndicalists, who supported republicanism as a means of achieving change and ending the monarchy. A significant number of Republicans were Masons; some were members of the Portuguese Carbonária, a hard-core activist group which became "a state within the state".

By 1907 there was a strong (and growing) republican presence in the cities of Lisbon and Porto, where the Portuguese Republican Party had already won local elections and intended to promote a republican government at the national level. In the 1906 elections the party only received 2.7 percent of the vote, equivalent to four seats in the National Assembly. All were in Lisbon (where their supporters were concentrated), although their leader Bernardino Machado declared "we are the majority" to The Times in Paris.

=== Rotatavism ===
Problems within the political system had arisen during the Portuguese Regeneration Era as a consequence of an inefficient system of rotating governments (which saw the Progressive Party and Regenerator Party alternating in government). The British ambassador to Portugal at the time, Francis Hyde Villiers, explained the confusion and inefficiency of the Cortes (Parliament):

Sittings of the Cortes...were spent in idle vociferation, and were often suspended for months together; the finances were carelessly if not corruptly conducted, annual deficits were accepted as inevitable, a considerable expenditure being always devoted to allowances granted, although not authorized by parliament, to supplement wholly inadequate salaries, taxation was unequal, and too often evaded by the wealthy, the administration of justice was notoriously imperfect, commercial policy consisted only in the imposition of the highest possible duties, no attention was paid to the promotion of agriculture or the development of natural resources, to education, to the housing of the poor, to the protection of labor, or to any of those social questions which directly affect the people.

The transfer of government was an undemocratic process decided between the leaders, rubber-stamped by the monarch and legalized in rigged elections. Other sectors of the nation were also corrupted by serious economic and social issues: the judiciary was corrupt, illiteracy was between 70 and 80 percent and the nation's finances were crippled by high taxation, monopolies on tobacco and other commodities, numerous sinecures and high customs duties on imported goods.

This system was aggravated at the beginning of the 20th century by new groups which formed from dissident political factions within the two main parties. In 1901 João Franco, supported by 25 deputies, abandoned the Regenerator Party to form the Liberal Regenerator Party with a radical programme of social and economic policies within the framework of the constitutional monarchy. In 1905 the Dissidência Progressista (Progressive Dissidence) was formed by José Maria de Alpoim, who also split from the Progressive Party with six other deputies. The intense rivalry between the new parties, aggravated by personal animosities, was regularly critiqued by members of the nascent Republican Party. Despite King Carlos's intent to execute meaningful reform, the efforts were largely undermined by monarchist inefficiency, incompetence, factionalism and Republican propaganda.

== Prelude ==
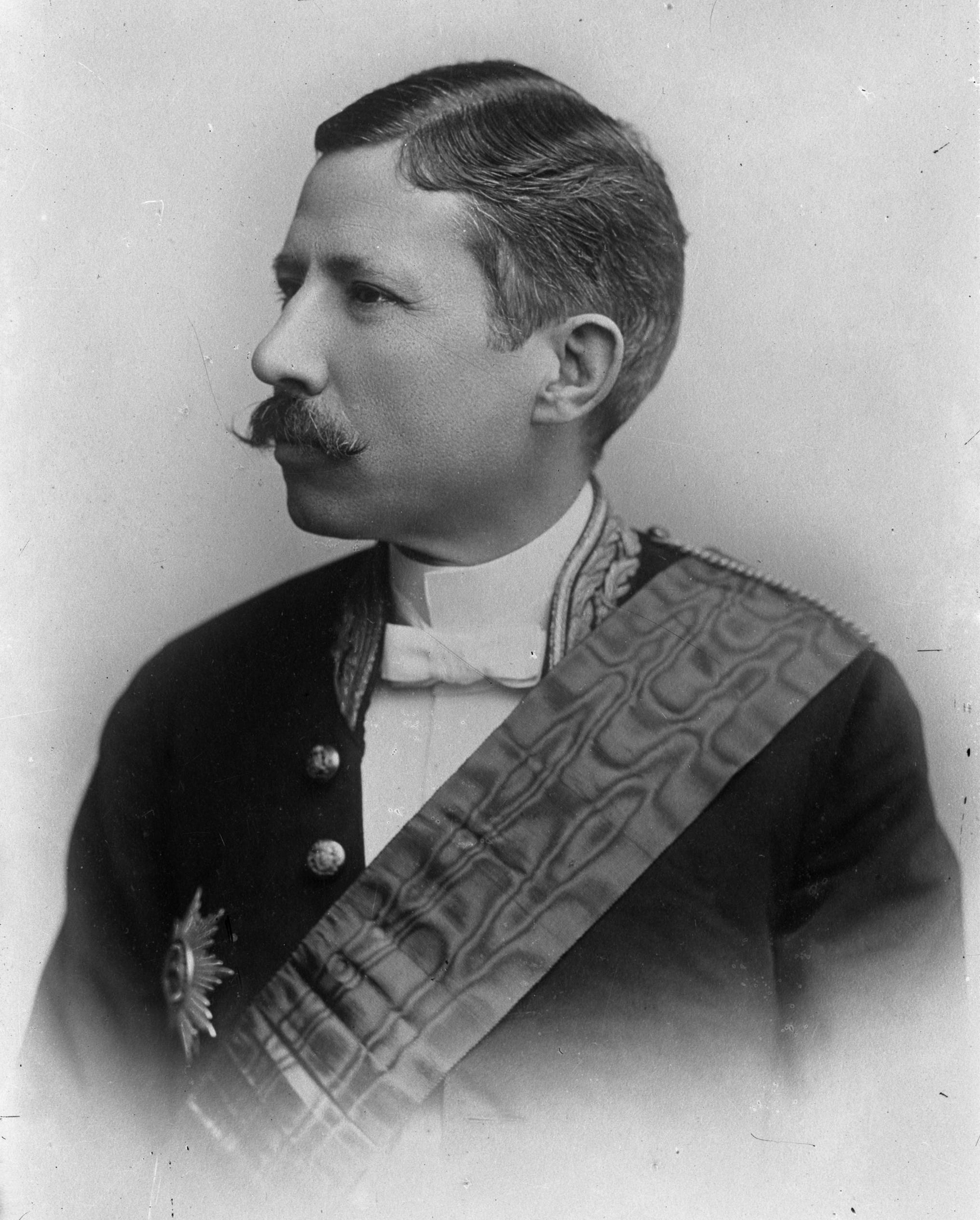
João Franco, Prime Minister and dictator at the time of the assassinations

When King Carlos decided to become politically active, it had become difficult to form a non-coalition cabinet which could win a majority in Parliament. In May 1906 he appointed João Franco premier with a plan to combat the issues of the day, but the opposition was confrontational and progressively less manageable.

Franco tried to govern in a coalition with José Luciano de Castro but this too became unmanageable. Franco asked the king to dissolve the parliament to implement a series of political changes which included censoring the press, jailing reactionaries and establishing reforms to decentralize the government (a program stolen for the most part from the right wing and the republicans). These measures had been advocated by the mainstream parties but the monarch had refused to actively participate, stating that "the king reigns, but does not govern". Ostensibly, João Franco would govern by parliamentary dictatorship until order could be restored. This was the simplest method of government during a crisis and was first used in 1833, when the major parties at the time could not agree on a government. The king had given Franco the means of governing without them; elections would only be held when he and Franco thought it opportune, probably when “normality” had been restored.

However, this measure further increased political tension; the two major monarchist parties, Partido Regenerador and Partido Progressista (who were accustomed to sharing power in an informal rotation), were infuriated. In reaction to King Carlos' action (which favored Franco's faction), they joined forces with the Partido Republicano Português to resist Franco and his cohorts. The political strategy was "Machiavellian", as Brito Camacho (leader of the Partido Unionista) later attested. There were personal attacks on João Franco and the monarch from pro-republican sympathizers, progressive dissidents and academics. At one point, Afonso Costa (a leader in the Republican Party) criticized the government for permitting unauthorized transfers for expenses within the royal household without the Cortes' sanction. Declaring that the sums should be repaid, he then insisted that the King should leave the country or be imprisoned:

For much fewer crimes than the ones committed by King Dom Carlos, the head of Louis XVI rolled off the scaffold in France.

As the session became increasingly confrontational another republican mounted a desk, declaring:

The ship of exile shall convey Dom Carlos away, reviled, harassed and despised...that royal criminal, who has known neither how to honour nor love the country which has tolerated him.

Cortes member Teófilo Braga was forcibly removed for calling the King "a highwayman in mantle and crown". Costa and Braga were suspended for 30 days. Agitation and conflict continued in Lisbon, instigated in many cases by republican youth and their supporters; there were many arrests and the discovery of stockpiles of arms and bombs. These developments created an increasingly volatile situation. Franco then prohibited all public meetings, imposed stricter controls on press freedom and began to take judicial action against “all cases of offenses against the state”. The king became further embroiled in events when he replaced the elected municipal councils by nominated committees and gave himself the power to nominate an unlimited number of life peers to the upper house.

The republicans held him responsible for many of the problems in the country. Republican journalist João Chagas declared, "[The King governed] against all the Parties and men that served him..."

The king was becoming increasingly vulnerable. By then, members of the Republican Party had already decided to support direct (and indirect) dissident groups such as the Carbonária (organized by elements of Portuguese Freemasonry) to force regime change. On 28 January 1908, several republican leaders were imprisoned in an affair which became known as the Golpe do Elevador da Biblioteca (the Municipal Library Elevator Coup). Police found republican Afonso Costa and the Viscount of Ribeira Brava, both armed, at the Municipal Library elevator with others who had gathered to attempt a coup d'état. They were members of a faction known as the Grupo dos Dezoite (Group of 18), who were responsible for executing João Franco. António José de Almeida, Carbonária leader Luz de Almeida, journalist João Chagas, João Pinto dos Santos, França Borges and Álvaro Poppe were imprisoned with other conspirators. José Maria de Alpoim escaped to Spain. During the events 93 republican sympathizers were detained and their arms confiscated, but the party was only partially dismantled.

In response to these events (in which the monarch faced reactionary elements opposed to policies he believed were fair), his government presented King Carlos with the 30 January 1908 Decree. This law demanded deportation or colonial expulsion, without trial, to individuals convicted of attempting to subvert the public order. At the signing of the document the King declared, "I sign my sentence of death, but you gentlemen want it that way". Ironically, although the decree was signed on 30 January, it was not made public before the 1 February assassination. Preparations for the King's assassination were made in advance, according to evidence obtained at the home of assassin Manuel Buíça on 28 January. At the end of 1907, during a conference at Café Brébant on Boulevard Poissonière in Paris, a group of Portuguese politicians and French revolutionaries had already planned the liquidation of the head of government. On the morning of 1 February in the Quinta do Ché (in the parish of Santa Maria dos Olivais) and the days preceding it, the conspirators confirmed their decision to proceed with the attempt.

== Assassinations ==
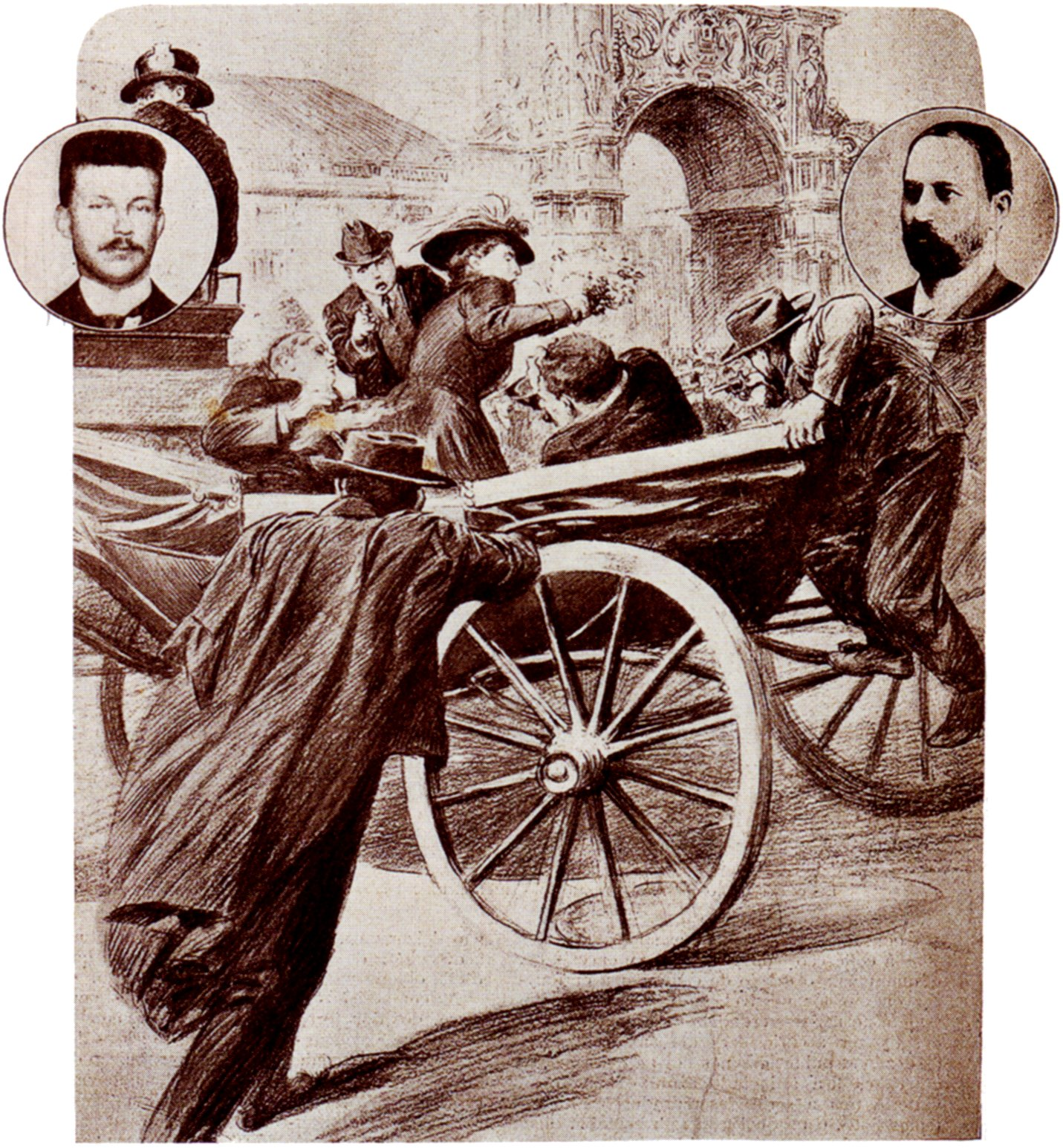
Another depiction of the Lisbon Regicide

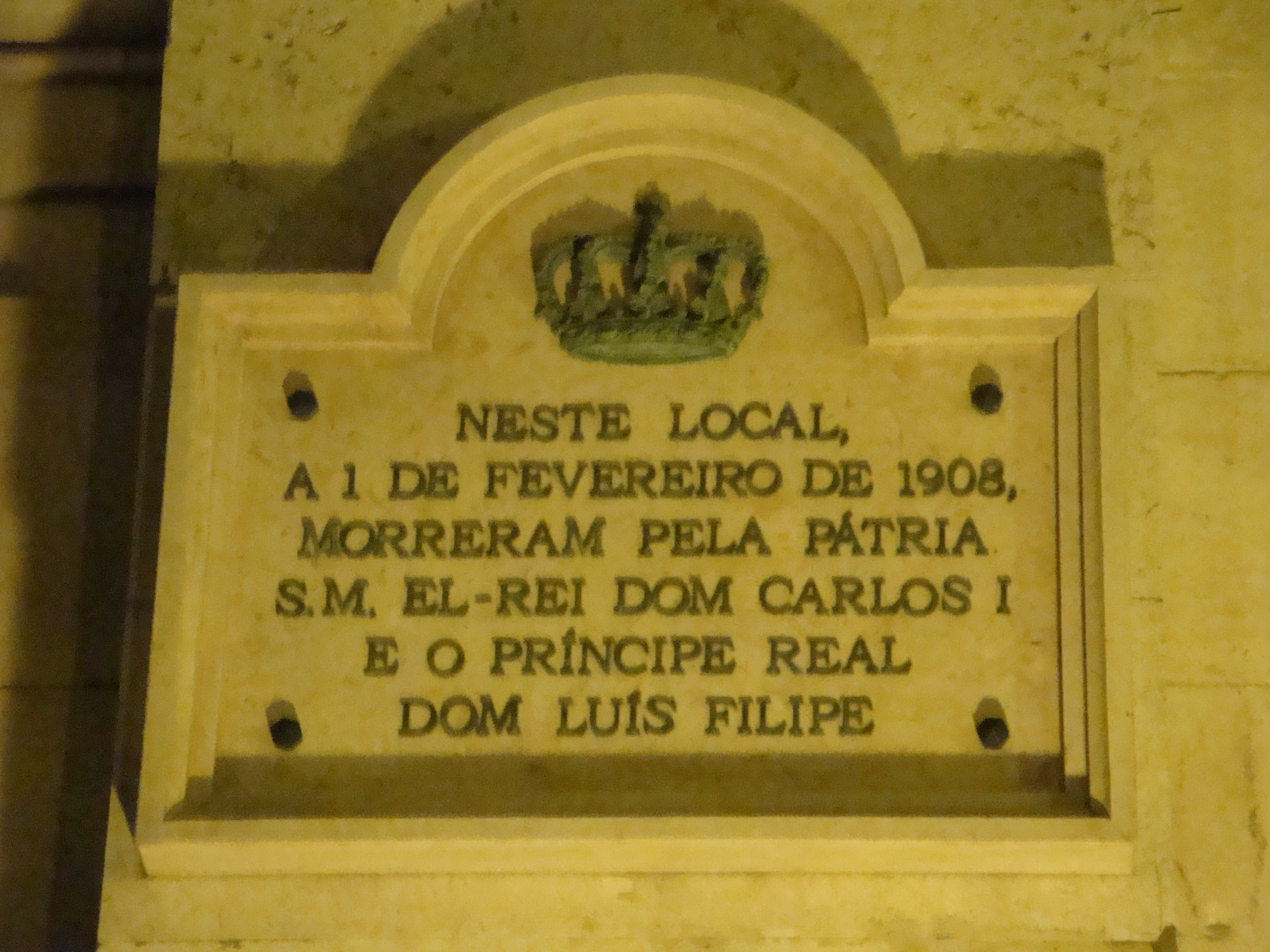
"In this location, on the 1 February of 1908, His Majesty The King Dom Carlos I and the Prince Royal Dom Luís Filipe died for the Fatherland."

The Square of Commerce; at the moment the king was assassinated, the carriage had reached the western extent (on the left) of the square.

The King, Queen and Prince Royal had been on a month-long retreat at the Vila Viçosa in the Alentejo, where they routinely spent time hunting during the winter. The Infante D. Manuel, the youngest son, had returned to Lisbon days earlier to complete his studies. The previous political events had forced King Carlos to cut his retreat short and to return to Lisbon, the royal family catching the train from Vila Viçosa on the morning of 1 February. During their trip the train derailed at the loop near Casa Branca, resulting in an hour's delay. The royal carriage arrived in Barreiro at the end of the afternoon, and the royal family sailed on the D. Luís to the Square of Commerce in the center of Lisbon. On disembarking at the Estação Fluvial Sul e Sueste at about five PM, they were met by members of the government including Prime Minister João Franco, Infante Manuel and the King's brother Infante Afonso, Duke of Porto. Even in a climate of tension the monarch opted to travel in an open carriage, wearing his blue service uniform as Generalíssimo of the Army to present an air of normality. The two princes wore civilian clothes. Although there were a few armed police present in the square the carriage was escorted only by a single mounted cavalry officer, Francisco Figueira Freire.

There were only a few people in the Square of Commerce as the carriage rounded the eastern part of the square and the first shot rang out. As reported later, a bearded man had walked out into the road after the carriage had passed; he removed a Winchester 1907 semiautomatic rifle hidden under his overcoat, knelt on one knee and fired at the King from a distance of about 8 metres (8.7 yd). The shot struck the king's neck, killing him instantly; another gunman in the square opened fire at the carriage while onlookers ran in panic. The first assassin, later identified as Manuel Buíça (a teacher and former sergeant dismissed from the army), continued to fire. His second shot clipped the shoulder of the monarch, who slumped to the right with his back lying to the left side of the carriage. Taking advantage of this, the second assassin (Alfredo Luís da Costa, a clerk and editor), jumped onto the carriage step and fired at the slumped body of the King from passenger height. The queen then stood and attempted to strike back at him with the only available weapon (a bouquet of flowers), shouting, "Infames! Infames!" ("Infamous! Infamous!").

The assassins then turned their attention to the Prince Royal, Luís Filipe, who had stood to draw and fire a hidden revolver but was hit in the chest. The bullet (from a small-caliber revolver) did not exit his sternum nor was it fatal; the prince reportedly fired four quick shots at his attacker, who fell from the carriage step. However, when Luís Filipe stood up he became more visible to the attacker with the rifle; the prince was struck by a large-caliber shot which exited from the top of his skull. The young Infante Manuel, protected by his mother during the events, tried to stop the bleeding with a handkerchief but it was quickly soaked with his brother's blood.

As shots continued across the square, Queen Amélia returned to her feet to call for assistance. The Countess of Figueiró, the Viscount of Asseca and the Marquis of Lavradio jumped onto the carriage to support the Prince Royal. Infante Manuel was hit in the arm, and the coachman was hit in the hand. The assassin Buíça then attempted to fire another round, although it is unclear at whom he was aiming. He was stopped by the intervention of Henrique da Silva Valente, a soldier from the 12th Infantry who had appeared in the square during the commotion. During his brief confrontation with Buíça, Silva Valente was shot in the leg, but was able to distract the assassin. The cavalry officer (Francisco Figueira) remounted his horse and fired at Costa, who was then seized by police officers. Buíça managed to shoot Figueira in the leg and attempted to escape but was also captured.

=== Aftermath ===
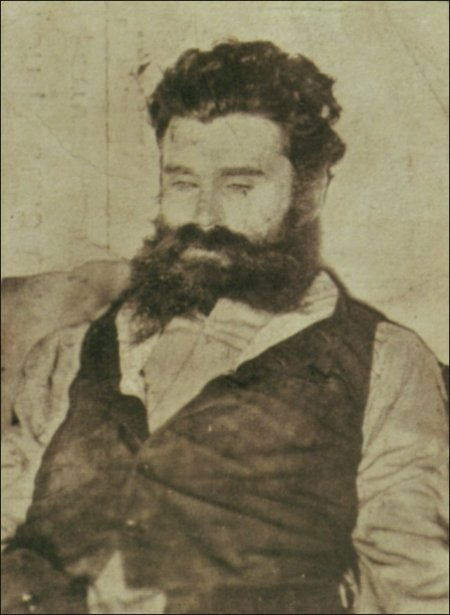
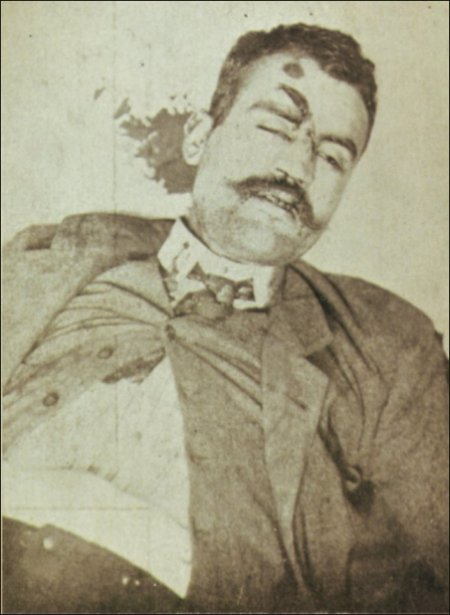
The bodies of regicides Manuel Reis Buíça (left) and Alfredo Luís da Costa (right) were retrieved by the police and displayed at the local police station.

During the ensuing confusion Alfredo Luís da Costa and Manuel Buíça were killed by police, to the detriment of any further investigation. Although wounded, Buíça had reportedly continued to struggle. Their bodies were taken to the nearby police station near the city hall, along with other suspects. João Sabino da Costa, a monarchist worker at a local jewellery store, was mistaken for a third assassin in the crowd and shot twice in the head in the presence of other prisoners.

Coachman Bento Caparica was able to direct the carriage to the nearby Royal Naval Arsenal (Arsenal da Marinha) where the King and the prince royal were officially declared dead in the infirmary; the prince royal died shortly after his arrival. When D. Afonso finally reached the arsenal, he accused Prime Minister João Franco of responsibility for the tragedy. The Queen Mother, Maria Pia of Savoy was called to the Arsenal. She met with Queen Amélia and desolately cried in French "On a tué mon fils!" ("They have killed my son"), to which Queen Amélia replied "Et le mien aussi!" ("And mine too").

Believing that the events were part of another coup d'état, the population of Lisbon locked themselves in their homes and the streets were deserted. However, the troops were confined to barracks and the situation remained calm.

That evening the Queen Mother, the Dowager Queen Mother and new King (Manuel II of Portugal) remained under guard in the Palácio das Necessidades in fear of a further attempt on their lives. In a macabre epilogue, the bodies of the deceased were transported to the Palace in two carriages as if still alive; the head of King Carlos was slumped on the shoulder of his brother Infante D. Afonso, now the new Prince Royal. No autopsies were performed, and the bodies were embalmed under the supervision of royal physician Thomaz de Mello Breyner, a task made more difficult by the nature of their injuries.

== Reaction ==
The kingdoms of Europe were revolted, due to King Carlos' popularity and the manner in which the assassination was planned. Newspapers around the world published pictures (some based on false descriptions and exaggerations) with the defiant Queen Amélia wielding a bouquet of flowers and attempting to strike the assailants with it. In London, the newspapers exhibited photographs of the coffins covered in flowers with the headline, "Lisbon’s shame!" The British king Edward VII (a cousin and a friend of the assassinated king and heir) said, "They murdered two knights of the Order of the Garter in the street like dogs and in their own country no one cares!"

The Illustrated London News published a number of photographs of the funeral procession and accompanying ceremonies, commenting on the apparent indifference of crowds lining the streets.

The new monarch requested the resignation of João Franco's government for not safeguarding the royal family which allowed the "elevator conspiracy" and its unpopular policies. Although the prime minister realized his policies had made him a target, he was never aware that the monarch was also targeted by dissidents. Presiding over the Council of State on the afternoon of 2 February, with his hand on his chest and wearing his military uniform, the young monarch confessed his inexperience and lack of preparation in requesting aid from his loyal ministers.

The young king demanded the resignation of João Franco and the formation of coalition government (later known as the Acclamation Government), presided over by the independent Ferreira do Amaral. The new prime minister included in his cabinet members of the Regenerator and Progressive Parties, formally ending the administrative dictatorship and reverting parliament to normality. Ferreira do Amaral abandoned the positions of the former king; he annulled dictatorial measures, liberated political prisoners, provided amnesty for marines involved in the 1906 revolt and consenting to republican demands. These included permissions for pilgrimages to the tombs of the assassins (which at one point numbered approximately 22,000 people), an event organized by the Associação do Registo Civil (Association of the Civil Registry).

The king was present at the council ministers' meeting which enacted these measures, and which appointed the Marquês de Soveral ambassador to Britain. Close to the royal family, the marquês also voted for the resignation of João Franco's government. Resuming his functions in Britain, however, he saw Edward VII in London who said, "Well, what kind of country is that, in which you kill the King and Prince, and the first thing to do, is ask for the resignation of the Prime Minister? The revolution has triumphed, isn't it true"? Later the Marquês noted, "It was then that I understood the error that we had committed".

Ironically, at his resignation João Franco told the republicans that they alone were responsible for the collapse of the administrative dictatorship. Initially hesitant, the republicans proposed a pact between them and the regime; later, at their national congress in Setúbal (24–25 April 1909) they decided to forcibly seize power. The initial hesitation was due to the party's structure; the Republican Party was a collection of disenfranchised interests, political movements and dissident groups. Some Republicans were sincerely shocked by the regicide, even if it meant regime change. Rural conservatives were afraid of the effects of such actions on their British allies. However, the Republican Party could not turn its back on its supporters: the youth of Lisbon, already indoctrinated by the party's propaganda. Consequently, although the Party dutifully condemned the act publicly its leadership supported its base. Magalhães Lima would later declare to the press in Paris, "I am pleased; yes, very well pleased, for my country, to which a little calm will be restored" (repudiating any responsibility for the assassinations on the Republican Party).

== Investigation ==
An extensive two-year enquiry was held on the events in 1908, initially presided over by judge Alves Ferreira and later by José da Silva Monteiro and Almeida de Azevedo. During this period, evidence was provided to indict members of the Carbonária who were intent on weakening the monarchy. The investigation was concluded on 5 October, and the trial was scheduled to begin on 25 October. In the meantime, new suspects were discovered: Alberto Costa, Aquilino Ribeiro, Virgílio de Sá, Domingos Fernandes and others who were in refuge in Brazil or France; two were killed by the Carbonária to silence them.

The process was in vain; after the proclamation of the Portuguese Republic on 5 October, judges Juiz Almeida and Azevedo delivered their report to José Barbosa (their superior). He in turn sent it to Afonso Costa (Minister of Justice for the Provisional Government), by whom it was lost. It is known that the exiled King Manuel II received a copy of the report from the judges, but these were stolen from his residence during a robbery shortly before his death in 1932.

=== Conspirators and revolutionaries ===
Authors of the period (many Republican) shone light on the responsible actors and their motivations, although many details remain unclear. Raul Brandão spoke to people associated with the events, and extracted a confession from dissident leader José Maria de Alpoim:

Only two people in Portugal know everything, I am the other...Only I and others know in which house the meeting was held, who was presided, and who traded Buíça the revolver for the carbine.

António de Albuquerque (who was exiled to Spain by the royal family following the publication of his defamatory novel O Marquês da Bacalhoa) recounted the testimony of Fabrício de Lemos (one of the other assassins present in the Square of Commerce), which he recounted in his book A Execução do Rei Carlos (The Execution of King Carlos). Aquilino Ribeiro (who did not participate directly but was involved, knew the plan and the assassins) also wrote of the events in Um escritor confessa-se (A Writer Confesses). José Maria Nunes, one of the assassins in the Square of Commerce, also left a description of the events (often autobiographical and self-aggrandizing, but generally credible) in E para quê? (And for what?).

Of these four analyses, only Aquilino referred to the possible ambushing of the royal family and the planned assassination of Prime Minister João Franco. The plan was presumed to have developed at the end of 1907. José Maria de Alpoim cultivated alliances within the Carbonária and planned to acquire arms and assassinate the Prime Minister and (later) the king. These plans (as described by José Maria Nunes) were drawn up at the Hotel Brébant on Boulevard Poissóniere in Paris between two politicians and several French revolutionaries. Maria Nunes did not divulge the politicians' identity, but the French revolutionaries probably belonged to the international anarchist movement (the Portuguese ambassador in Paris had heard of plans to assassinate the royal family from anarchists living in France).

The Portuguese dissidents were the principal financiers, and the Carbonária provided the men. It was also discovered that the weapons used in the assassinations were obtained by Gonçalo Heitor Freire (a republican and Freemason) through the Viscount of Ribeira Brava, one of the main conspirators. The arms used in the Library Elevator Coup plot, originally guarded in the Armazéns Leal, were transported to the viscount's home and hidden. After the plot failed, a group of 18 men met in a mansion in Xabregas on 30 or 31 December, where they plotted to assassinate the royal family. Eight of the eighteen men have been identified; they constituted the first group in the Terreiro do Paço: Alfredo Luís da Costa, Manuel Buíça, José Maria Nunes, Fabrício de Lemos, Ximenes, Joaquim Monteiro, Adelino Marques and Domingos Ribeiro. The second group took up positions in Santos; a third group waited in Alcântara, covering the road up to the Palácio das Necessidades. The attackers did not believe they would survive the attempt: Manuel Buíça had a will drawn up, and Alfredo Luís da Costa paid a debt to a friend. However, the majority of the first group escaped into the crowd and the other groups never intervened in the assassinations.

The plan to kill the king was a major part of the revolt. However, a strange story was later told concerning the derailment of the royal carriage on the return to Lisbon. On the day of the plot, shortly after 4:00 pm and 300 kilometres (190 mi) from the capital in Pìnzio (near Guarda), two servants of José Maria de Alpoim returning to the capital after sending their master into exile in Salamanca ran out of fuel and were forced to stop in the village. In a local tavern, witnessed by several people, the servants affirmed that at that time there was no king in Portugal because he was dead. Since the plot occurred around 5:00 pm, it is unknown how the servants became aware of the events. Their timing would have been correct had the train not derailed earlier in the day. The questions of what level of planning the plot had attained and how involved was dissident José Maria de Alpoim continued to persist; although the two assassins (Buíça and Costa) were blamed for the attacks, the remaining plotters were never forgotten. After the October 5 Revolution, José Maria de Alpoim and the Viscount of Ribeira Brava were unable to participate in the hierarchy of the new regime; Apoim never advanced beyond adjunct to the attorney general, and the former viscount did not survive his term as civil governor of Lisbon (he was a victim of an October 1918 revolt).

Two years after the Lisbon assassination, Jack London wrote the story "The Enemy of All the World" (later included in "The Strength of the Strong"). One of the dramatic events depicted in London's forecast of the later Twentieth Century was the assassination of the young King and Queen of Portugal on their wedding day. London placed this in the 1930s, not realizing that by then the Portuguese Monarchy will have long since been abolished.

== Consequences ==
The assassination of King Carlos and the Prince Royal was the effective end of a constitutional monarchy in Portugal (later confirmed by the 5 October 1910 revolution). The regime functioned for another 33 months with growing agitation and demands for reform (although considerably less than in the future First Republic). It cannot be denied that the weak and permissive attitude in the Government of Acclamation was an incentive for the Republican Party to attempt another coup, coupled with the assassination of the Portuguese King and his son. The assassinations did not change the system of government; instead, they delayed the change.

Many critics of the First Portuguese Republic believe regicide undermined the legitimacy of the regime from its inception and normalised political violence in Portugal, culminating in the assassination of Sidónio Pais in 1918 and the Bloody Night in 1921, followed by collapse in trust in the republican order.

The assassinations remain controversial in Portugal. In 2008, the socialist government of the Portuguese Third Republic refused to participate in ceremonies commemorating the slain victims for the centenary of the regicide, forbidding participation by military personnel or government officials. The head of the House of Braganza, Duarte Pio, Duke of Braganza, led the ceremonies by placing flowers on the site where the assassination had taken place and celebrated a mass in their memory at the Church of São Vicente de Fora (where they are buried). During the centenary year many artistic, cultural, and historic events took place in honor of King Carlos I and the royal family, and several books on the subject were published.

== Centenary ==
To commemorate the centenary of the 1908 regicide:

- A book called "Dossier Regicídio" (Regicide Dossier) was published, explaining and talking about the investigation and responsibility-finding dossier into the 1908 regicide, the results of which are unknown;
- The President of the Republic, Aníbal Cavaco Silva, inaugurated a statue of King Carlos next to and facing the bay of the town of Cascais, symbolizing, in a way, the study and affection that the king had for the sea and nature, and the affection for the town of Cascais;
- Symbolically, Duarte Pio de Bragança and his first-born son, Afonso de Santa Maria de Bragança, both claimants to the defunct Portuguese throne, laid a wreath at the site of the regicide, marked by a plaque. This was followed by a Mass in honor of King Carlos and Prince Luís Filipe de Bragança, in the Monastery of São Vicente de Fora, in Lisbon, where their remains are buried. It was celebrated by the Cardinal Patriarch of Lisbon, José Policarpo;
- RTP produced a series about the regicide called "The Day of the Regicide" to celebrate its centenary.

== See also ==
- Pantheon of the House of Braganza
- House of Braganza-Saxe-Coburg and Gotha

== Sources ==
- Castro Henriques, António Mendo (2008). Dossier regicídio : o processo desaparecido. Lisboa: Tribuna. ISBN 978-972-8799-78-6.
- Fernandes, Paulo Jorge; Filipe Ribeiro de Meneses; Manuel Baiôa (Summer 2003). The Political History of Nineteenth Century Portugal (PDF). Vol. 1. e-JPH. pp. 1–13.
- Duarte, João Ferreira (2000). The Politics of Non-Translation: A Case Study in Anglo-Portuguese Relations (PDF). Vol. 13. TTR: Traduction, Terminologie, Rédaction. pp. 95–112.
- Wheeler, Douglas L. (1978). Republican Portugal: A Political History, 1910–1926. Wisconsin: University of Wisconsin Press.
- Pinto, José Manuel de Castro (2007). D. Carlos (1863–1908) A Vida e o Assassinato de um Rei [D. Carlos (1863–1808): The Life and the Assassination of a King]. Lisbon, Portugal: Plátano Editora. ISBN 978-972-770-563-4.
- Nobre, Eduardo (2006). Amélia, Rainha de Portugal [Amélia, Queen of Portugal]. Lisbon, Portugal: Quimera Editores. ISBN 972-589-165-1.
- Nobre, Eduardo (2004). Duelos & Atentados [Duels and Assassination Attempts]. Lisbon, Portugal: Quimera Editores. ISBN 972-589-129-5.
- Morais, Jorge (2007). Regicídio – A Contagem Decrescente [Regicide: The Written Account]. Lisbon, Portugal: Zéfiro. ISBN 978-972-8958-40-4.
- Villiers, John (2006), "VII – Sir Francis Villiers and the End of the Portuguese Monarchy" (PDF), in Coelho, Teresa Pinto (ed.), The Treaty of Windsor (1386) and 620 years of Anglo-Portuguese relations (PDF), Conference Organised by the Instituto Camões Centre for Portuguese Language, Dorfman Room, St. Peter's College: Instituto Camões Centre for Portuguese Language, pp. 1–18
- Morais, Jorge (2007). Regícido [Regicide] (in Portuguese). Lisbon, Portugal: Zéfiro.
