= Mecolaesthus longissimus =

Scientific classification
- Kingdom: Animalia
- Phylum: Arthropoda
- Subphylum: Chelicerata
- Class: Arachnida
- Order: Araneae
- Infraorder: Araneomorphae
- Family: Pholcidae
- Genus: Mecolaesthus
- Species: M. longissimus

Binomial name
- Mecolaesthus longissimus Simon, 1893

Species of cellar spider

Mecolaesthus longissimus is a species of cellar spider (family Pholcidae) first described by Eugène Louis Simon in 1893. It can be found in Venezuela.

The abdomens of male Mecolaesthus longissimus are, on average, more than twice as long as female abdomens.
