= Luís Filipe, Prince Royal of Portugal =

Eldest son of Carlos I of Portugal (1887–1908)

Luís Filipe
- Prince Royal of Portugal, Duke of Braganza (more...)
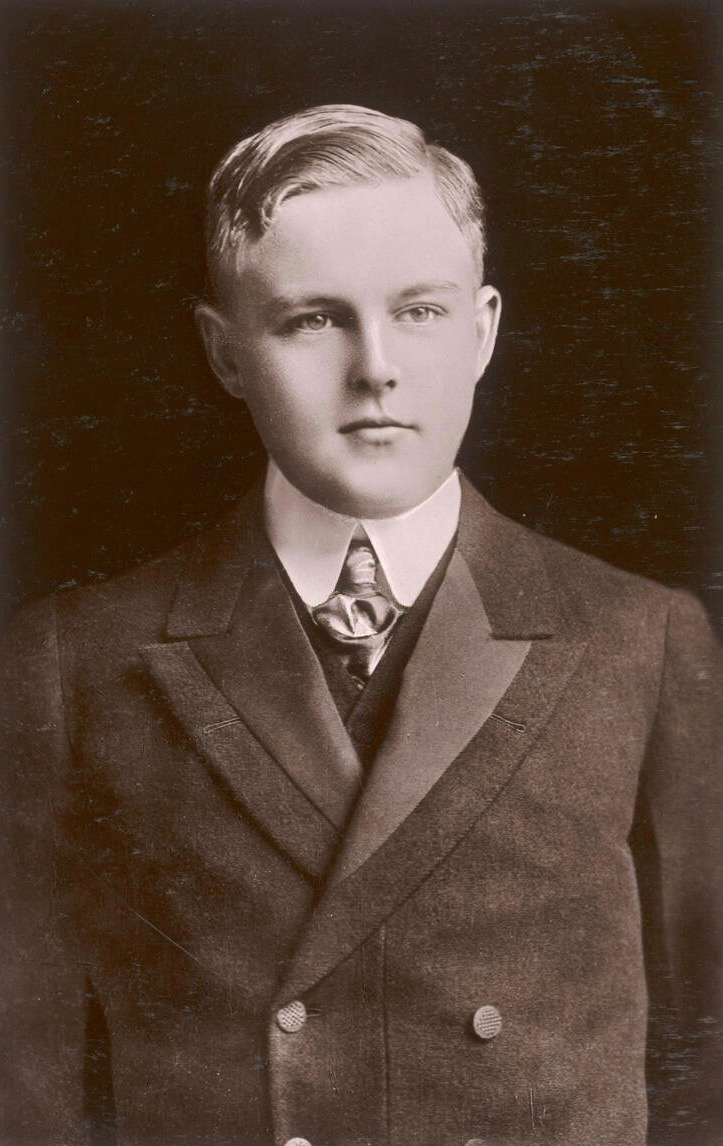
- Photograph c. 1907
- Born: 21 March 1887; Belém Palace, Lisbon, Portugal
- Died: 1 February 1908 (aged 20); Lisbon, Portugal
- Burial: Royal Pantheon of the House of Braganza
- House: Braganza
- Father: Carlos I of Portugal
- Mother: Amélie of Orléans

Dom Luís Filipe, Prince Royal of Portugal, Duke of Braganza (Portuguese pronunciation: [luˈiʃ fiˈlipɨ]; 21 March 1887 – 1 February 1908) was the eldest son and heir apparent of King Carlos I of Portugal until their assassinations. Born in 1887, when his father was still Prince Royal, he was styled Prince of Beira at birth. After his paternal grandfather King Luís I of Portugal died, he became Prince Royal of Portugal and Duke of Braganza as heir apparent to the throne. Following the Lisbon Regicide that saw him and his father killed, his younger brother Manuel II became the last King of Portugal. Some historians suggest he was king as Luís II for a few minutes between his father’s death and his own, though few if any official lists of Portuguese monarchs include him. Portuguese law only acknowledged the reigns of kings who were acclaimed by the parliament.

== Early life ==
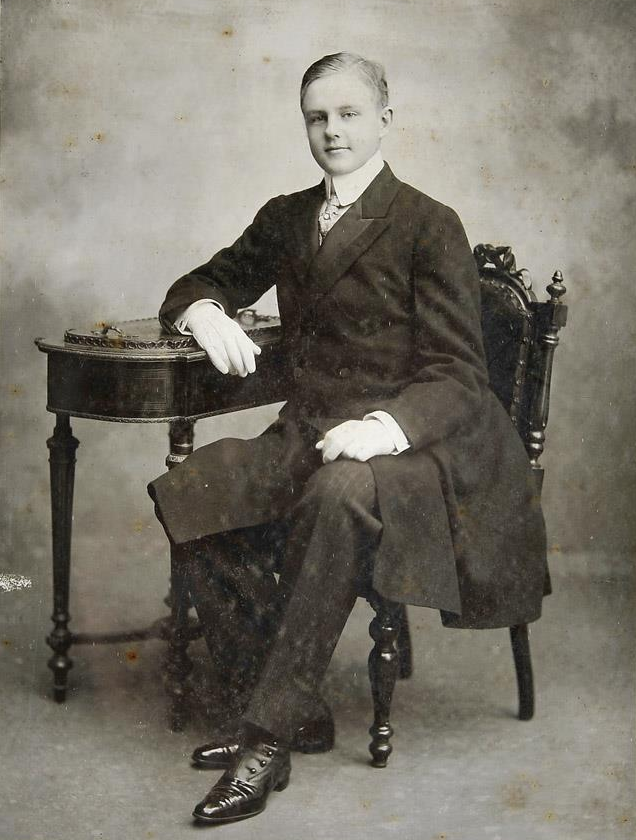
Photograph of Prince Luís Filipe, c. 1900–08

Luís Filipe Maria Carlos Amélio Fernando Víctor Manuel António Lourenço Miguel Rafael Gabriel Gonzaga Xavier Francisco de Assis Bento was born in Lisbon, the elder son of Carlos, Prince Royal of Portugal (later King Carlos I of Portugal), and Princess Amélie d'Orléans, a member of the House of Braganza. He was named for his great-great-grandfather Louis Philippe I, King of the French.

Two years after his birth, Dom Luís Filipe inherited all his father's royal princely titles when his father became king. He was himself re-styled Prince Royal, and at the same time inherited the Dukedom of Braganza (as 21st Duke), which brought with it the largest private fortune in Portugal at that time, completely at the disposal of the heir to the Portuguese crown.

In 1907, the Prince Royal acted as regent of the kingdom while his father was outside the country. The same year he made a very successful official visit to the Portuguese colonies in Africa, the first member of the royal family ever to visit them.

Dom Luís Filipe was the pupil of the African war hero Mouzinho de Albuquerque, and like all the Braganzas, showed many aptitudes in the arts, besides his pursuing a military education. Around the time of Dom Luís Filipe's assassination, negotiations for marriage to his cousin Princess Patricia of Connaught were underway. Princess Patricia was the granddaughter of Queen Victoria of the United Kingdom and Prince Albert of Saxe-Coburg and Gotha, the daughter of British Prince Arthur, Duke of Connaught and Strathearn, and Princess Louise Margaret of Prussia.

== Lisbon Regicide ==
On 1 February 1908, Luís Filipe and his family were returning to Lisbon from Vila Viçosa Palace. Alfredo Luís da Costa and Manuel Buiça, two members of a revolutionary society called the Carbonária, shot at all the royal family, hitting his father King Carlos, Luís Filipe, and his younger brother Infante Manuel, Duke of Beja. Luís Filipe fought back against the attackers, managing to fire four shots at Costa and wound him, before being mortally wounded by Buiça. Carlos I died immediately, while Luís Filipe lived for another twenty minutes. Manuel survived the attack, having only been shot in the arm, while the queen was unharmed.

Manuel succeeded to the throne as Manuel II. Luís Filipe is buried next to his father and forefathers in the Royal Pantheon of the House of Braganza in Lisbon. His younger brother, King Manuel II of Portugal, and his mother, Queen Maria Amélia, are buried opposite.

On 5 October 1910, the monarchy under the reign of his surviving younger brother, Manuel II, was overthrown in a military coup and the First Portuguese Republic was established.

== Honours ==
=== Domestic ===
- Grand Commander of the Three Military Orders of Christ, Aviz and St. James
- Grand Cross of the Royal Military Order of the Tower and Sword
- Grand Cross of the Royal Military Order of Our Lady of Conception of Vila Vicosa

=== Foreign ===
- German Empire: Knight of the Order of the Black Eagle
- Monaco: Grand Cross of the Order of Saint-Charles, 22 July 1904
- Spain:
  - Grand Cross of the Royal and Distinguished Order of Charles III, 1887
  - Knight of the Order of the Golden Fleece, 14 November 1892
- United Kingdom of Great Britain and Ireland: Stranger Knight Companion of the Most Noble Order of the Garter, 15 July 1902
- Empire of Japan: Grand Cordon of the Supreme Order of the Chrysanthemum, 10 June 1904

=== Arms ===
Coat of arms as a Knight of the Garter

Coat of arms as a Knight of the Golden Fleece

Luis Filipe bore as heir to the throne the arms of his father; differenced by a Label of three points Or.

== Ancestry ==
Ancestors of Luís Filipe, Prince Royal of Portugal

8. Fernando II of Portugal
4. Luís I of Portugal
9. Maria II of Portugal
2. Carlos I of Portugal
10. Victor Emmanuel II of Italy
5. Princess Maria Pia of Savoy
11. Archduchess Adelaide of Austria
1. Luís Filipe, Prince Royal of Portugal
12. Prince Ferdinand Philippe, Duke of Orléans
6. Prince Philippe, Count of Paris
13. Duchess Helene of Mecklenburg-Schwerin
3. Princess Amélie of Orléans
14. Prince Antoine, Duke of Montpensier
7. Princess Marie Isabelle of Orléans
15. Infanta Luisa Fernanda of Spain

Luís Filipe, Prince Royal of Portugal House of Braganza Cadet branch of the House of Aviz and House of Saxe-Coburg and Gotha Born: 21 March 1887 Died: 1 February 1908
Portuguese royalty
Preceded by Carlos I of Portugal	Prince Royal of Portugal; 1889–1908	Succeeded by Infante Afonso, Duke of Porto
Preceded by Carlos I of Portugal	Duke of Braganza; 1889–1908	Vacant Title next held by Duarte Nuno, Duke of Braganza
