= Amélie of Orléans =

Queen of Portugal from 1889 to 1908

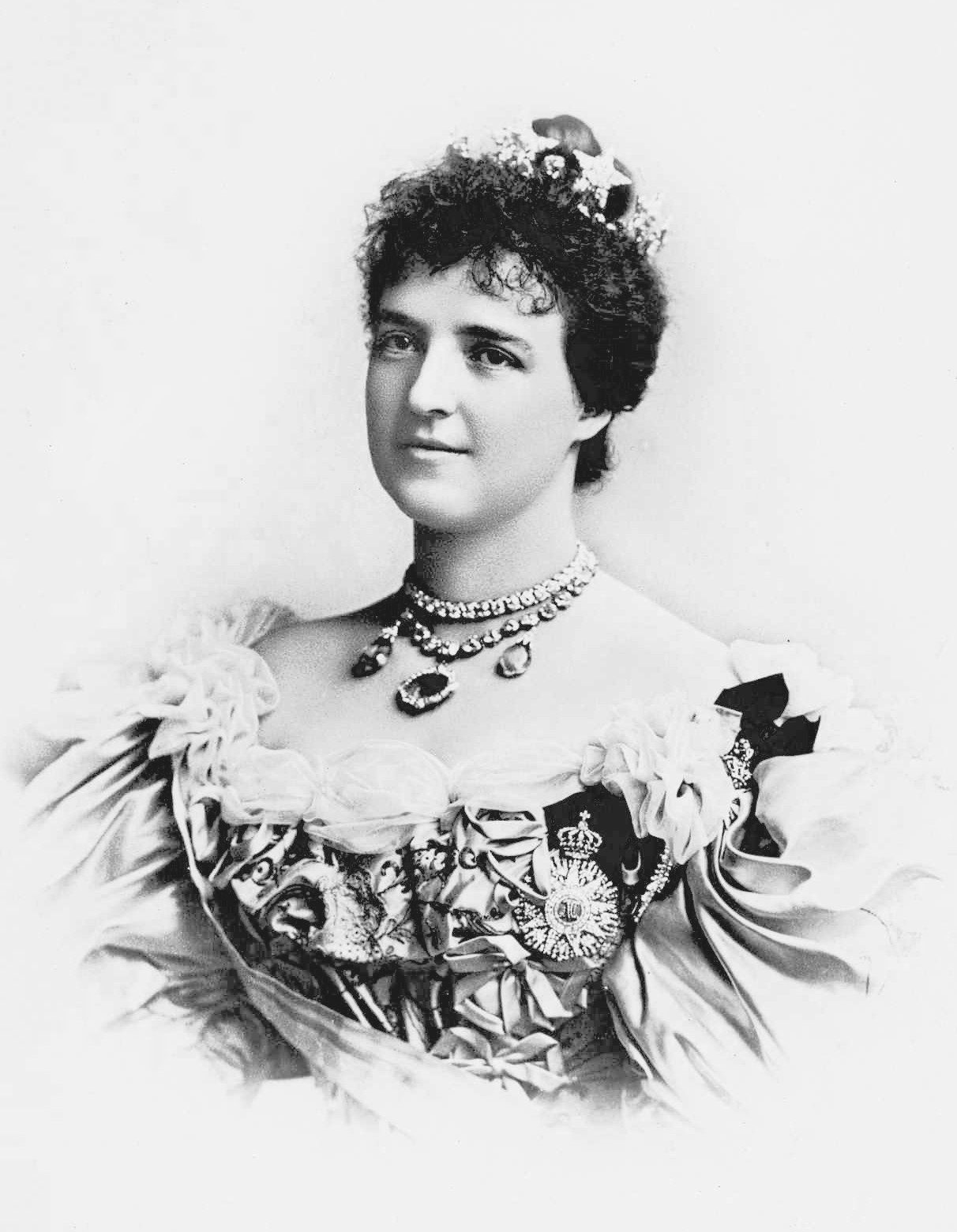
- Unsigned portrait, used on postcards

Queen consort of Portugal
- Tenure: 19 October 1889 – 1 February 1908
- Born: 28 September 1865; Twickenham, London, England
- Died: 25 October 1951 (aged 86); Le Chesnay, Seine-et-Oise, France
- Burial: Pantheon of the Braganzas
- Spouse: Carlos I of Portugal (m. 1886; died 1908)
- Issue Detail: Luís Filipe, Prince Royal; Infanta Maria Ana; Manuel II of Portugal
Names
- Marie Amélie Louise Hélène d'Orléans
- House: Orléans
- Father: Prince Philippe, Count of Paris
- Mother: Princess Marie Isabelle of Orléans

Amélie of Orléans (French: Marie Amélie Louise Hélène; 28 September 1865 – 25 October 1951) was the last Queen of Portugal as the wife of Carlos I of Portugal. She was regent of Portugal during the absence of her husband in 1895.

== Early life ==
She was the eldest daughter of Prince Philippe, Count of Paris, and Princess Marie Isabelle d'Orléans, and a "Princess of Orléans" by birth.

Amélie's paternal grandparents were Prince Ferdinand Philippe, Duke of Orléans, and Duchess Helena of Mecklenburg-Schwerin. Her maternal grandparents were Prince Antoine, Duke of Montpensier, and the Infanta Luisa Fernanda of Spain. The Dukes of Orléans and Montpensier were siblings, both sons of King Louis-Philippe I of France, and Maria Amalia of the Two Sicilies.

== Marriage and issue ==
On 22 May 1886, Amélie married Carlos, Prince Royal of Portugal. He was the eldest son of King Luís I of Portugal and Maria Pia of Savoy. He was at the time the heir apparent to the throne. The bride was 19-years old and the groom about twenty-three. The marriage had been arranged by their families after several attempts to arrange a marriage for her with a member of the Austrian or Spanish dynasties. At first, the marriage was not popular and Queen Maria Pia was expecting to marry Carlos to Archduchess Marie Valerie of Austria, Princess Mathilde of Saxony, Princess Viktoria of Prussia or Princess Victoria of Wales. However, Amélie and Carlos came to live quite harmoniously with each other.

They had three children:

- Luís Filipe, Prince Royal and Duke of Braganza (21 March 1887 – 1 February 1908).
- Infanta Maria Anna of Portugal (born deceased on 14 December 1887).
- Manuel II of Portugal (15 November 1889 – 2 July 1932).

== Queen consort ==
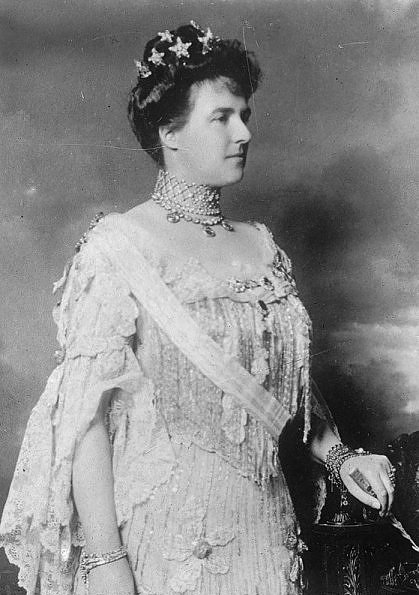
The Queen wearing the Diadem of the Stars

On 19 October 1889, King Luís died and Carlos succeeded him on the throne. Amélie became the new Queen consort of Portugal. However her husband became known for his extramarital affairs while the popularity of the Portuguese monarchy started to wane in the face of a bankrupt economy, industrial disturbances, socialist and republican antagonism and press criticism.

Amélie played an active role as a queen, and somewhat softened the growing criticism towards the monarchy with her personal popularity, though she did receive some criticism for her expenses. She was active in many social projects, such as the prevention and treatment of tuberculosis and the foundation of charity organisations, sanatoriums and drugstores. She was considered less formal than her mother-in-law Maria Pia, learned Portuguese well and was described as calm and mild. She was interested in literature, opera and theatre, was a diarist and also painted. During the absence of her spouse in 1895, she acted as regent. In 1902, she made a cruise on the Mediterranean Sea that was much criticised for its luxury.

In 1892, Pope Leo XIII gave a Golden Rose to Amélie.

== Queen dowager ==
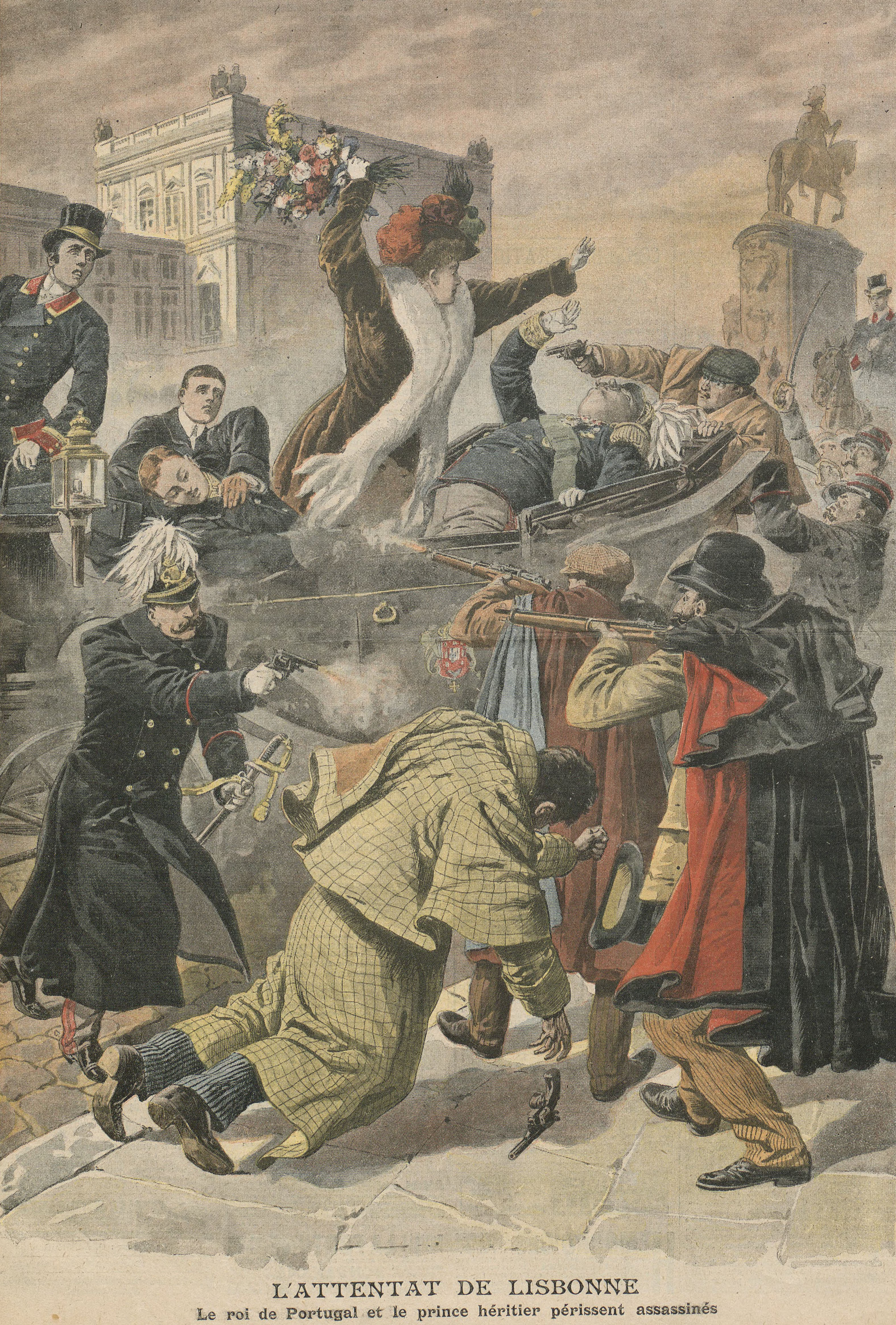
Illustration of the Lisbon Regicide

On 1 February 1908, the royal family returned from the palace of Vila Viçosa to Lisbon. They travelled in the royal train to Barreiro and from there took a boat to cross the Tagus River. They disembarked at Cais das Colunas in the principal square of downtown Lisbon, the Terreiro do Paço. On their way to the Palace of Necessidades, the carriage carrying Carlos and his family passed through the Rua do Arsenal. While crossing the square and turning to the street, several shots were fired from the crowd by at least two men (Alfredo Luís da Costa and Manuel Buiça), among others. The King died immediately, his heir Prince Dom Luís Filipe was mortally wounded and Infante Dom Manuel was hit in the arm. Queen Amélie remained unharmed as she tried to defend her youngest son, the new king Manuel II, with the flower bouquet she kept in her hand.

The two assassins were shot on the spot by members of the royal bodyguard and later were recognized as members of the Portuguese Republican Party and of their masonic left-wing organisation Carbonária. About twenty minutes later, Prince Luís Filipe died and the next day Manuel was acclaimed King of Portugal, the last of the Braganza dynasty.

Manuel II was deposed in a military coup, later known as the 5 October 1910 revolution, which resulted in the establishment of the Portuguese First Republic. Queen Amélie left Portugal with the rest of the royal family and went into exile. She lived most of her remaining life in France. During the Second World War, the Portuguese government invited her to return to Portugal, but she declined the offer. She visited Portugal for the last time in 1945.

== Later years and death ==
In 1949, Amélie left her Portuguese possessions to her godson, Duarte Pio, Duke of Braganza, at the request of Prime Minister António de Oliveira Salazar.

She died at 9:35 AM on 25 October 1951 from uremia. She was given a state funeral and buried at the Pantheon of the Braganzas located in the Monastery of São Vicente de Fora, in Lisbon, Portugal.

== Honours ==
- Knight Grand Cross of the Royal Order of the Immaculate Conception of Vila Viçosa (House of Braganza)
- Knight Grand Cross with Collar of the Royal Order of Christ (House of Braganza)
- Recipient Sash of the Three Orders, 9 May 1909 (House of Braganza)
- 7th Grand Mistress Dame Grand Cross of the Royal Order of Queen Saint Isabel (House of Braganza)
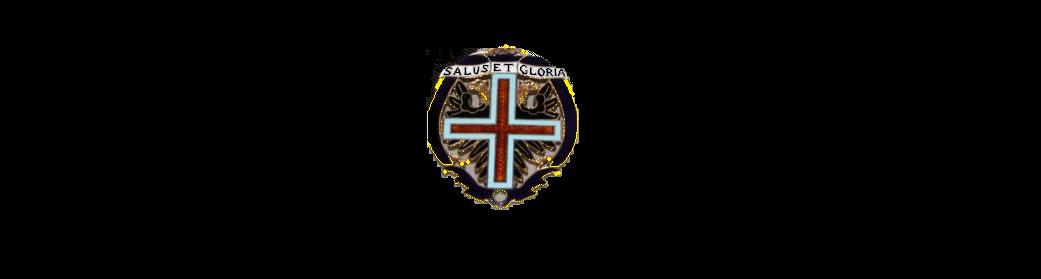
- Dame of the Imperial and Royal Order of the Starry Cross (Austrian Imperial and Royal Family)
- Dame Grand Cross of Obedience of the Sovereign Military Order of Malta
- 867th Dame Grand Cross of the Order of Queen Maria Luisa, 25 October 1886 (Kingdom of Spain)
- Dame Grand Cordon of the Imperial Order of Saint Catherine, 1895 (Russian Imperial Family)

Amélie of Orléans House of Orléans Cadet branch of the House of Bourbon Born: 28 September 1865 Died: 25 October 1951
Portuguese royalty
Preceded by Maria Pia of Savoy	Queen consort of Portugal and the Algarves; 19 October 1889 – 1 February 1908	Monarchy abolished
