= Carlos I of Portugal =

King of Portugal from 1889 to 1908

Carlos I
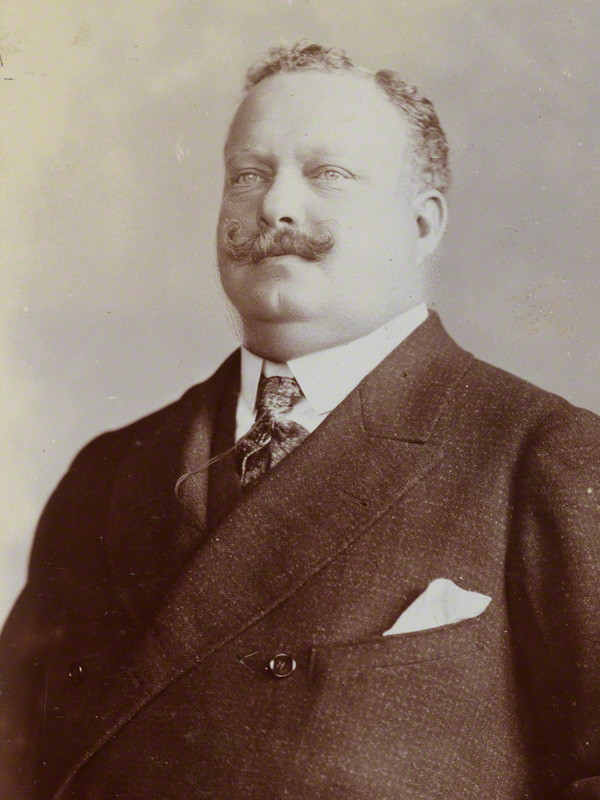
- Portrait, c. 1907 or before

King of Portugal
- Reign: 19 October 1889 – 1 February 1908
- Acclamation: 28 December 1889
- Predecessor: Luís I
- Successor: Manuel II
- Prime Ministers: See list: José Luciano de Castro António Serpa João Crisóstomo José Dias Ferreira Hintze Ribeiro João Franco
- Born: 28 September 1863; Ajuda Palace, Lisbon, Portugal
- Died: 1 February 1908 (aged 44); Terreiro do Paço, Lisbon, Portugal
- Burial: Pantheon of the Braganzas
- Spouse: Amélie of Orléans (m. 1886)
- Issue Detail: Luís Filipe, Prince Royal; Infanta Maria Ana; Manuel II, King of Portugal
Names
- Carlos Fernando Luís Maria Víctor Miguel Rafael Gabriel Gonzaga Xavier Francisco de Assis José Simão
- House: Braganza (Note: "While remaining patrilineal dynasts of the duchy of Saxe-Coburg and Gotha according to pp. 88, 116 of the 1944 Almanach de Gotha, Title 1, Chapter 1, Article 5 of the 1838 Portuguese constitution declared, with respect to Ferdinand II of Portugal's issue by his first wife, that 'the Most Serene House of Braganza is the reigning house of Portugal and continues through the Person of the Lady Queen Maria II'. Thus their mutual descendants constitute the Coburg line of the House of Braganza".)
- Father: Luís I
- Mother: Maria Pia of Savoy

Dom Carlos I (Anglicized: Charles I, Carlos Fernando Luís Maria Víctor Miguel Rafael Gabriel Gonzaga Xavier Francisco de Assis José Simão; 28 September 1863 – 1 February 1908), known as "the Diplomat" (o Diplomata), "the Oceanographer" (o Oceanógrafo) among many other names, was King of Portugal from 1889 until his assassination in 1908. He was the first Portuguese king to die a violent death since King Sebastian in 1578, the only one to be assassinated, and penultimate Portuguese head of state to die a violent death. (Note: Sidónio Pais, now exercising that role as president, was also assassinated)

== Early life ==
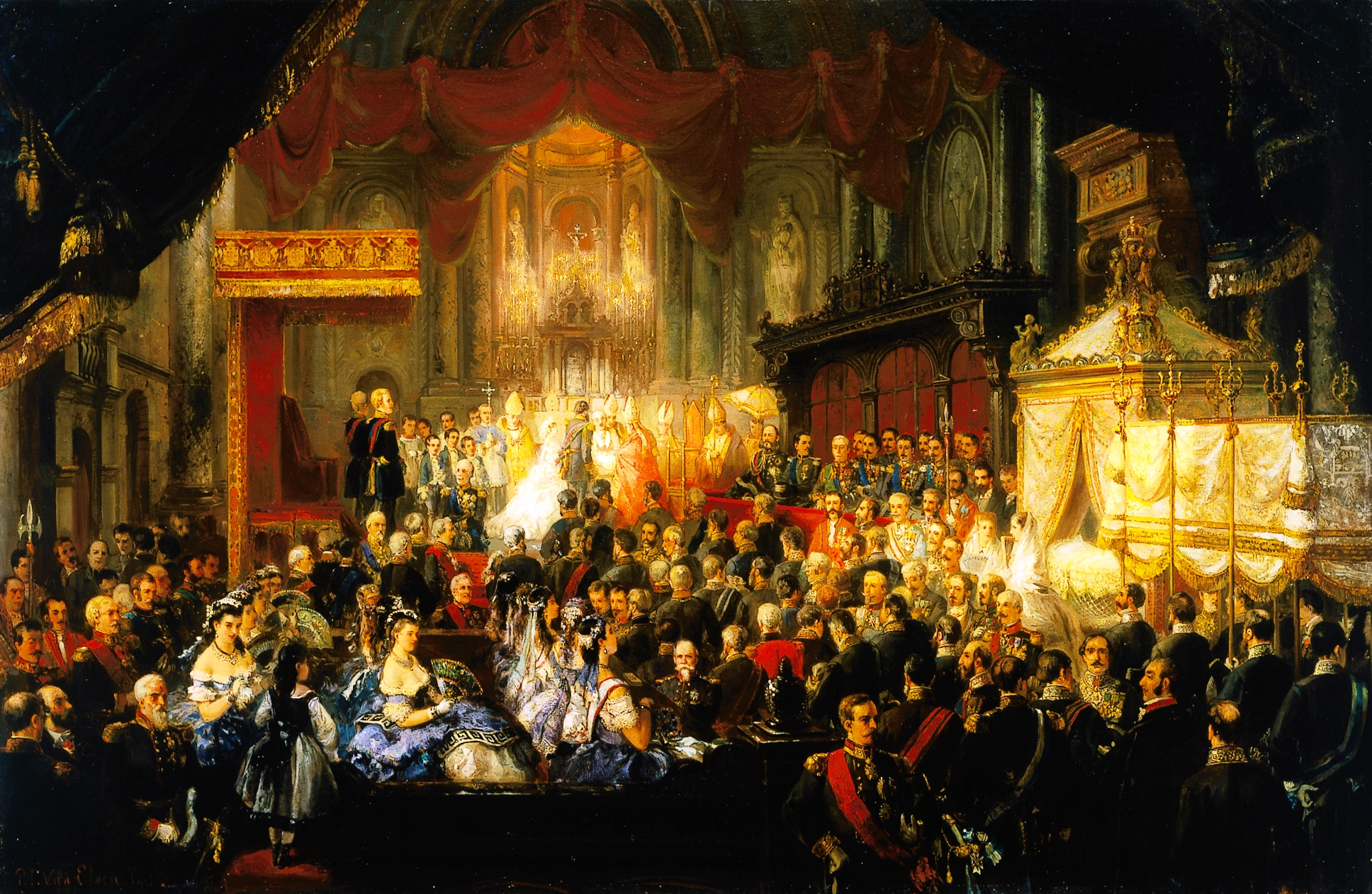
The baptism of D. Carlos, c. 1863

Carlos was born in Lisbon, Portugal, the son of King Luís and Queen Maria Pia, daughter of King Victor Emmanuel II of Italy, and was a member of the House of Braganza. He had a brother, Infante Afonso, Duke of Porto. He was baptised with the names Carlos Fernando Luís Maria Víctor Miguel Rafael Gabriel Gonzaga Xavier Francisco de Assis José Simão.

He had an intense education and was prepared to rule as a constitutional monarch. In 1883, he traveled to Italy, the United Kingdom, France and Germany, where he increased his knowledge of the modern civilization of his time. In 1883, 1886 and 1888, he ruled as Regent as his father was traveling in Europe, as had become traditional among the Portuguese constitutional kings. His father Luis I advised him to be modest and to study with focus.

His first bridal candidate was one of the daughters of German Emperor Frederick III, but the issue of religion presented an insurmountable problem, and diplomatic pressure from the British government prevented the marriage. He then met and married Princess Amélie of Orléans, eldest daughter of Philippe, comte de Paris, pretender to the throne of France.

== Reign ==
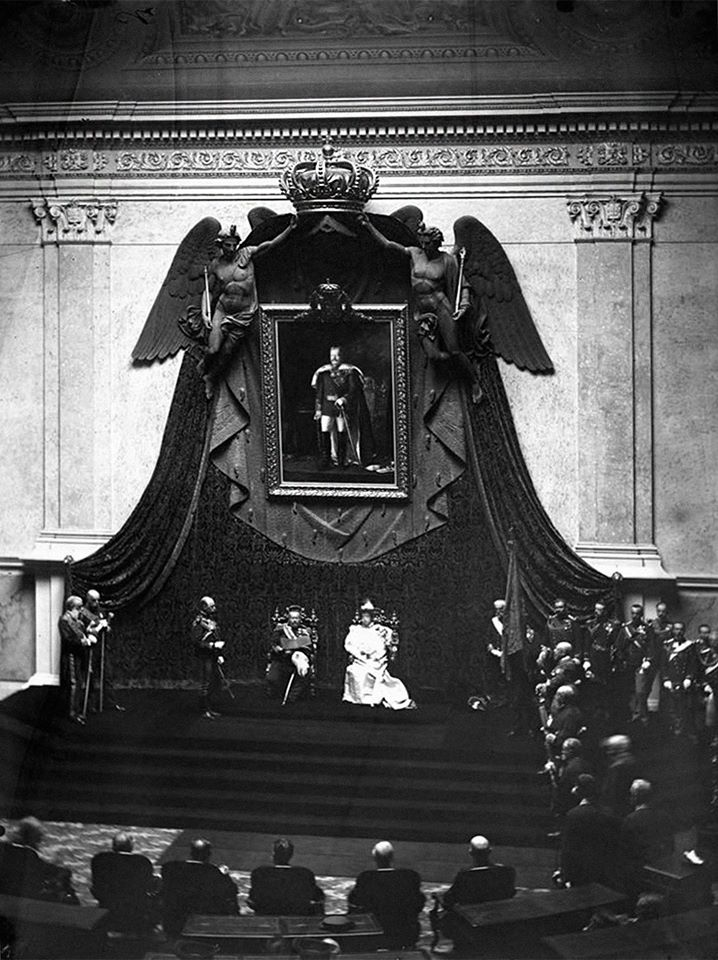
King Carlos I delivering the Crown speech at the opening of the Parliament in Lisbon, 1900.

Carlos became king on 19 October 1889. After the 1890 British Ultimatum, a series of treaties were signed with the United Kingdom. One signed in August 1890 defined colonial borders in Africa along the Zambezi and Congo rivers, whereas another signed on 14 October 1899 confirmed colonial treaties dating back to the 17th century. These treaties stabilised the political balance in Africa, ending Portuguese claims of sovereignty on the Pink Map, a geographical conception of how Portuguese colonies would appear on a map if the territory between the coastal colonies of Angola and Mozambique could be connected with territory in central Africa. These central African territories became part of the British Empire with the Portuguese concession becoming a source of national resentment in the country.

Domestically, Portugal declared bankruptcy twice – on 14 June 1892, then again on 10 May 1902 – causing industrial disturbances, socialist and republican antagonism and press criticism of the monarchy. Carlos responded by appointing João Franco as prime minister and subsequently accepting parliament's dissolution.

As a patron of science and the arts, King Carlos took an active part in the celebration of the 500th anniversary of the birth of Prince Henry the Navigator in 1894. The following year he decorated the Portuguese poet João de Deus in a ceremony in Lisbon.

Carlos took a personal interest in deep-sea and maritime exploration and used several yachts named Amélia on his oceanographical voyages. He published an account of his own studies in this area.

== Assassination ==
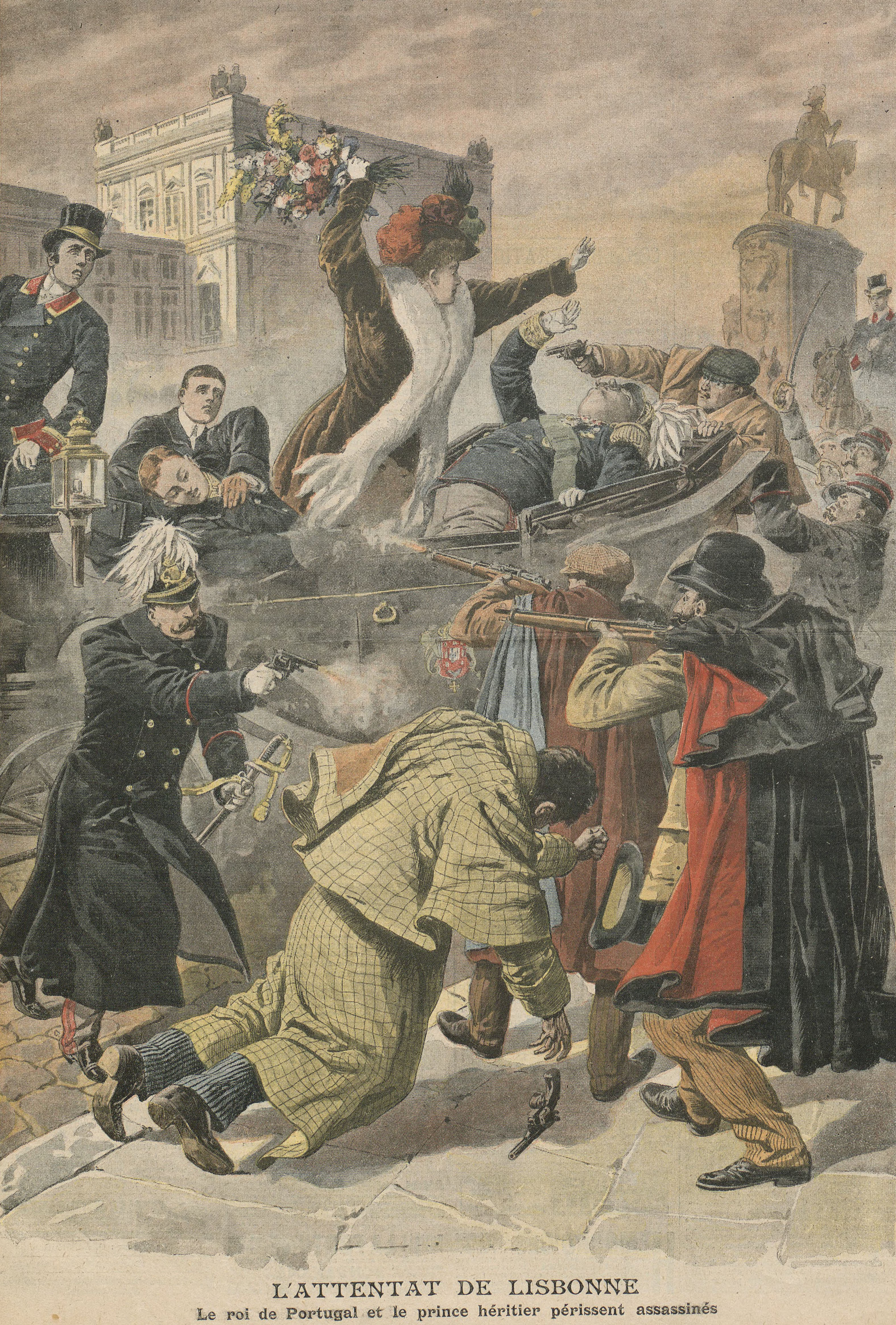
The regicide, 1908

On 1 February 1908, the royal family was returning to Lisbon from the Ducal Palace of Vila Viçosa in Alentejo, where they had spent part of the hunting season during the winter. The royal party traveled by train to Barreiro, from there taking a steamer to cross the Tagus River and disembarking at Cais do Sodré in central Lisbon. On their way to the royal palace, the open carriage containing Carlos I and his family passed through the Terreiro do Paço fronting on the river. In spite of recent political unrest there was no military escort, except for a single mounted officer riding by the carriage. While the carriage was crossing the square at dusk, shots were fired from amongst the sparse crowd by two republican activists, Alfredo Luís da Costa and Manuel Buíça.

Buíça, a former army sergeant and sharpshooter, fired five shots from a rifle hidden under his long overcoat. The king died immediately, his heir Luís Filipe was mortally wounded, and Prince Manuel was hit in the arm. The queen escaped injury. The two assassins were killed on the spot by police, and an innocent bystander, João da Costa, was also shot dead in the confusion. The royal carriage turned into the nearby Navy Arsenal, where, about twenty minutes later, Prince Luís Filipe died. Several days later, the younger son, Prince Manuel, was proclaimed king of Portugal. He was the last of the Braganza-Saxe-Coburg and Gotha dynasty and the final king of Portugal.

== Marriage and children ==
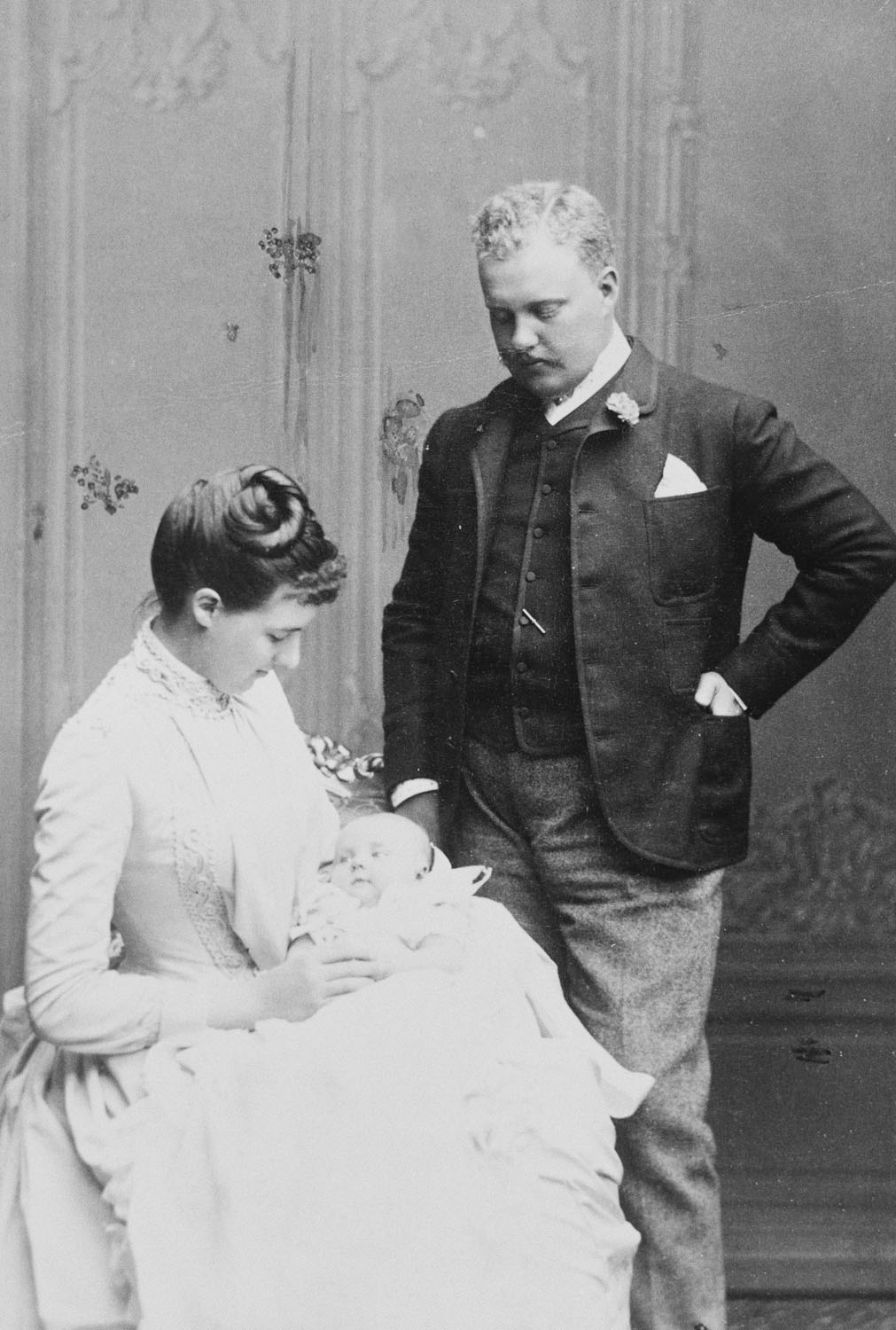
Carlos I and Dona Maria Amélia with their firstborn son, 1888.

Carlos I was married to Princess Amélie of Orléans on 22 May 1886. She was the daughter of Philippe, Count of Paris, and Princess Marie Isabelle of Orléans. They had three children:

- Luís Filipe, Prince Royal of Portugal (21 March 1887 – 1 February 1908)
- Infanta Maria Ana of Braganza (b/d 14 December 1887)
- Manuel II, King of Portugal between 1908 and 1910 (15 November 1889 – 2 July 1932)

Allegedly, Carlos I had several extramarital relationships, from which some illegitimate children were born. He may have had a daughter from an American. By Grimaneza Viana de Lima, a Peruvian widow of a Brazilian diplomat, he possibly had a daughter called Maria Pia, born before 1902. Grimaneza was his last great passion. Allegedly, he also had, from the Brazilian Maria Amélia Laredó e Murça, another daughter, born in 1907 and also called Maria Pia. During his life, Carlos I never officially recognized the paternity of any illegitimate child, despite the fact that he himself was responsible for fueling suspicions about his illegitimate offspring.

== Honours ==
Portuguese

- Grand Commander of the Three Military Orders of Christ, Aviz and St. James
- Grand Cross of the Tower and Sword
- Grand Cross of the Immaculate Conception of Vila Viçosa

Foreign

- (Austrian Empire) (Kingdom of Hungary) Austria-Hungary: Grand Cross of the Royal Hungarian Order of St. Stephen, 1873
- Empire of Brazil: Grand Cross of the Southern Cross, 1873
- Denmark: Knight of the Elephant, 7 October 1883
- German Empire:
  - Knight of the Black Eagle, 10 September 1883
  - Grand Cross of the Red Eagle
  - (Saxe-Coburg and Gotha) (Duchy of Saxe-Altenburg) (Saxe-Meiningen) Ernestine duchies: Grand Cross of the Saxe-Ernestine House Order, 1884
  - Hesse and by Rhine: Grand Cross of the Ludwig Order, 24 September 1883
  - Saxe-Weimar-Eisenach: Grand Cross of the White Falcon, 1883
  - Saxony: Knight of the Rue Crown, 1883
- Kingdom of Italy:
  - Knight of the Annunciation, 31 December 1873
  - Grand Cross of Saints Maurice and Lazarus, 31 December 1873
  - Grand Cross of the Crown of Italy, 31 December 1873
- Holy See: Grand Cross of the Holy Sepulchre of Jerusalem
- Sovereign Military Order of Malta: Bailiff Grand Cross of Honour and Devotion
- Empire of Japan: Grand Cordon of the Order of the Chrysanthemum, 5 June 1897
- Kingdom of Romania: Grand Cross of the Order of Carol I, with Collar, 1906
- Siam: Knight of the Order of the Royal House of Chakri, 23 October 1897
- Kingdom of Spain:
  - Knight of the Golden Fleece, 11 December 1866
  - Grand Cross of the Order of Charles III, with Collar, 12 December 1902
- Sweden-Norway:
  - Knight of the Seraphim, 23 May 1873
  - Grand Cross of St. Olav, 11 October 1883
- United Kingdom:
  - Stranger Knight Companion of the Garter, 9 November 1895
  - Recipient of the Royal Victorian Chain, 19 November 1902
- Russian Empire:
  - Knight of St. Andrew
  - Knight of St. Alexander Nevsky
  - Knight of the White Eagle
  - Knight of St. Anna, 1st Class
  - Knight of St. Stanislaus, 1st Class

== Ancestry ==
Ancestors of Carlos I of Portugal

8. Prince Ferdinand of Saxe-Coburg and Gotha
4. Ferdinand II of Portugal
9. Princess Maria Antonia Koháry of Csábrág and Szitnya
2. Luís I of Portugal
10. Pedro I of Brazil and IV of Portugal
5. Maria II of Portugal
11. Archduchess Leopoldina of Austria
1. Carlos I of Portugal
12. Charles Albert of Sardinia
6. Victor Emmanuel II of Italy
13. Archduchess Maria Theresa of Austria
3. Princess Maria Pia of Savoy
14. Archduke Rainer of Austria
7. Archduchess Adelaide of Austria
15. Princess Elisabeth of Savoy

== General references ==
- Jean Pailler: D. Carlos I – Rei de Portugal: Destino Maldito de um Rei Sacrificado. Bertrand, Lisbon, 2001, ISBN 978-972-25-1231-2
- Jean Pailler: Maria Pia: A Mulher que Queria Ser Rainha de Portugal. Bertrand, Lisbon, 2006, ISBN 972-25-1467-9
- Manuel Amaral: Portugal – Dicionário Histórico, Corográfico, Heráldico, Biográfico, Bibliográfico, Numismático e Artístico, Volume II, 1904–1915, págs. 759
- Rui Ramos: D. Carlos, Temas e Debates, Lisbon, 2007.
- New York Times: 2 February 1908 Issue https://timesmachine.nytimes.com/timesmachine/1908/02/02/issue.html

Carlos I of Portugal House of Braganza Cadet branch of the House of Aviz Born: 28 September 1863 Died: 1 February 1908
Regnal titles
Preceded by Luís I	King of Portugal; 19 October 1889 – 1 February 1908	Succeeded by Manuel II
Portuguese royalty
Preceded by Pedro V	Prince Royal of Portugal; 28 September 1863 – 19 October 1889	Succeeded by Luís Filipe
Preceded by Pedro V	Duke of Braganza; 28 September 1863 – 19 October 1889	Succeeded by Luís Filipe
