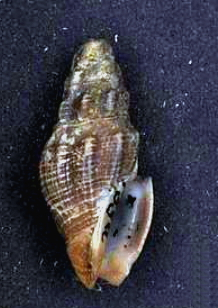
- Shell of Crassispira carbonaria (specimen at Naturalis Biodiversity Center)

Scientific classification
- Kingdom: Animalia
- Phylum: Mollusca
- Class: Gastropoda
- Subclass: Caenogastropoda
- Order: Neogastropoda
- Superfamily: Conoidea
- Family: Pseudomelatomidae
- Genus: Crassispira
- Species: C. carbonaria

Binomial name
- Crassispira carbonaria (Reeve, 1843)

Synonyms
- Pleurotoma carbonaria Reeve, 1843; Pleurotoma (Crassispira) carbonaria Reeve, 1843; Pleurotoma salsipotens Rochebrune, 1883

= Crassispira carbonaria =

Species of gastropod

Crassispira carbonaria is a species of sea snail, a marine gastropod mollusk in the family Pseudomelatomidae.

== Description ==
The length of the shell varies between 18 mm and 35 mm.

The shell is very solid, with a well-defined shoulder, and sulcate space above it. The longitudinal ribs are low, rounded, closer than in Crassispira bottae. The interspaces are very narrow, crossed by raised revolving lines. The shell is chocolate-colored.

== Distribution ==
This marine species occurs off West Africa, Gabon, Senegal and Guinea Bissau
