= Pizzo Carbonara =

Mountain in Italy

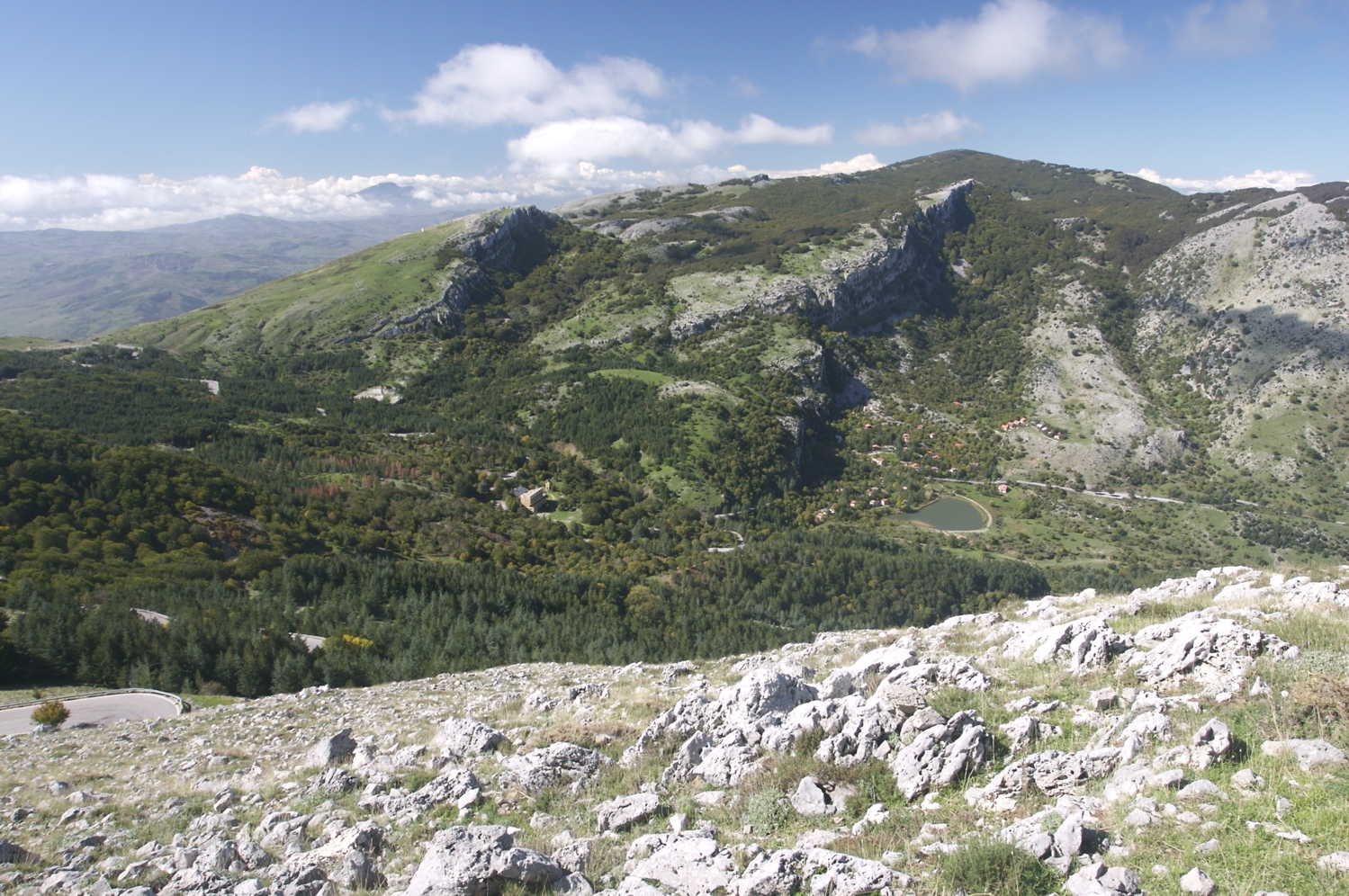

Highest point
- Elevation: 1,979 m (6,493 ft)
- Prominence: 1,196 m (3,924 ft)
- Isolation: 83.49 km (51.88 mi)
- Listing: Ribu
- Coordinates: 37°53′39″N 14°01′31″E

Geography
- Location within Italy
- Location: Palermo Province, Sicily, Italy

Climbing
- Easiest route: mountain walk from the road at Piano Battaglia

Pizzo Carbonara is the highest peak of the Madonie mountains in Sicily. It is the second-highest peak in Sicily, only Mount Etna being higher, although it is only two meters higher than the neighbouring Pizzo Antenna.

Pizzo Carbonara is located about 10 km NW of Petralia Sottana. It is a limestone massif, and rainwater falling on it eventually emerges at the foot of the castle rock of Cefalù on the north coast of Sicily. Its summit is more of a plateau than a peak, so that it is not easy to determine the highest point.

In good weather, Pizzo Carbonara is readily climbed from the Piano Battaglia (1605 m), which can be reached by road, the round trip taking about 2 hrs 30 minutes for an average fit person. It does not involve any rock-climbing or scrambling. However, as of 2006, there is no clearly marked path up the mountain, accurate maps are not readily available, and the plateau is prone to mist. Accordingly, it is advisable to carry a compass or GPS when climbing the mountain. Guidebooks do not recommend climbing it in winter.
