= Carbonera =

Carbonera may refer to:

- Carbonera, Colorado, United States, an extinct town in Garfield County, Colorado
- Carbonera, Veneto, Italy, a comune
- Carbonera (grape), an Italian wine grape
- Bar jack, a fish

== See also ==
- Carbonara (disambiguation)
