= Carbonária =

19th-century group in Portugal

Symbol found on various documents belonging to the Venda Jovem-Portugal, the highest body of the Carbonária.

The Carbonária was an anti-clerical, revolutionary, conspiratorial society, originally established in Portugal in 1822 and soon disbanded. It was allied with the Italian Carbonari. A new organization of the same name and claiming to be its continuation was founded in 1896 by Artur Augusto Duarte da Luz de Almeida. This organization agitated against the monarchy and was involved in various anti-monarchist conspiracies. Its operational units, structured into a hierarchy of barracas, choças and vendas, received military training.

On 1 February, 1908 King Carlos I of Portugal and his eldest son and heir Luis Filipe were assassinated by Alfredo Luís da Costa and Manuel Buíça in a conspiracy involving the Carbonária.

By 1910, the Carbonária had some 40,000 members and was instrumental in the Republican 5 October 1910 revolution.

== See also ==
- Lisbon Regicide
- Secret society
