= Mecolaesthus =

Scientific classification
- Kingdom: Animalia
- Phylum: Arthropoda
- Subphylum: Chelicerata
- Class: Arachnida
- Order: Araneae
- Infraorder: Araneomorphae
- Family: Pholcidae
- Genus: Mecolaesthus; Simon, 1893

Type species
- M. longissimus Simon, 1893

Species
- 40, see text

Synonyms
- Ayomania González-Sponga, 2005; Carbonaria González-Sponga, 2009; Falconia González-Sponga, 2003; Maimire González-Sponga, 2009; Moraia González-Sponga, 2011; Nasuta González-Sponga, 2009; Queliceria González-Sponga, 2003; Sanluisi González-Sponga, 2003; Venezuela Koçak & Kemal, 2008

Genus of spiders

Mecolaesthus is a genus of cellar spiders that was first described by Eugène Louis Simon in 1893.

== Species ==
As of March 2023 it contains forty species, found in South America, Dominica, on Saint Vincent and the Grenadines, Trinidad and Tobago, and Guadeloupe:

- Mecolaesthus alegria Huber, 2020 – Venezuela
- Mecolaesthus anzu Huber, 2023 – Ecuador
- Mecolaesthus arepa Huber, 2020 – Venezuela
- Mecolaesthus arima Huber, 2000 – Trinidad
- Mecolaesthus azulita Huber, 2000 – Venezuela
- Mecolaesthus bienmesabe Huber, 2020 – Venezuela
- Mecolaesthus cachapa Huber, 2020 – Venezuela
- Mecolaesthus chicha Huber, 2020 – Venezuela
- Mecolaesthus chuwitayo Huber, 2023 – Ecuador
- Mecolaesthus cordiformis (González-Sponga, 2009) – Venezuela
- Mecolaesthus cornutus Huber, 2000 – Venezuela
- Mecolaesthus discrepantis (González-Sponga, 2003) – Venezuela
- Mecolaesthus fallax Huber, 2020 – Venezuela
- Mecolaesthus grandis (González-Sponga, 2009) – Venezuela
- Mecolaesthus graphorn Huber, 2020 – Venezuela
- Mecolaesthus guasacaca Huber, 2020 – Venezuela
- Mecolaesthus hoti Huber, 2000 – Venezuela
- Mecolaesthus lechosa Huber, 2020 – Venezuela
- Mecolaesthus lemniscatus (Simon, 1894) – St. Vincent
- Mecolaesthus limon Huber, 2020 – Venezuela
- Mecolaesthus longipes Huber, 2020 – Venezuela
- Mecolaesthus longissimus Simon, 1893 (type) – Venezuela
- Mecolaesthus misahualli Huber, 2023 – Ecuador
- Mecolaesthus mucuy Huber, 2000 – Venezuela
- Mecolaesthus multidenticulatus (González-Sponga, 2003) – Venezuela
- Mecolaesthus nigrifrons (Simon, 1894) – St. Vincent
- Mecolaesthus niquitanus (González-Sponga, 2011) – Venezuela
- Mecolaesthus parchita Huber, 2020 – Venezuela
- Mecolaesthus peckorum Huber, 2000 – Venezuela
- Mecolaesthus piedras Huber, 2020 – Venezuela
- Mecolaesthus puntiagudus (González-Sponga, 2003) – Venezuela
- Mecolaesthus pusillus Huber, 2020 – Venezuela
- Mecolaesthus putumayo Huber, 2000 – Colombia
- Mecolaesthus quasimodo Huber, 2023 – Ecuador
- Mecolaesthus tabay Huber, 2000 – Venezuela
- Mecolaesthus taino Huber, 2000 – Guadeloupe, Dominica
- Mecolaesthus trampa Huber, 2020 – Venezuela
- Mecolaesthus tuberculosus (González-Sponga, 2009) – Venezuela
- Mecolaesthus yawaperi Huber, 2000 – Brazil
- Mecolaesthus yerbatero Huber, 2020 – Venezuela
