= Carbonaro =

Carbonaro may refer to:

- Singular form of Carbonari
- Michael Carbonaro, American actor and magician
- The Carbonaro Effect, a hidden-camera TV series hosted by Michael Carbonaro
- John Carbonaro, owner of JC Comics
- Martino Carbonaro, an 1801 Italian opera
- Arturo Carbonaro (born 1986), Italian footballer
- Paolo Carbonaro (born 1989), Italian footballer

== See also ==
- Carbonara
