= Aquilino Ribeiro =

Portuguese writer and diplomat

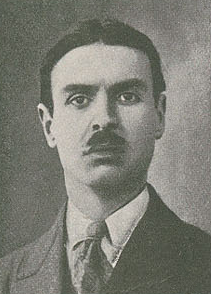
- Aquilino Ribeiro, c. 1918
- Born: Aquilino Gomes Ribeiro; 13 September 1885; Tabosa do Carregal, Sernancelhe, Viseu, Portugal
- Died: 27 May 1963 (aged 77); Lisbon, Portugal
- Occupation: Writer
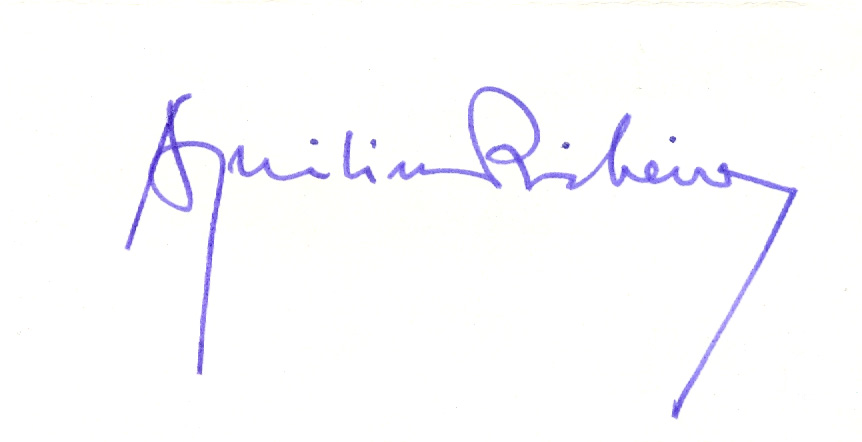
- Spouses: Grete Tiedemann (m. 1913; div. 1927); Jerónima Dantas Machado (m. 1929)
- Writing career
- Notable work: Cinco reis de gente

Aquilino Gomes Ribeiro, ComL (Portuguese pronunciation: [ɐkiˈlinu ʁiˈbɐjɾu]; 13 September 1885 – 27 May 1963, Lisbon), was a Portuguese writer and diplomat. He is generally considered to be one of the great Portuguese novelists of the 20th century. In 1960, he was nominated for the Nobel Prize in Literature; having been nominated by the Sociedade Portuguesa de Escritores.

== Biography ==
Born in Carregal de Tabosa, Sernancelhe, the natural son of Joaquim Francisco Ribeiro, a priest, and Mariana do Rosário Gomes, he had three older siblings: Maria do Rosário, Melchior and Joaquim. He was originally destined for the priesthood, but became involved with the Portuguese Republican Party in opposition to the Royal House of Braganza.

Although he did not participate directly, he was involved in the Lisbon Regicide and knew the plan and the assassins, as he stated in his work "Um escritor confessa-se” (A Writer Confesses). Between 1908 and 1914, he lived between Paris and Berlin, cities where he broadened his horizons enormously.

In 1914, he returned to Portugal, after the start of World War I. By then, the Portuguese First Republic had been established.

He was later involved in opposition to António de Oliveira Salazar and the Estado Novo, whose government had moved to censor or ban several of his books.

He was married twice: in 1913 to Grete Tiedemann (ca. 1890-1927), a German, by whom he had a son, Aníbal Aquilino Fritz Tiedeman Ribeiro in 1914; then, in 1929, to Jerónima Dantas Machado, daughter of the deposed President of Portugal Bernardino Machado, by whom he had a son Aquilino Ribeiro Machado, in 1930, who became the 60th Mayor of Lisbon (1977–1979).

== Novels ==
- A via sinuosa (1918)
- Terras do demo (1919)
- Filhas da Babilónia (1920)
- Romance da Raposa (1924)
- Andam faunos pelos bosques (1926)
- O homem que matou o diabo (1930)
- A batalha sem fim (1932)
- As três mulheres de Sansão (1932)
- Maria Benigna (1933)
- Aventura maravilhosa (1936)
- São Bonaboião: anacoreta e mártir (1937)
- Mónica (1939)
- O servo de Deus e a casa roubada (1941)
- Volfrâmio (1943)
- Lápides partidas (1945)
- Caminhos errados (1947)
- O arcanjo negro (1947)
- Humildade gloriosa (1954)
- A Casa Grande de Romarigães (1957)
- Quando os lobos uivam (1958)
  - in English: When the Wolves Howl, translated by Patricia McGowan Pinheiro (1963)
- A mina de diamantes (1958)
- O Malhadinhas (1958)
- Arcas encoiradas (1962)
- Casa do escorpião (1963)
