= Saint Peter (Grão Vasco) =

Painting by Grão Vasco

Saint Peter Enthroned as Pope
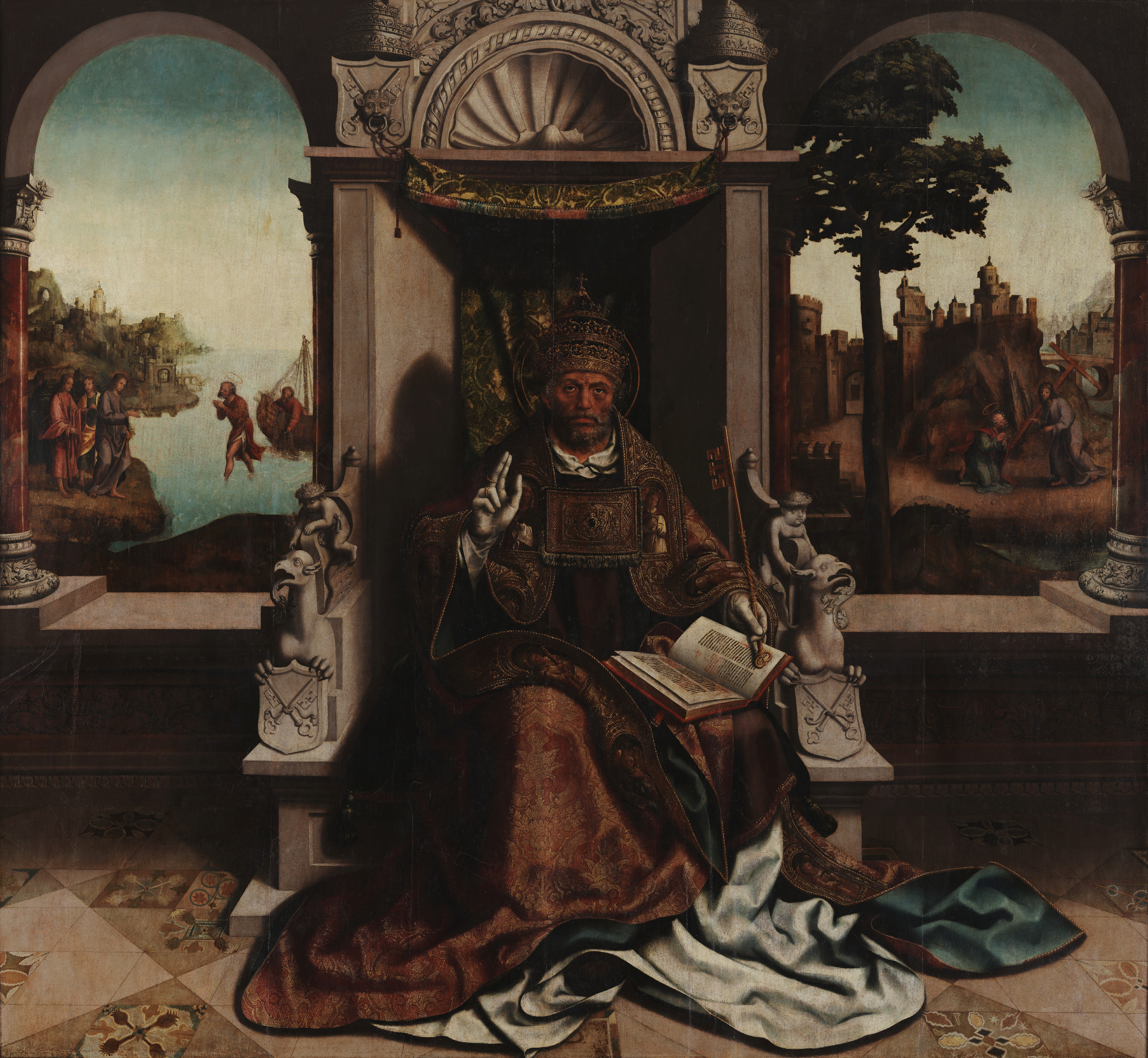
- Artist: Grão Vasco
- Year: c. 1529
- Medium: Oil on panel
- Subject: Peter the Apostle
- Dimensions: 215 cm × 233.3 cm (85 in × 91.9 in)
- Location: Grão Vasco National Museum, Viseu

Saint Peter is a painting by Portuguese artist Grão Vasco, dated c. 1529. Commissioned by Miguel da Silva, originally meant to serve as an altarpiece for a side altar of the Viseu Cathedral, the painting is now part of the collections of Grão Vasco National Museum, in Viseu, Portugal.

The painting is considered a masterpiece of the Portuguese Renaissance. Anglo-Irish art critic Sir William Henry Gregory called Saint Peter "one of the chief ornaments of any gallery in the world from its grandeur and simplicity".

== Description ==
Saint Peter is at the centre of the symmetrical composition, sitting on an ornate Italianate pontifical throne making the blessing gesture toward the viewer, in full Papal regalia: the ample cope, of rich red brocade, features finely woven ornamental motifs in gold thread and medallions with angels holding the Instruments of the Passion, pearls and precious stones; the papal tiara features three intricately decorated gold circlets with arabesque patterns of interlacing foliage; the pontifical gloves are white and the Ring of the Fisherman is visible, set with a dark green gem. On his left hand, in place of a crosier, Peter holds an elongated golden key, in reference to the Keys of Heaven, an attribute of this saint and a symbol of papal authority. The top of the throne features some Manueline decorative elements (like the vegetalist details at the top), as well as some pagan elements such as the carved putti and grotesques that hold the papal arms as well as the brocade canopy over the seat.

On either side of the throne, two arches open to distant views of two episodes of Saint Peter's life: on the left, the Gospel narrative of Jesus Christ calling Peter and Andrew to become his disciples; on the right, the Quo vadis? from the apocryphal Acts of Peter, as the risen Jesus appears to him just before his martyrdom.

The painting, as an altarpiece, also features a predella underneath it; it has three smaller paintings depicting Saint John the Evangelist and Saint Andrew, Saint Bartholomew and Saint Jude, and Saint Paul and Saint James.

Paintings in the predella of Saint Peter

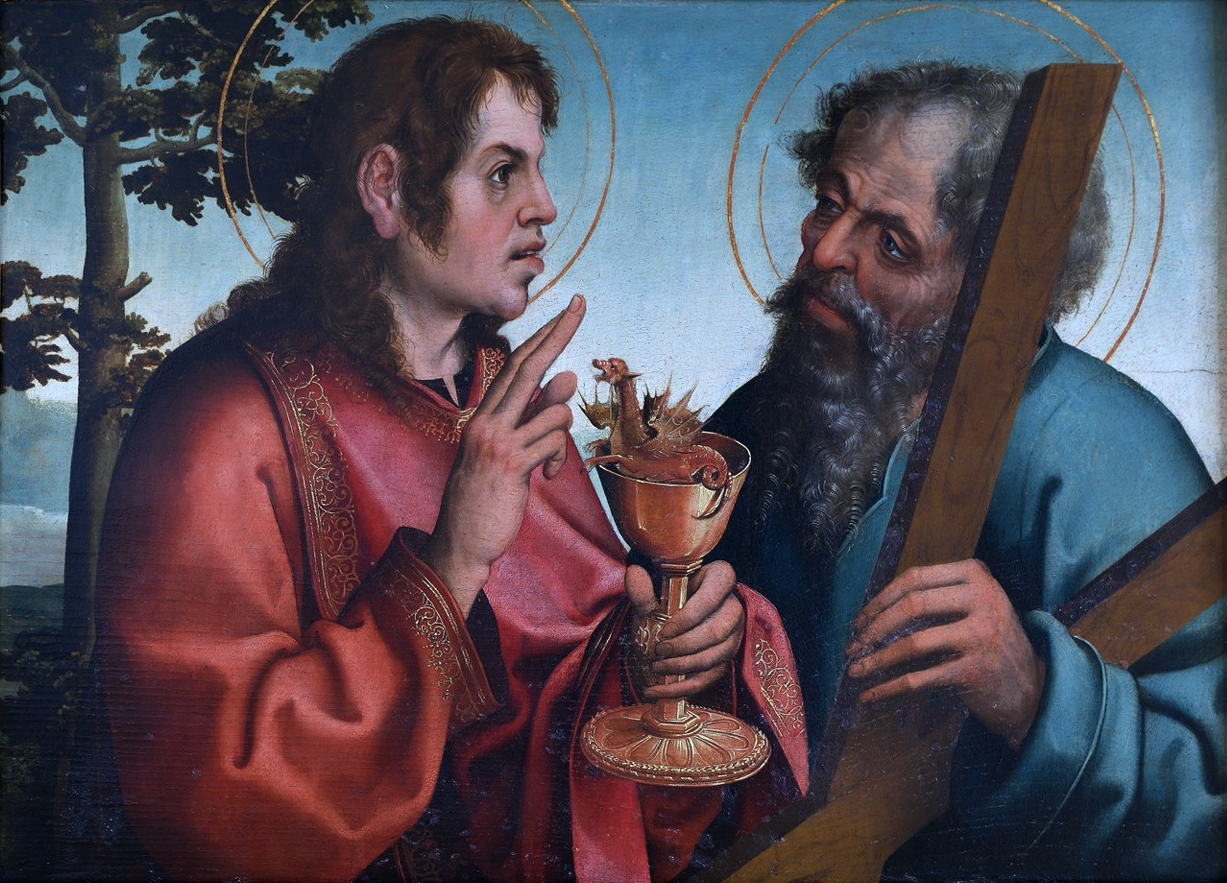
Saint John the Evangelist and Saint Andrew

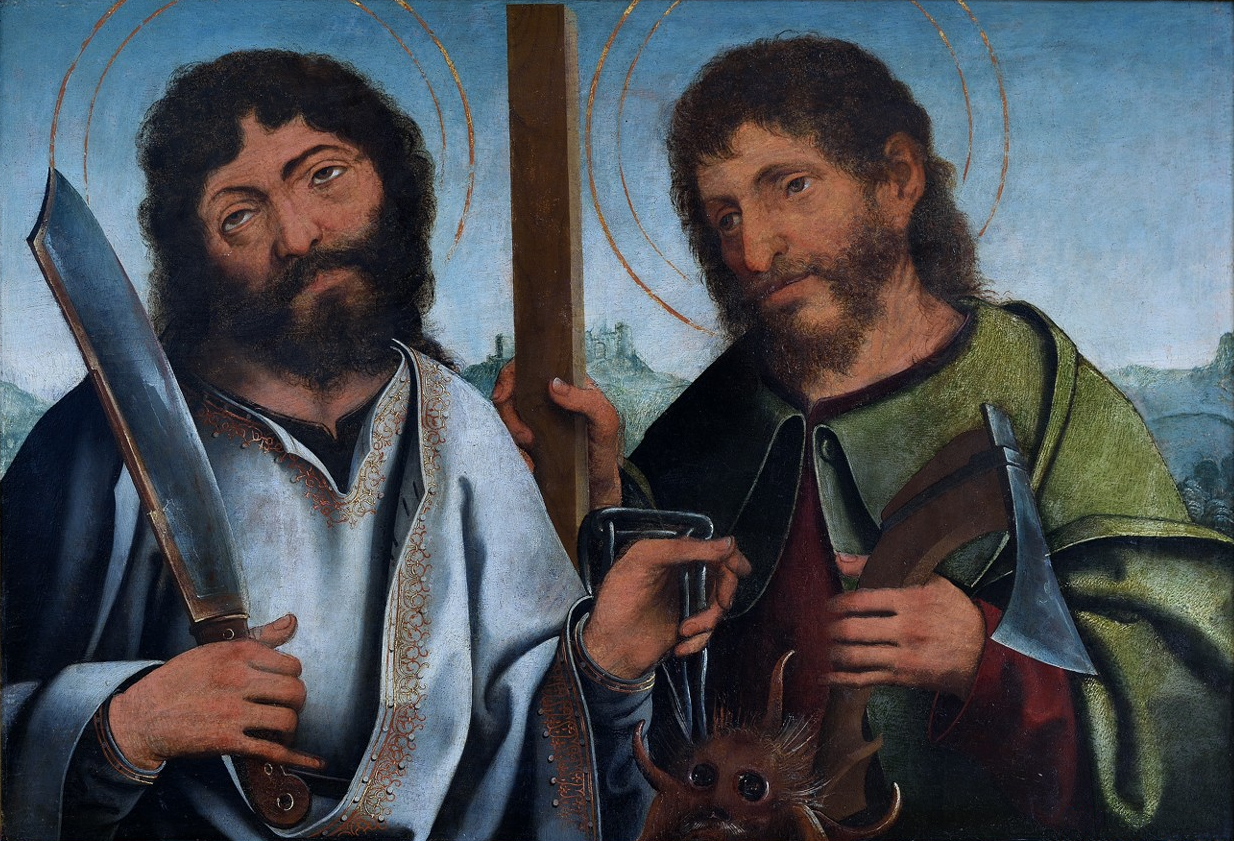
Saint Bartholomew and Saint Jude

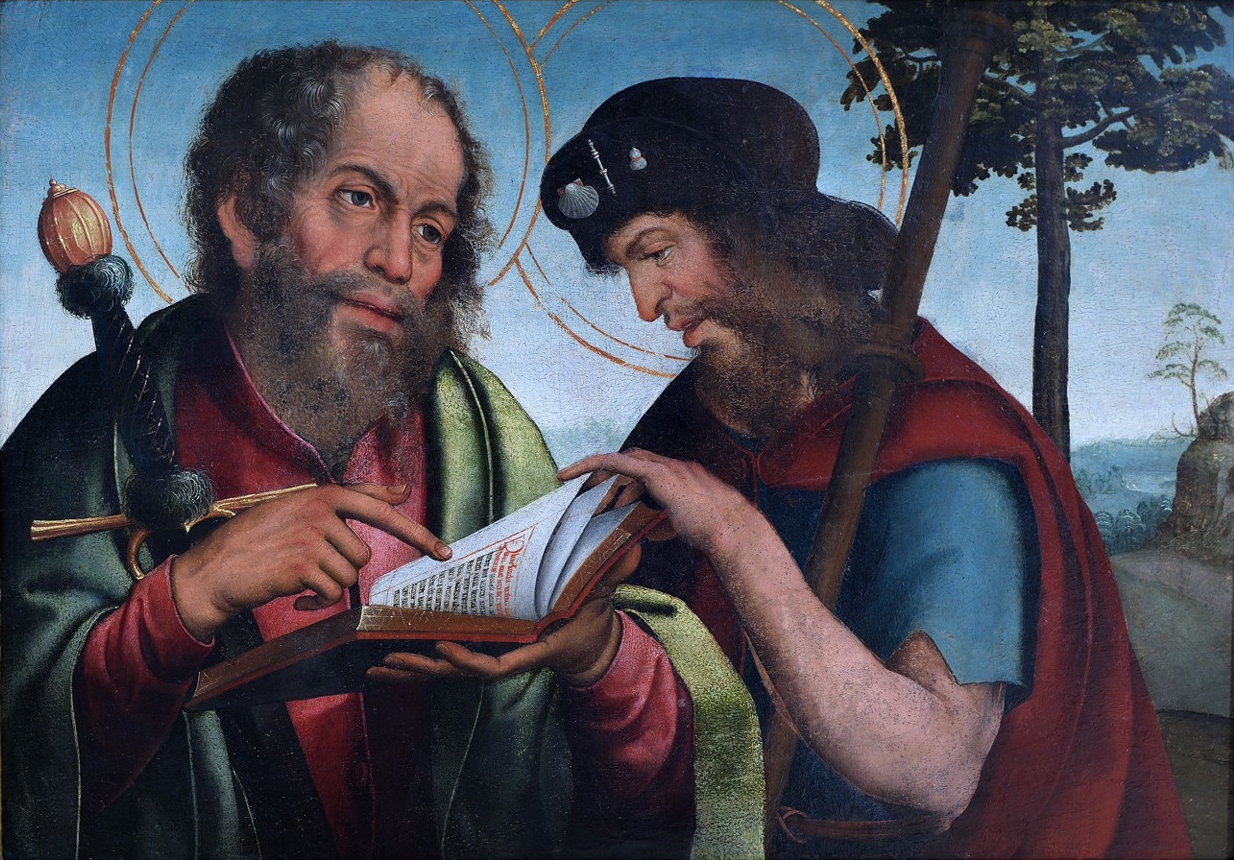
Saint Paul and Saint James

== History ==
From records of payments from the chapter of Viseu Cathedral, it is known that Vasco Fernandes (later commonly referred to by the moniker Grão Vasco, "The Great Vasco") had an important artistic workshop in the city of Viseu between 1515 and 1535.

In 1529–35, Miguel da Silva, Bishop of Viseu, commissioned five paintings from Fernandes to grace the side altars of Viseu Cathedral as well as its cloisters, to wit: this Saint Peter and a Baptism of Christ for the two chancel chapels (of the Epistle and Gospel side, respectively), a Calvary and Pentecost for the two transept chapels (sacred to the Blessed Sacrament, on the south semitransept, and the Holy Spirit, respectively), and a Saint Sebastian for a chapel dedicated to that saint, in the cloisters.

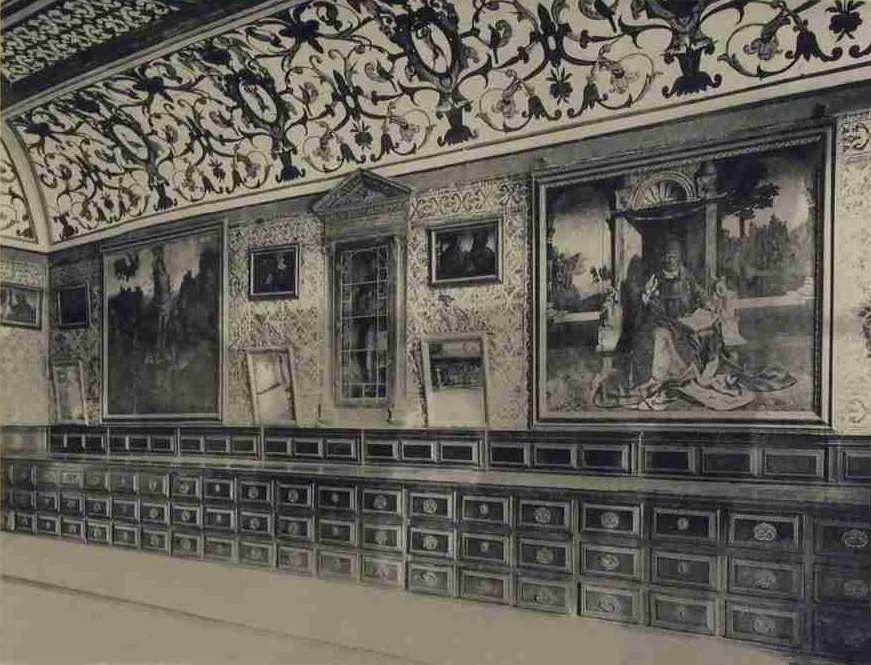
Photograph of the sacristy of Viseu Cathedral, c. 1907–8, showing the Saint Peter

The series of paintings underwent restoration in 1607, about 72 years after they were created. It is known that they were saved from overpainting due to the early recognition of their artistic value as an important part of the prestigious artist's corpus; this information was left in writing by canon Botelho Pereira in 1630. Out of the different paintings, and owing to its quality, Saint Peter was the most protected from alteration. When the cathedral was redecorated in keeping with Baroque tastes in the 1720s–30s, these paintings were moved to the sacristy: writings from 1758 (Diccionario Geographico), 1843 (Oliveira Bernardo), 1865 (John Charles Robinson), and 1890 (Joaquim de Vasconcelos) attest their permanence in this space for many decades.

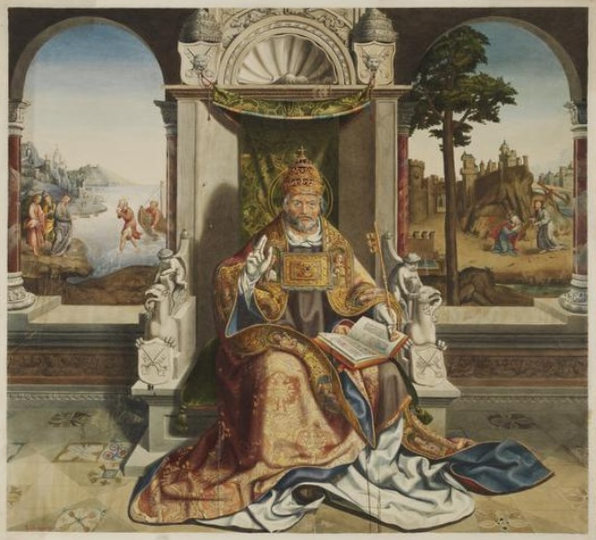
Watercolour copy of Saint Peter by Emilio Costantini, made for the Arundel Society (Victoria and Albert Museum)

In the 19th century, the work of Grão Vasco gained the attention of the Arundel Society, specifically the Saint Peter in Viseu Cathedral, recognised as a remarkable picture "of the greatest merit, but virtually unknown". In 1884, Arundel Society trustees Sir William Henry Gregory and Sir Austen Henry Layard submitted a request to Miguel Martins d'Antas, the Minister of Portugal in London, so the Portuguese government would allow an artist appointed by the Arundel Society to copy the painting (along with others in Viseu Cathedral and in the Hospital da Misericórdia, in Oporto) in order to produce and distribute chromolithograph prints of it; the authorisation was granted following the favourable opinion of the Civil Governor of Porto and of the Bishop of Viseu (José Dias Correia de Carvalho). The nearly insignificant number of works by non-Italian artists chosen to be reproduced makes it truly notable: Grão Vasco was put alongside the likes of Van Eyck, Memling, or Dürer. The artist chosen to copy the painting, Emilio Costantini, travelled to Viseu in 1887; the chromolithographs, by Wilhelm Greve, were published in 1892.

The Saint Peter was incorporated into the collections of the Grão Vasco National Museum, in Viseu; in 2006, it was classified as a National Treasure by the Ministry of Culture.
