= Costantini =

Costantini is an Italian surname. Notable people with the surname include:

- Alessandro Costantini (c.1581–1657), Italian Baroque composer
- Bartolomeo Costantini (1889–1941), Italian aviator and racing driver
- Celso Benigno Luigi Costantini (1876–1958), Italian cardinal
- Costantino Costantini, Italian politician and lawyer
- Dino Costantini
- Eduardo Costantini (born 1946), Argentine businessman
- Emilio Costantini
- Ermenegildo Costantini (1731–1791), Italian painter, active in Rome
- Fabrizio Costantini
- Flavio Costantini (1926–2013), Italian artist
- Francesco Costantini (1827–1899), Italian lawyer and politician
- Gianluca Costantini (born 1971), Italian cartoonist, artist, Comic journalist, and activist
- Humberto Costantini (1924–1987), Argentine writer and poet
- Isela Costantini (born 1971), Argentine politician and businesswoman
- Livia Nannini Costantini
- María Teresa Costantini (born 1949), Argentine actress
- Nicholas Costantini (born 1989), Italian football player
- Pierre Dominique Costantini (1889–1986), French soldier, journalist, writer and Bonapartist militant
- Tommaso Costantini (born 1996), Italian football player
