= Peso da Régua =

- Municipality
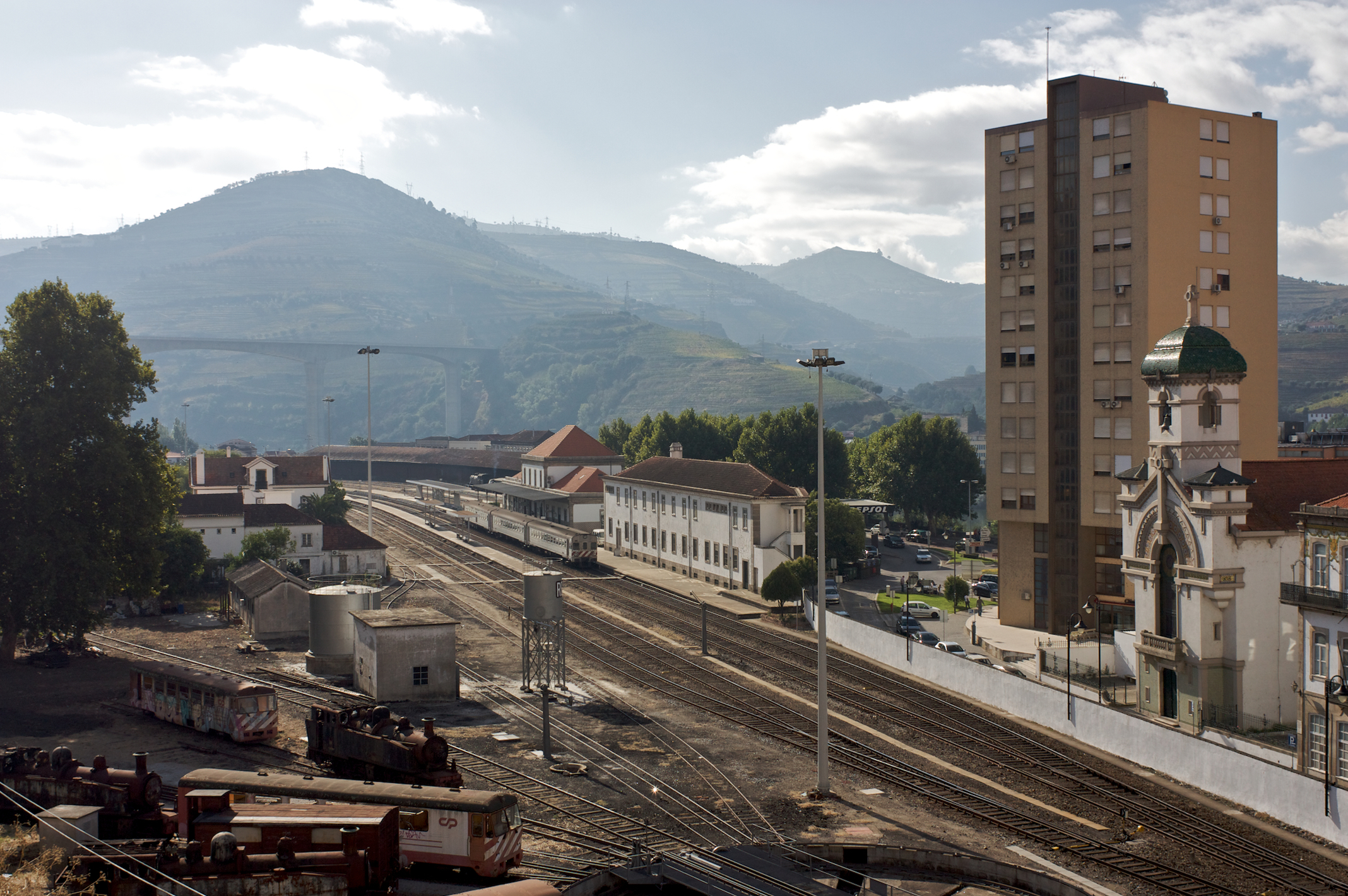
- The railway station in Peso da Régua

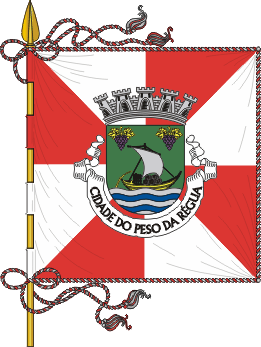
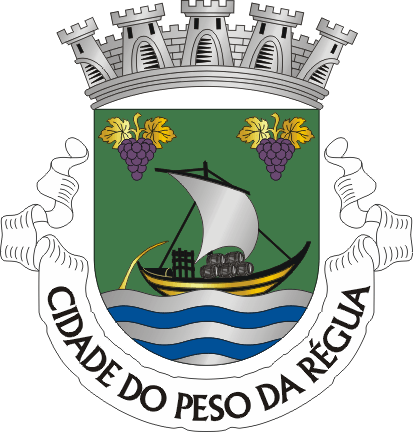
- Flag Coat of arms
- Interactive map of Peso da Régua
- Coordinates: 41°9′55″N 7°46′35″W
- Country: Portugal
- Region: Norte
- Intermunic. comm.: Douro
- District: Vila Real
- Parishes: 8

Government
  - President: José Manuel Gonçalves (PSD)

Area
  - Total: 94.86 km^{2} (36.63 sq mi)
- Elevation: 255 m (837 ft)

Population (2011)
  - Total: 17,131
  - Density: 180.6/km^{2} (467.7/sq mi)
- Time zone: UTC+00:00 (WET)
  - Summer (DST): UTC+01:00 (WEST)
- Postal code: 5054
- Area code: 254
- Website: www.cm-pesoregua.pt

Regua leads here. For American major general, see Eldon Regua

Peso da Régua (Portuguese pronunciation: [ˈpezu ðɐ ˈʁɛɣwɐ]), commonly known as Régua, is a city and municipality in northern Portugal, in the district of Vila Real. The population in 2011 was 17,131 (of which approximately 10,000 are in the town of Régua), in an area of 94.86 km^{2} (36.63 sq mi) km^{2}.

== History ==
Population of Peso da Régua (1849 - 2004)
Year	Pop.	±%
1849	9,202	—
1900	18,401	+100.0%
1930	20,612	+12.0%
1960	22,634	+9.8%
1981	22,472	−0.7%
1991	21,567	−4.0%
2001	18,832	−12.7%
2011	17,131	−9.0%

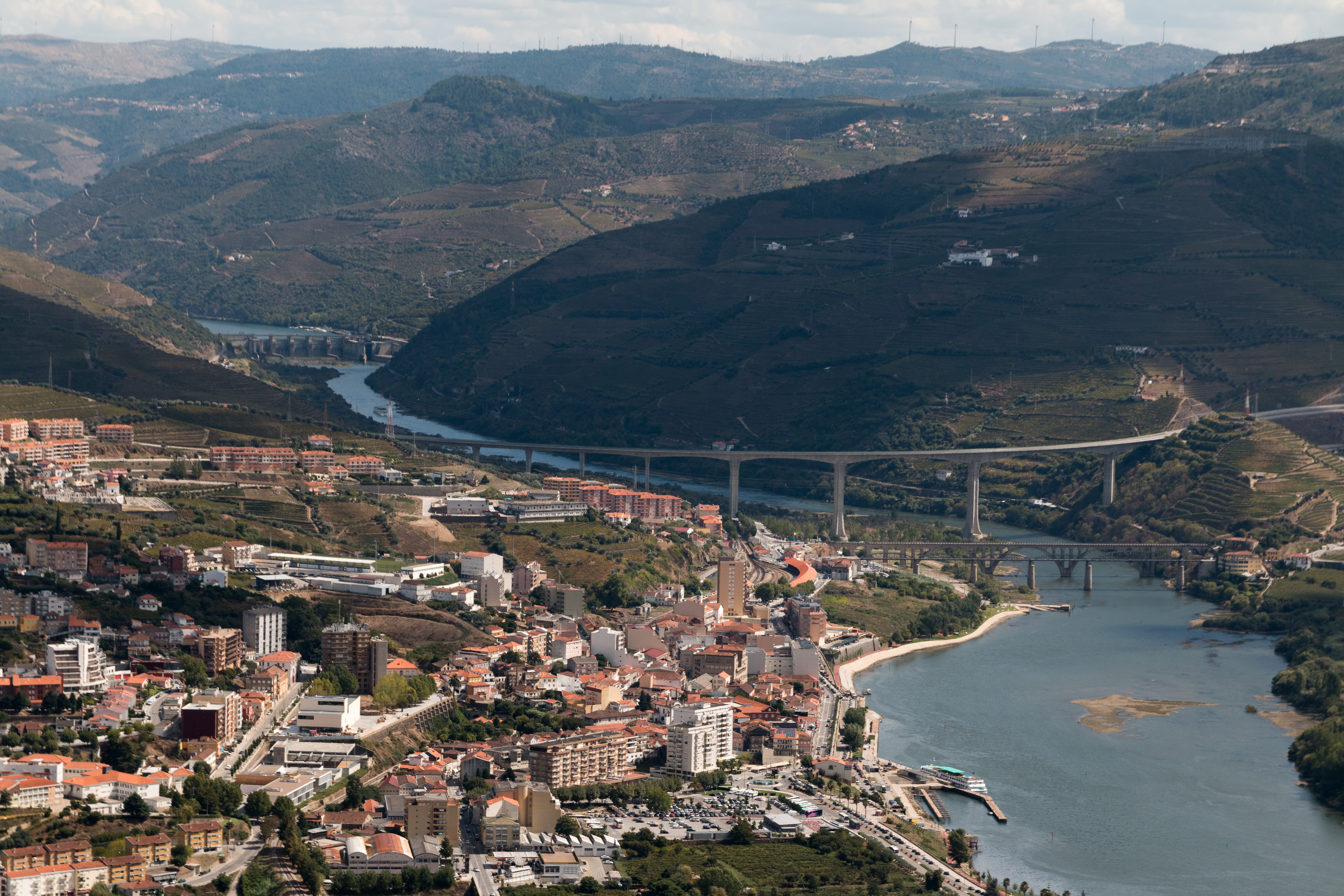
A historic train in the railway station of Peso da Régua

Historians have suggested that Peso da Régua was inhabited during the Roman, Suebi and Visigothic periods. There are competing theories over where the toponym "Peso da Régua" could have originated: Vila Reggula, the name of a Roman country estate; récua, a word for livestock, which may have crossed the Douro at this location; or reguengo a designation for lands that were owned by the crown. Peso da Régua could also have originated from the word regra (English: rule), alluding to the hereditary rights of descendants achieved through forals. This theory is based on the donation of lands by Counts Henrique and Hugo in 1093, which were transferred to Egas Moniz. It is possible that this rule gave origin to the word Régoa, and later Régua. In regards to the word, Peso (English: Weight), there are two hypothesis on its origin: the location being where goods were weighted and taxed; or the place where animals were fed (Portuguese: pensado), Penso

=== Middle Ages ===
Peso de Régua received its foral from King Sancho I, who conferred on the locality of Godim the municipal charter.

On 3 February 1837, Peso da Régua was elevated to the status of vila (English: town), which included the annexed municipality of Godim, the civil parishes of Godim, Loureiro, Fontelas, Moura Morta and Sedielos.

Its important role as municipality only achieved its zenith in 1836, after the Marquess of Pombal designated the Douro wine region, as a quality brand for export. This was helped through the creation of Companhia Geral das Vinhas do Alto Douro, in 1756, which delimited the vineyards of the Douro Valley by granite markers (Portuguese: Marcos de Feitora) to regulate the vineyards and wines produced. After this point, through commercialization and centralization, Régoa began to become the centre of the region.

On 31 December 1859, due to the extinction of the municipality of Canelas, the parishes of Poiares, Covelinhas, Vilarinho de Freires and Galafura were added to the municipality.

=== Republic ===
On 11 December 1933, the parish of Vinhos was created from the de-annexed region of Sedielos, resulting in a municipality of eleven parishes threaded along the Douro.

Within the integration of Canelas, in 1976, the municipality grew to twelve.

Peso da Régua became a city on 14 August 1985.

In 1988, the Office Internacional de la Vigne et du Vin recognized the municipality as the Cidade Internacional da Vinha e do Vinho (English: International City of Vine and Wine).

== Geography ==
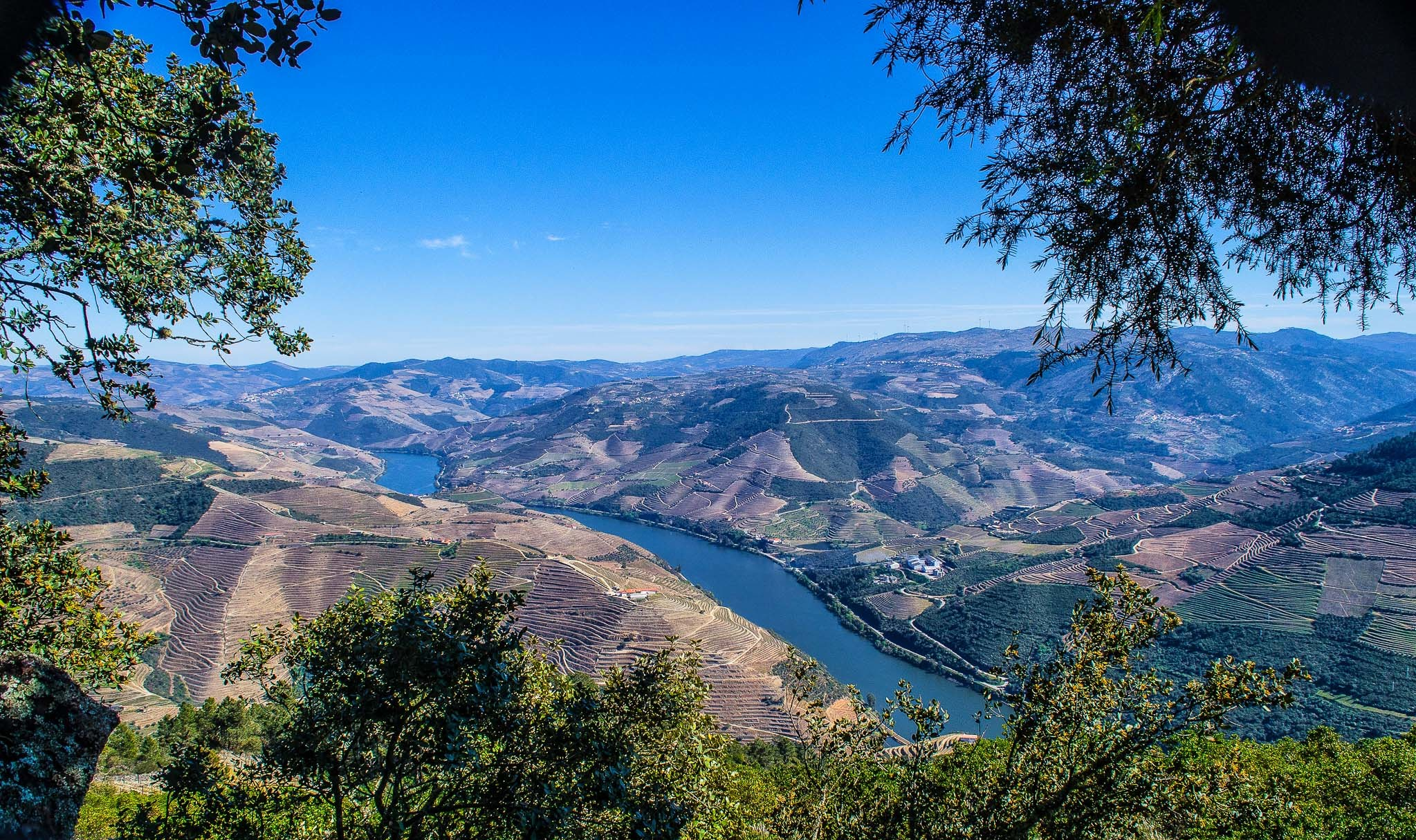
The Douro River valley running through the headlands of Peso da Régua

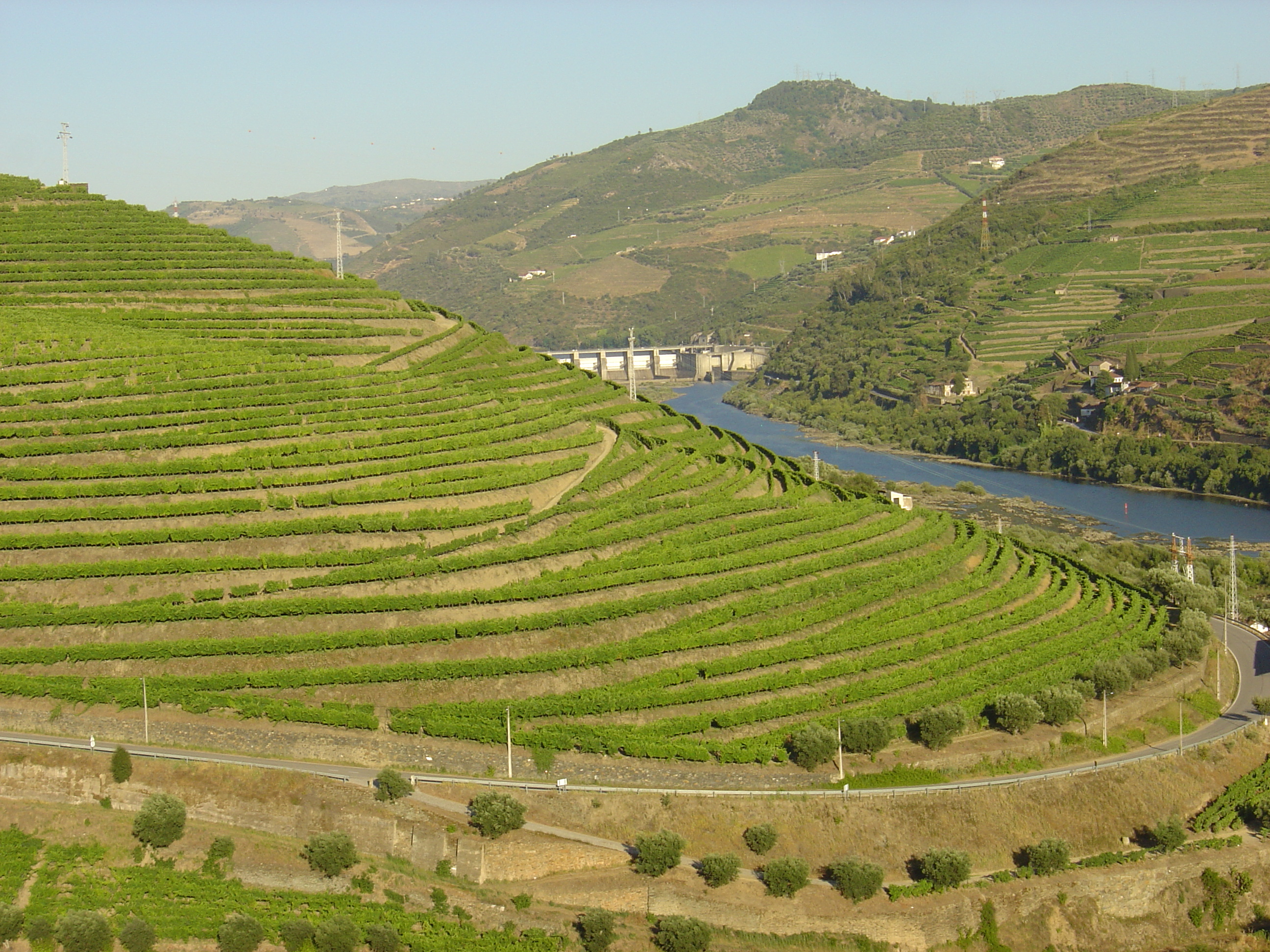
The terraced lands along the Douro River, with vineyards growing: the municipality was recognized as the International City of Vineyards and Wine in 1988

== Climate ==
Peso da Régua as a Mediterranean climate (Köppen: Csa) with hot, dry summers and cool to mild, wet winters. The average annual temperature is 22 °C (72 °F) during the day and 10 °C (50 °F) at night.

Climate data for Régua, 1971-2000 normals and extremes, 1961-1990 sunshine hours
Month	Jan	Feb	Mar	Apr	May	Jun	Jul	Aug	Sep	Oct	Nov	Dec	Year
Record high °C (°F)	19.5 (67.1)	24.5 (76.1)	29.0 (84.2)	33.0 (91.4)	35.5 (95.9)	39.5 (103.1)	42.8 (109.0)	41.5 (106.7)	40.0 (104.0)	34.5 (94.1)	26.0 (78.8)	25.5 (77.9)	42.8 (109.0)
Mean daily maximum °C (°F)	12.4 (54.3)	15.5 (59.9)	18.7 (65.7)	20.2 (68.4)	23.3 (73.9)	28.0 (82.4)	31.5 (88.7)	31.8 (89.2)	28.8 (83.8)	22.8 (73.0)	17.0 (62.6)	13.4 (56.1)	22.0 (71.5)
Daily mean °C (°F)	8.1 (46.6)	10.3 (50.5)	12.7 (54.9)	14.4 (57.9)	17.3 (63.1)	21.1 (70.0)	23.9 (75.0)	23.9 (75.0)	21.4 (70.5)	16.8 (62.2)	12.1 (53.8)	9.5 (49.1)	16.0 (60.7)
Mean daily minimum °C (°F)	3.8 (38.8)	5.1 (41.2)	6.6 (43.9)	8.6 (47.5)	11.2 (52.2)	14.3 (57.7)	16.3 (61.3)	15.9 (60.6)	14.0 (57.2)	10.8 (51.4)	7.3 (45.1)	5.6 (42.1)	10.0 (49.9)
Record low °C (°F)	−5.0 (23.0)	−3.5 (25.7)	−1.5 (29.3)	−2.5 (27.5)	2.6 (36.7)	6.0 (42.8)	9.5 (49.1)	8.5 (47.3)	4.0 (39.2)	−1.0 (30.2)	−2.0 (28.4)	−4.0 (24.8)	−5.0 (23.0)
Average rainfall mm (inches)	113.6 (4.47)	103.9 (4.09)	53.9 (2.12)	76.2 (3.00)	59.9 (2.36)	34.8 (1.37)	14.5 (0.57)	13.7 (0.54)	40.1 (1.58)	93.5 (3.68)	100.5 (3.96)	144.3 (5.68)	848.9 (33.42)
Average rainy days (≥ 0.1 mm)	13.5	11.6	10.0	12.2	11.3	6.6	3.2	2.8	6.7	11.7	11.9	14.1	115.6
Mean monthly sunshine hours	88	110	165	186	235	269	321	305	210	161	106	77	2,233
Source: Instituto de Meteorologia

Administratively, the municipality is divided into 8 civil parishes (freguesias):

- Fontelas
- Galafura e Covelinhas
- Loureiro
- Moura Morta e Vinhós
- Peso da Régua e Godim
- Poiares e Canelas
- Sedielos
- Vilarinho dos Freires

== Economy ==
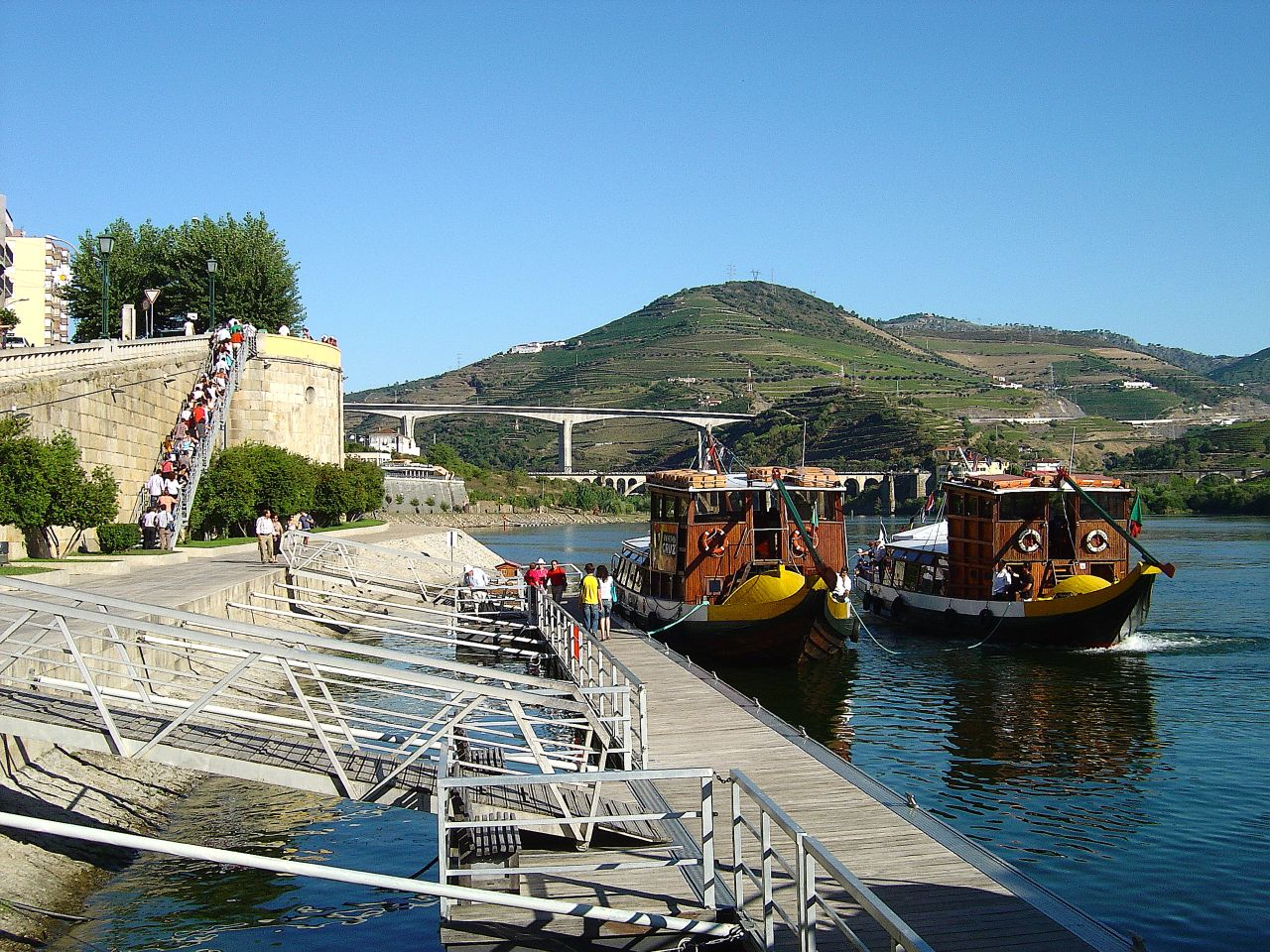

It cannot be expressed how important Port Wine helped to catapult the fortunes of Peso da Régua:

The mark founded in the landscape, in the lives of men and the system of relationships, more than its economic importance, to the region and the country, made the Port Wine a cultural fact, a Portuguese cultural patrimony, a universal wine. It is this generous wine, with singular characteristics, old, sweet and aromatic, completed centuries of experience, of work, of knowledge and art, of solidarity and conflicts. Complemented by nature, with united exceptional conditions on the flanks of schist along the Douro valley, the wine of Porto is, like many of the great wines, a human product. Of the Dourense, clearly, but also too the businessmen of Porto, the English, the poor of the Cold Lands of Trás-os-Montes and Beira, the careers of the people of Minho and Galicia...Here, in the demarcated region of wines, that are considered the oldest in the world (1756), in the contemporary sense a denomination of origin, the history of the peoples and vineyards advance, along the centuries and roads parallel.quote text

— Gaspar Martins Pereira, (2000) Memória do Rio. Para uma história da navegação no Douro. Edições Afrontamento. Porto

Tourist boats ply the river from this point carrying tourists through the locks of two dams to Régua. The town is also connected to Porto by train; the Douro railway line runs along the banks of the Douro. Until its closure in 2009, the narrow gauge railway of the Corgo line also served the town.

== Notable people ==
- Francisco da Silveira Pinto da Fonseca Teixeira, 1st Count of Amarante (1763–1821) a nobleman and Army officer.
- Antonia Ferreira (1811–1896) a businesswoman who lead the cultivation of port wine.
- João de Lemos (1819–1890) a Portuguese journalist, poet and dramatist.
- José Dias Correia de Carvalho (1830–1911) Portuguese bishop of Santiago de Cabo Verde and Viseu.
- Manuel Vieira de Matos (1861–1932) was Bishop of Guarda & Archbishop of Braga.
- Domingos Duarte Lima (born 1955) a lawyer, politician, musician, organist and singer. He faces charges of murder, fraud and money laundering.
