= Emilio Costantini =

Italien painter

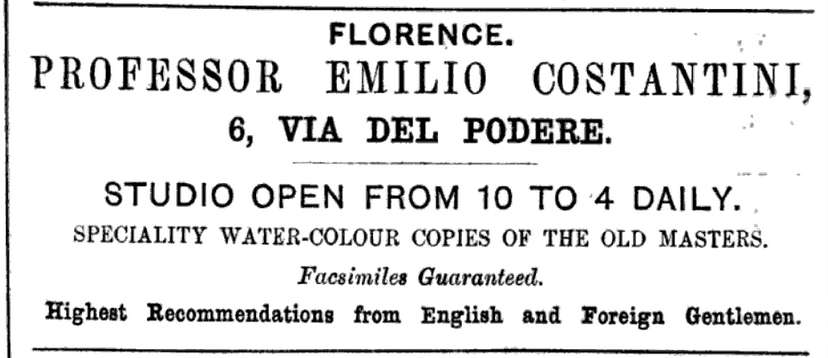
Advertisement for Costantini's Old Master reproductions, "Handbook for Lancashire", 1880

Emilio Costantini (1842–1926) was an Italian painter, a prominent art dealer, and a professor in the Istituto d'Arte di Firenze. Established in Florence, he was originally from Genzano di Roma.

Costantini was in regular contact with important art dealers of the time, such as Herbert P. Horne and Bernard Berenson; notably, through Berenson, he sold Raphael's Portrait of Tommaso Inghirami to Isabella Stewart Gardner in 1898. The correspondence between Berenson and Gardner reveals that, initially, the former had little confidence in the honesty of Emilio Costantini and his son and collaborator David Costantini ("I warn you that more and more impudently do the Italian dealers trade in forgeries, and the greatest of this ring are the Costantinis"), but this opinion was later reconsidered. He was also in contact with important London-based dealers such as Edgar Vincent and Walter Dowdeswell.

Costantini was well-regarded in London society as an artist who specialised in copies of old oil paintings. From 1888 to 1891, he produced fourteen watercolour copies of important masterpieces, mostly Italian, for the Arundel Society. In 1887, he travelled to Viseu, Portugal, to make one such copy, of Grão Vasco's Saint Peter.
