= José Xavier de Cerveira e Sousa =

Portuguese prelate, bishop and professor

- Bishop of Viseu
- Diocese: Roman Catholic Diocese of Viseu
- In office: 1862–1882
- Predecessor: D. José (III) Manuel de Lemos
- Successor: D. António (IV) Alves Martins

Personal details
- Born: 27 November 1797; Mogofores, Portugal
- Died: 15 March 1862 (aged 64); Mogofores, Portugal

José Xavier de Cerveira e Sousa (27 November 1797 – 15 March 1862) was a Portuguese prelate, bishop and professor at the University of Coimbra, he was bishops of Funchal, Beja and Viseu.

== Biography ==
He was born in the town of Mogofores.

=== Bishop of Funchal ===
He was confirmed with the Bishop of Funchal on 14 June 1842, he was ordinated as bishop on 2 June 1844 and confirmed as Bishop of Funchal later on July 8 and succeeded D. Francisco José Rodrigues de Andrade. He became its 22nd bishop and governed the diocese for nearly four years. It faced a serious religious crisis that time which surrounded that society, namely the Protestant proselyte made by Dr. Robert Kalley. D. Manuel (II) Martins Manso became bishop afterwards.

=== Bishop of Beja ===
He was transferred to the Diocese of Beja on the Portuguese mainland on 18 April 1849 and was confirmed with a bull of Pope Pius IX Romani Pontificis, on 28 September, he succeeded D. Manuel Pires de Azevedo Loureiro. Under a proxy of 28 January 1850, he ordered Dr. Lobo Pimetel to take possession of the Beian Diocese which had the parish on 15 February. After the death of Dr. Lobo Pimentel, he went to Lisbon for a provision where he named Father João Baptista da Silva vicar general. A few months later on 10 August, he made a pastoral greeting of its diocesans, entering Beja on 18 August. For ten more years, he was pontificate of the diocese of Beja, he was later transferred to become Bishop of Viseu. The post of the Bishop of Beja was shortly taken by D. José António da Mata e Silva.

=== Bishop of Viseu ===
On 7 December 1859, he was transferred to become bishop of Viseu after succeeding D. José (III) Manuel de Lemos, he resigned from his chair and abandoned the Diocese as he was incapable to offer obedience to its fathers in material of clerical vestments, he was succeeded by D. António (IV) Alves Martins. He returned to his house in Mogofores, he later died there in March 1862.

Catholic Church titles
| Preceded by D. Francisco José Rodrigues de Andrade | Bishop of Funchal; 1844–1849 | Succeeded by D. Manuel (II) Martins Manso |
| Preceded by D. Manuel Pires de Azevedo Loureiro | Bishop of Beja; 1849–1859 | Succeeded by D. José António da Mata e Silva |
| Preceded by D. José (III) Manuel de Lemos | Bishop of Viseu; 1859–1862 | Succeeded by D. António (IV) Alves Martins |
