= José Dias Correia de Carvalho =

19th and 20th-century Portuguese Catholic bishop

His Most Revered Excellency D. José Dias Correia de Carvalho
- Bishop of Viseu
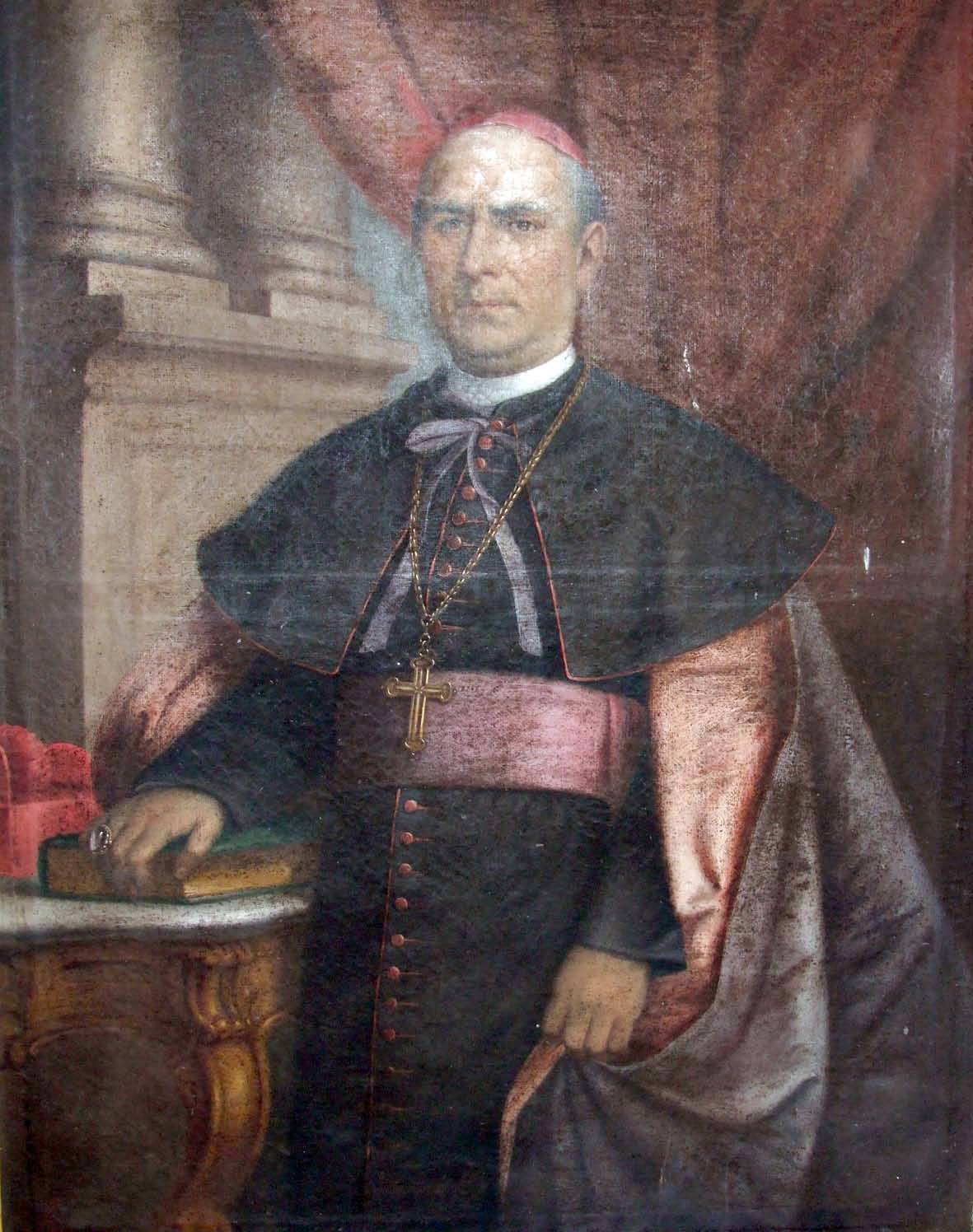
- Portrait of José Dias Correia de Carvalho (1889) by António José Pereira
- Archdiocese: Roman Catholic Diocese of Viseu
- Diocese: Roman Catholic Diocese of Santiago de Cabo Verde
- In office: 1883–1911
- Predecessor: D. António Alves Martins
- Successor: D. António Alves Ferreira dos Santos

Personal details
- Born: 19 December 1830; Peso da Regua, Portugal
- Died: 2 July 1911 (aged 80); Viseu, Portugal

José Dias Correia de Carvalho (19 December 1830 – 2 July 1911) was a Portuguese bishop, he was bishops of Santiago de Cabo Verde and Viseu.

== Biography ==
Carvalho went to the seminary in Gralhas (what was part of the Diocese of Porto, now it is in the Diocese of Vila Real), the seminary no longer exists today. He finished his studies at the University of Coimbra and was ordinated as priest on 10 June 1854.

From February 1865 until June 1871 Carvalho was pro-head of the Diocese of Beja which was vacant with the transfer of its bishop D. António da Trindade de Vasconcelos Pereira de Melo for the Diocese of Lamego in 1863 and had chosen not to accept in part of the Holy See for the probable successor D. João de Aguiar, he did not register on the news on the mandate with the pro-head vicar of that diocese.

Carvalho was nominated bishop of Diocese of Santiago de Cabo Verde and fully became on 3 September with the main head D. José Luís Alves, O.SS.T, bishop of Bragança and other bishops including Patrício Xavier de Moura (Bishop of Funchal) and D. José Lino de Oliveira (bishop of Angola and the Congo). He took the search between the dioceses on 5 January 1872. He became the 25th bishop since its creation in 1533 and the first bishop which visited all of its churches in the archipelago.

On 9 August 1882, Carvalho was nominated bishop of Viseu. He was mainly priest of the personal secretary of D. Manuel Vieira de Matos in 1889 and co-priest of the Patriarch of the Indias D. António Sebastião Valente in 1881 and D. António Tomás da Silva Leitão e Castro in 1883, future bishop of Lamego.

Catholic Church titles
Preceded by José Luis Alves Feijó	Bishop of Santiago de Cape Verde; 1871–1883	Succeeded by Joaquim Augusto de Barros
Preceded by António Alves Martins	Bishop of Viseu; 1883–1911	Succeeded by António Alves Ferreira dos Santos
