= Last Supper (Fernandes) =

Altarpiece by Grão Vasco Fernandes

- Última Ceia ou Instituição da Sagrada Eucaristia (Portuguese)
- Artist: Grão Vasco
- Year: 1535
- Medium: oil on canvas
- Dimensions: 151 cm × 201.5 cm (59 in × 79.3 in)
- Location: Grão Vasco Museum; Viseu

The Last Supper (Portuguese: Última Ceia ou Instituição da Sagrada Eucaristia) is an altarpiece by Grão Vasco Fernandes, from 1535.

== Description ==
The painting is an oil on canvas with overall dimensions of 151 x 201.5 centimeters. It is in the collection of the Grão Vasco Museum, in Viseu.

== Analysis ==
The triptych from the chapel of Santa Marta, of the ancient Archbishop's Palace at Fontelo, shows the Last Supper, with Judas leaving on the left panel.

It was selected as one of the ten most important artistic works in Portugal by the Europeana project.

== Sources ==
- K. J. P. Lowe (January 2000). Cultural Links Between Portugal and Italy in the Renaissance. Oxford University Press. ISBN 978-0-19-817428-8.
