= Manuel Martins Manso =

Portuguese bishop

- Bishop of Funchal
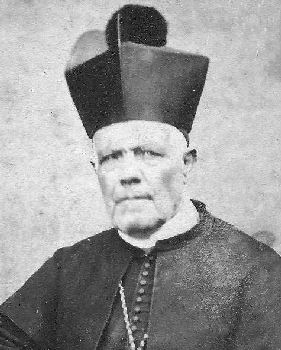
- D. Manuel Martins Manso when he was Bishop of Funchal
- Diocese: Roman Catholic Diocese of Funchal
- In office: 1849–1858
- Predecessor: D. José Xavier de Cerveira e Sousa
- Successor: D. Patrício Xavier de Moura

Personal details
- Born: 21 November 1793; Bemposta, Mogadouro, Portugal
- Died: 1 December 1871 (aged 78); Guarda, Portugal

This article uses the Portuguese naming customs, the maternal surname is Martins and the paternal surname is Manso

Manuel Martins Manso (21 November 1793 – 11 December 1871) was a Portuguese bishop, he was bishop of Funchal and of Guarda.

== Biography ==
He was born in the village of Bemposta in the Mogadouro Municipality near its municipal seat in Trás-os-Montes and Alto Douro.

He was nominated Bishop of Funchal, a diocese that includes Madeira and its surrounding islands in 1849 and remained until 1858 amid serious clerical and social upheavals, the post was later taken by D. Patrício Xavier de Moura. He returned to Continental Portugal and after resigning as bishop of Funchal for health reasons and on 18 March became the Guarda later in 1850 up to his death in 1871, afterwards the seat was vacant until 1878 where it was taken by D. Tomás. Gomes de Almeida.

He was the great nephew of the 1st Viscount of Vale Pereiro.

Catholic Church titles
Preceded by D. José Xavier de Cerveira e Sousa	Bishop of Funchal; 1849–1858	Succeeded by D. Patrício Xavier de Moura
Preceded by D. Joaquim José Pacheco Sousa	Bishop of Guarda; 1849–1859	Succeeded by D. Tomás Gomes de Almeida
