= João de Lemos =

Portuguese journalist, poet, and dramatist

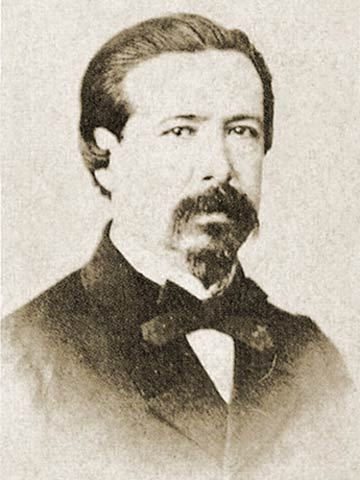
- Born: João de Lemos Seixas Castelo Branco; 1819; Peso da Régua, Portugal
- Died: 1890 (aged 70–71)
- Occupations: Journalist, Poet and Dramatist

João de Lemos Seixas Castelo Branco (1819–1890) was a Portuguese journalist, poet and dramatist.

Lemos was born in Peso da Régua. He was known as "the troubadour" (in Portuguese: Trovador) in Coimbra, where he graduated in law, thanks the publication of the poetic newspaper O Trovador (repository of poetic productions of a group of young students). Besides João, director of that publication, were part of The Troubadour: Luís da Costa Pereira, António Xavier Rodrigues Cordeiro, José Freire de Serpa, Augusto Lima and Couto Monteiro.

João collaborated with other periodicals, as exemplified by the comedy newspaper The Comedy Portuguese (in Portuguese: a Comédia Portuguesa), where he started publishing in 1888.

== Poetic works ==
- The funeral and the dove: Poem in 5 corners (Portuguese: O funeral e a pomba: poema em 5 cantos)
- Songbook (1858–1867) (Portuguese: Cancioneiro)
  - I - Flowers and Lovers (Portuguese: Flores e Amores)
  - II - Faith and Fatherland (Portuguese: Religião e Pátria)
  - III - Impressions and Recollections (Portuguese: Impressões e Recordações)
- Elisa's book: Fragments (1869) (Portuguese: O livro de Elisa: fragmentos)
- Songs Afternoon (1875) (Portuguese: Canções da tarde)
- Evenings Village (1876) (Portuguese: Serões de Aldeia)
- Uncle Damian: lyric (1886) (Portuguese: O tio Damião: poema lírico)
- Monk Painter (1889) (Portuguese: O Monge Pintor)

== Theater ==
- Maria Pais Ribeira: drama in four acts (Portuguese: Maria Pais Ribeira: drama em quatro actos)
- A happy shock: comedy (Portuguese: Um susto feliz: comédia)

== Compilation of newspaper articles ==
- The Friars (Portuguese: Os Frades)
- He and She (Portuguese: Ele e Ela)
- The Inquisition of 1850 (Portuguese: A Inquisição de 1850)
