= António Alves Martins =

His Most Reverend Excellency, Dom António Alves Martins
- Bishop of Viseu
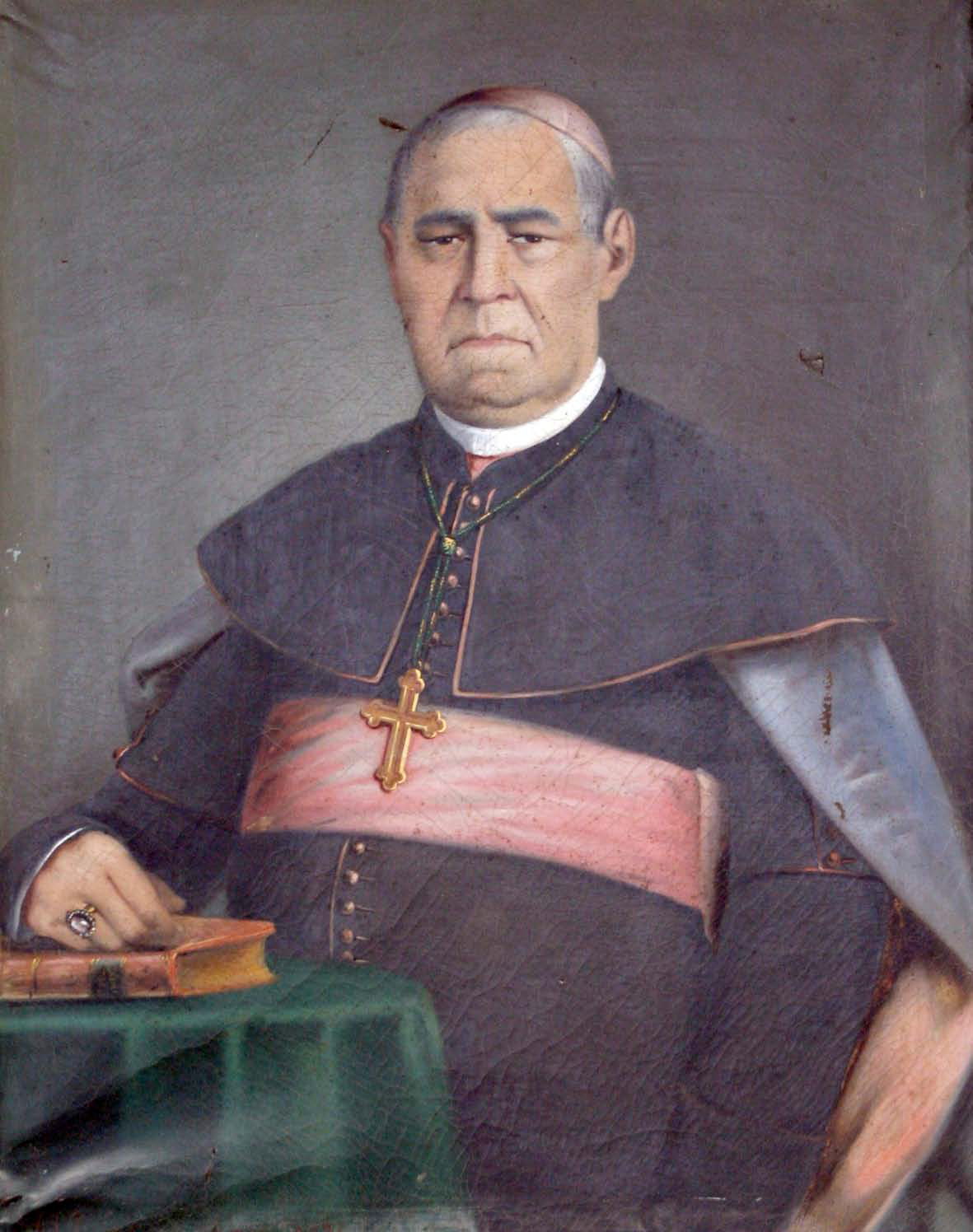
- Diocese: Roman Catholic Diocese of Viseu
- In office: 1862–1882
- Predecessor: José Xavier de Cerveira e Sousa
- Successor: José Dias Correia de Carvalho

Personal details
- Born: 18 February 1808 Alijó, Portugal
- Died: 2 May 1882 (aged 74) Viseu, Portugal

António Alves Martins (18 February 1808 – 5 February 1882) was a Portuguese bishop, professor, journalist and politician, he was bishop of Viseu.

== Biography ==
He joined the Order of St. Francis at age 16, he later went to the University of Coimbra. In 1828, he was expelled, having been accused for the participation of the Porto Liberal Liberation that took place on 16 May.

He headed Jornal Nacional from 1848 to 1849. In 1852, he became a university professor and in 1862 Bishop of Viseu.

He was also leader of the Reformist Party from 1868 to 1869. Later he was appointed "Minister to the King" (Interior Minister) in the same year and in 1870.

He later lived in Viseu where he remained until his death at the Fontelo Palace, the old Episcopal Palace in the same diocese.

A statue is named in his honor in Viseu.

== Bibliography ==
- D. Antonio Alves Martins, Bispo de vizeu, Esboço biographico, by Camillo Castello Branco, Ernesto Chardron International Library (LUGAN & GENELIOUX, successores), Porto, 1889] (in Portuguese)

Catholic Church titles
Preceded by José Xavier de Cerveira e Sousa	Bishop of Viseu; 1862–1886	Succeeded by José Dias Correia de Carvalho
Political offices
Preceded by Count of Ávila	Minister and Secretary of State to the King; 1868–1869	Succeeded by Duke of Loulé
Preceded by Viscount de Seabra	Minister and Secretary of Justice (Interim); 1868	Succeeded by António Pequito Seixas de Andrade
Preceded by António Pequito Seixas de Andrade	Minister and Secretary of Justice (Interim); 1869	Succeeded by António Pequito Seixas de Andrade
Preceded by José Dias Ferreira	Minister and Secretary of State to the King; 1870	Succeeded by Carlos Bento da Silva (Interim)
Preceded by Carlos Bento da Silva; Interim	Minister and Secretary of State to the King (Interim); 1870–1871	Succeeded by Marquis of Ávila started as interim
Preceded by Marquis of Ávila	Minister of Justice (Interim); 1870	Succeeded by Augusto Saraiva de Carvalho
Preceded by António da Costa	Minister of Secretary of Public Instructions; 1870	Succeeded by Carlos Bento da Silva; Interim
Preceded by Carlos Bento da Silva	Minister of Education; 1870	Succeeded by João Arroio in 1890
