= Grão Vasco National Museum =

Coordinates: 40°39′36.55″N 7°54′39.70″W

Grão Vasco Museum
- Museu de Grão Vasco
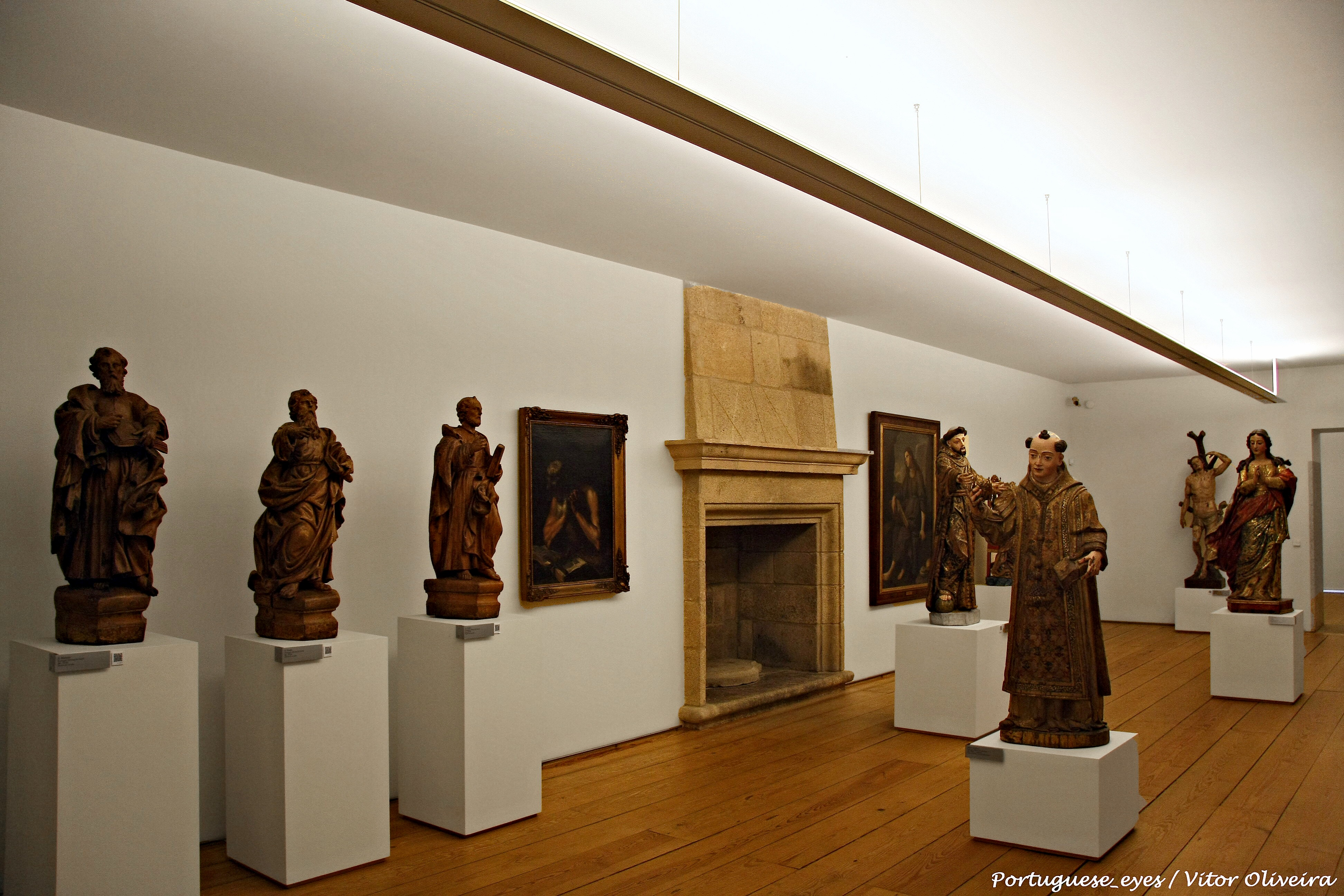
- Established: 1916
- Location: Viseu, Portugal
- Type: Art museum

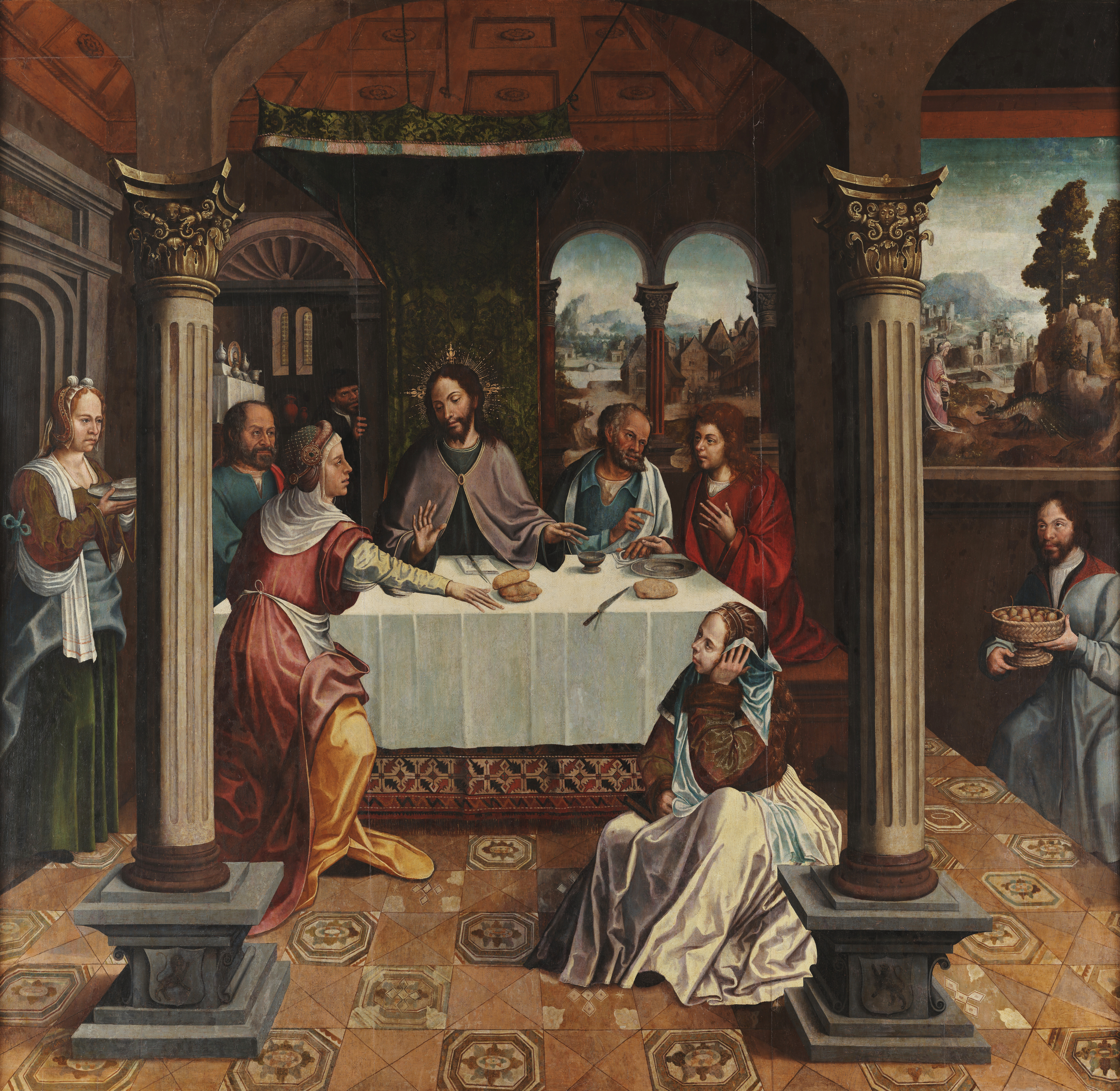
Jesus in the House of Marta (c. 1535), by Vasco Fernandes, now in the Grão Vasco Museum.

The Grão Vasco Museum (Museu de Grão Vasco) is an art museum located in the city of Viseu, in Portugal. The museum is named after one of the most important Portuguese painters of the Renaissance, Vasco Fernandes (also known as the Grão Vasco), who had his workshop in Viseu.

The museum, founded in 1916, occupies the building of the old Seminary, located beside Viseu Cathedral. The building, began in the late 16th century in Mannerist style, has had its interior recently modernised by Porto architect Eduardo Souto de Moura.

The main exhibits of the museum are the painted altarpieces executed for Viseu Cathedral during the Renaissance. These include the main altarpiece, executed by a workshop that included the young Vasco Fernandes and was apparently led by Francisco Henriques, as well as later altarpieces by a mature Vasco Fernandes (including the Last Supper triptych) and his collaborator, Gaspar Vaz. The artistic significance of these altarpieces turn the Grão Vasco Museum into one of the most important art museums in Portugal.

The collections also include metalwork, tapestry and sculpture.
