= Ermenegildo Costantini =

Italian painter

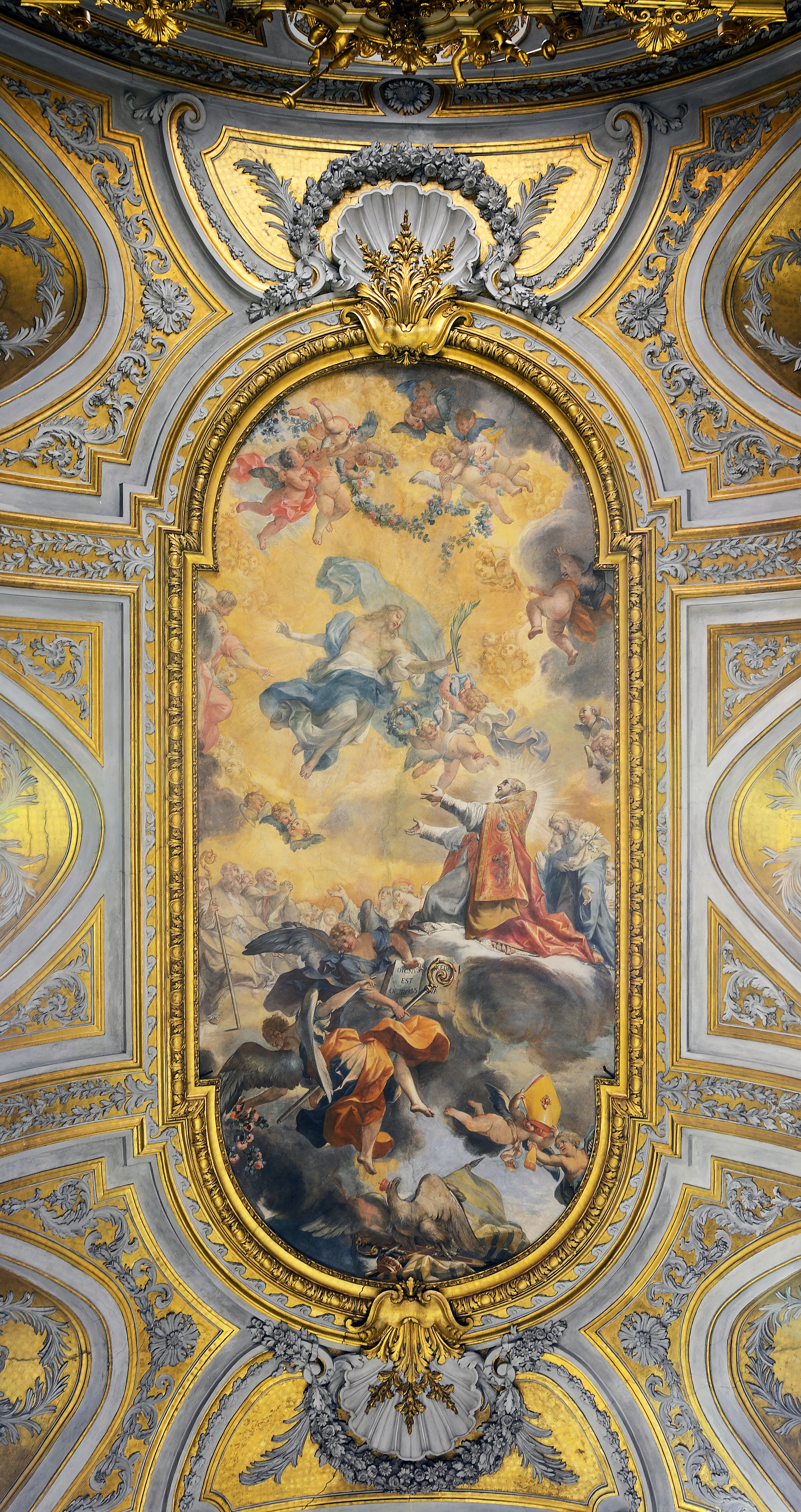
The glory of San Stanislao in Rome

Ermenegildo Costantini (1731–1791) was an Italian painter, active in Rome in a late-Baroque style.

== Biography ==
He was a pupil of Marco Benefial. He painted frescoes at the Chapel of the SS Sacramento at Velletri, and at the gallery of the Palazzo Antici in Recanati. He returned to Rome in 1791 after an earthquake at Recanati. He made an altarpiece of with a copy of a San Nicola da Tolentino by Raphael, now in the Pinacoteca Comunale of Città di Castello.
