= Manuel Vieira de Matos =

Portuguese Bishop

D. Manuel Vieira de Matos.jpg
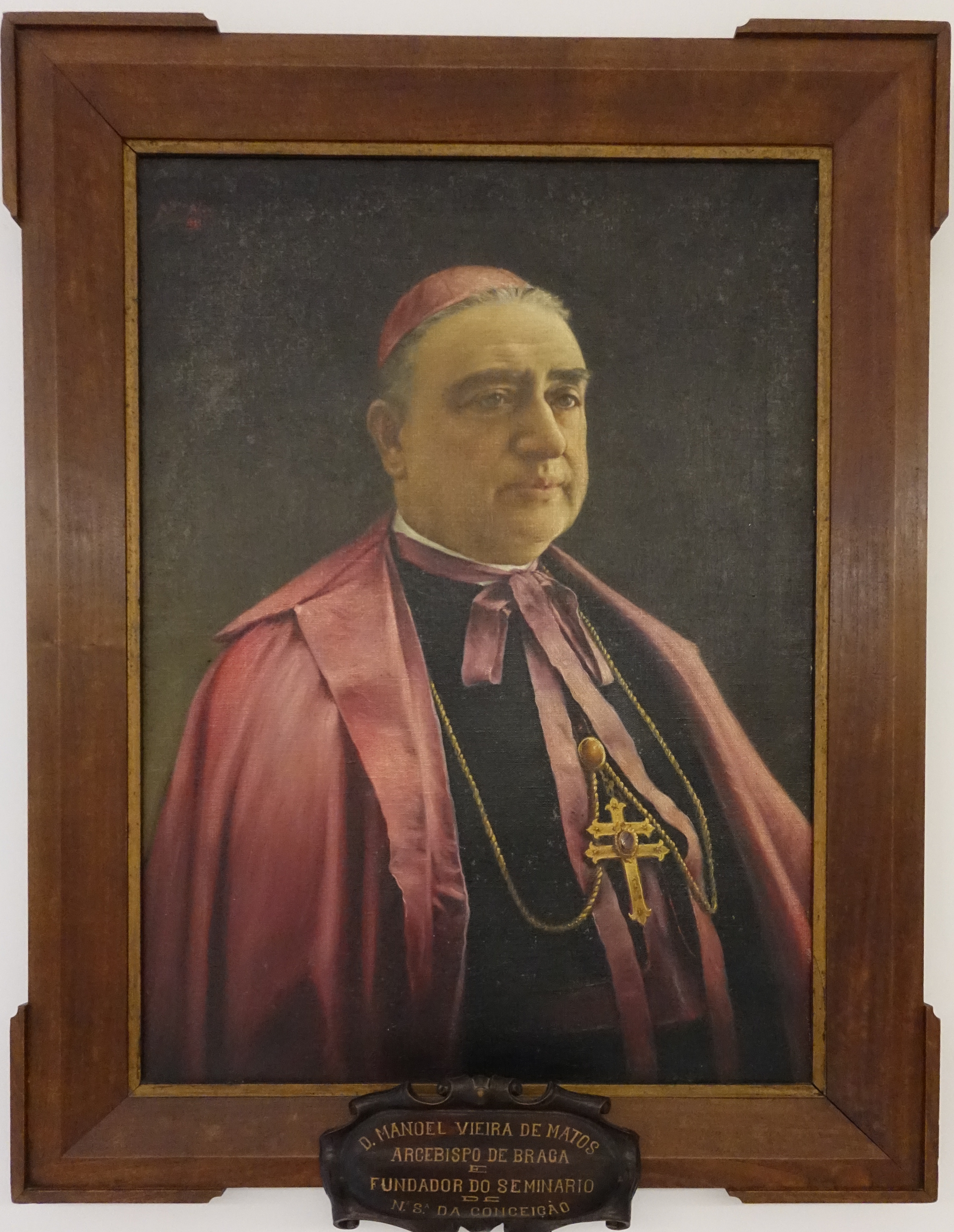
- Manuel Vieira de Matos
- Born: 22 March 1861; Poiares, Peso da Régua, Portugal
- Died: 28 September 1932 (aged 71); Braga, Portugal
- Employer(s): Roman Catholic Diocese of Guarda; Roman Catholic Archdiocese of Braga

Manuel Vieira de Matos (22 March 1861 – 28 September 1932) was Bishop of Guarda, Archbishop of Braga, and the founder of the Corpo Nacional de Escutas - Escutismo Católico Português.

He was born in Poiares, Peso da Régua. On 1 April 1903 he became the Bishop of Guarda, and on 1 October 1914 he became Archbishop of Braga.

In Braga in 1923, Manuel Vieira de Matos and Dr. Avelino Gonçalves founded the largest Scouting organization in Portugal, the Corpo Nacional de Escutas - Escutismo Católico Português (CNE). In 1929 the organization was accepted as member by the World Scout Bureau. He died in Braga, Portugal.

Preceded by Tomás Gomes de Almeida	Bishop of Guarda; 1903–1914	Succeeded by José Alves Mattoso
Preceded by Manuel Baptista da Costa	Roman Catholic Archdiocese of Braga; 1914–1932	Succeeded by António Bento Martins Júnior
