= Tommaso Costantini =

Italian footballer

Personal information
- Date of birth: 23 June 1996 (age 30)
- Place of birth: Pesaro, Italy
- Height: 1.83 m (6 ft 0 in)
- Position: Forward

Team information
- Current team: AC Sammaurese

Youth career
- –2015: Cesena
- 2013–2014: → Vis Pesaro (loan)
- 2014: → Rimini (loan)
- 2014–2015: → Carpi (loan)

Senior career*
Years	Team	Apps	(Gls)
2013–2014	Cesena	0	(0)
2013–2014	→ Vis Pesaro (loan)	4	(0)
2015–2016	Vis Pesaro	6	(0)
2016–2017	Mezzolara	15	(4)
2017–2019	SPAL	0	(0)
2017–2018	→ Juve Stabia (loan)	6	(0)
2018	→ Ravenna (loan)	5	(0)
2019	Massese	9	(3)
2019–	AC Sammaurese	13	(8)
- * Club domestic league appearances and goals as of 22:54, 21 December 2019 (UTC)

Tommaso Costantini (born 23 June 1996) is an Italian football player who plays for Serie D club AC Sammaurese.

== Club career ==
He made his Serie C debut for Juve Stabia on 26 August 2017 in a game against Fidelis Andria.
