= Fabrizio Costantini =

San Marino football manager

Personal information
- Date of birth: 3 June 1968 (age 58)
- Place of birth: San Marino

Managerial career
- Years: Team
- –2013: Fiorentino
- 2013–2016: Juvenes/Dogana
- 2016–2017: Murata
- 2017–2021: San Marino U21
- 2021–2023: San Marino

Fabrizio Costantini (born 3 June 1968) is a Sammarinese football manager.

== Playing career ==
During his playing career Costantini played for Sammarinese clubs Juvenes/Dogana, Tre Penne, Cosmos, and San Giovanni in addition to Italian clubs.

== Managerial career ==
In San Marino Costantini managed Fiorentino, Juvenes/Dogana, and Murata. He led Juvenes/Dogana to the final of the 2014–15 Campionato Sammarinese di Calcio.

On 23 February 2017, he was appointed coach of the San Marino national Under-21 team. On 28 November 2021, he replaced Franco Varrella as manager of the senior national team. He made his debut on the bench of the Titans on 25 March 2022 against Lithuania in a friendly, suffering a defeat (1-2 for the Baltic national team).

In November 2021 following the departure of Franco Varrella, Costantini was named manager of the San Marino national team. He was coming off of a four-year stint as manager of San Marino's national under-21 side.

On 12 December 2023, the San Marino Federation announced in a statement that it had not renewed Costantini's contract, who therefore concluded his experience at the helm of the Titans with two draws (both obtained in the autumn of 2022, in as many friendly matches against the national teams of Seychelles and Saint Lucia) and 17 defeats out of 19 official matches. In the last three matches of his management, valid for the Euro 2024 qualifiers, despite not obtaining any points, the San Marino national team always scored, which is an unprecedented event in the history of the San Marino representative.

== Playing style ==
Fabrizio Costantini's preferred formation is 5-3-2.

== Managerial statistics ==
As of match played 20 November 2023

| Team | From | To | Record | | | | |
| Team | From | To | G | W | D | L | Win % |
|---|---|---|---|---|---|---|---|
| San Marino | November 2021 | 12 December 2023 | 20 | 0 | 2 | 18 | 0.00 |
