= Diocese of Viseu =

Roman Catholic diocese in Portugal

Diocese of Viseu Dioecesis Visensis Diocese de Viseu

Catholic
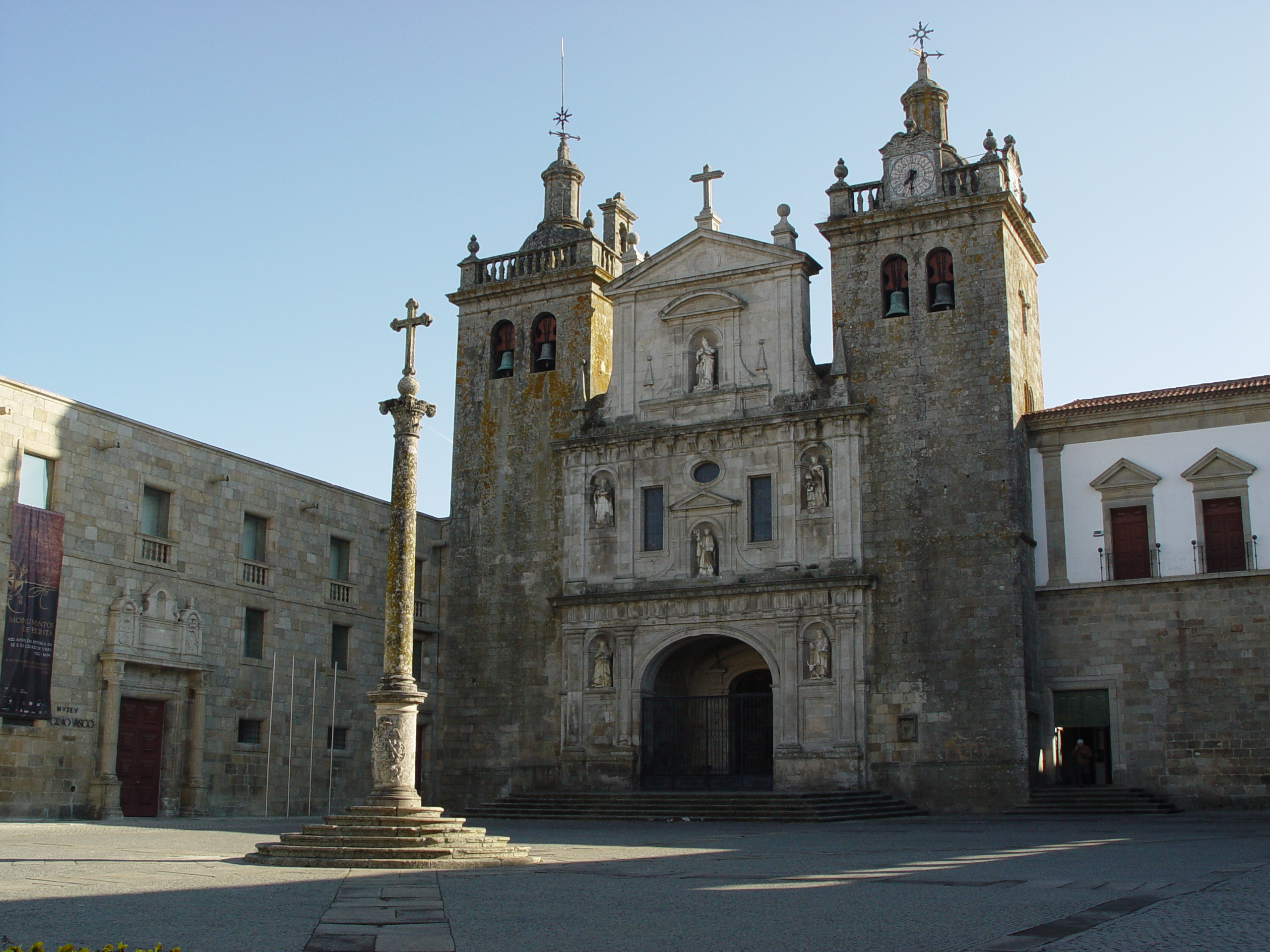
- Viseu Cathedral

Location
- Country: Portugal
- Ecclesiastical province: Braga
- Metropolitan: Archdiocese of Braga

Statistics
- Area: 3,400 km^{2} (1,300 sq mi)
- Population: Total; Catholics: (as of 2010); 270,000; 261,700 (96.9%)

Information
- Denomination: Roman Catholic
- Sui iuris church: Latin Church
- Rite: Roman Rite
- Established: 572
- Cathedral: Viseu Cathedral
- Patron saint: St Theotonius

Current leadership
- Pope: Leo XIV
- Bishop: António Luciano dos Santos Costa
- Metropolitan Archbishop: Jorge IV

Map
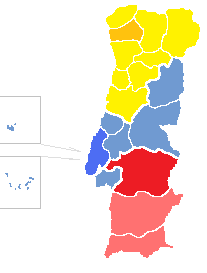
- The Ecclesiastical Province of Braga (orange and yellow) includes the Diocese of Viseu.

Website
- Website of the Diocese

The Diocese of Viseu (Latin: Dioecesis Visensis) is a Latin Church diocese of the Catholic church in Portugal. It is a suffragan of the archdiocese of Braga. Its episcopal seat is in Viseu Cathedral in the Centro Region. The current bishop is António Luciano dos Santos Costa.

== History ==
The see at Viseu dates from the sixth century and including the doubtful prelates, and those elected but not confirmed, it has had eighty- three bishops. The list begins with Remissol (572-585) who attended the Second Council of Braga, but was exiled by the Arian King Leovigild. Tunila succeeded him and abjured Arianism at the Third Council of Toledo; bishops of Viseu were present at the fourth, sixth, eighth, twelfth, and thirteenth councils of Toledo.

There was a vacancy of fifteen years from 665 to 680; Theofredo was bishop in 693. Then, following the Muslim conquest, Viseu remained without a bishop for nearly two centuries. Theodomiro assisted at the consecration of the church of Santiago de Compostela in 876, and at the Council of Oviedo in 877 and was followed by Gundemiro in 905. In this century Vizseu was under Islamic rule for 76 years, and at first had no bishop, but afterwards its prelates, Gomes and Sisnando (1020-1064), resided in Oviedo. From 1110 to 1144 the diocese was governed by priors appointed by the bishops of Coimbra, in virtue of a Bull of Pope Paschal II; among them was Saint Theotonius, afterwards patron of the city. The line of bishops began again with Odorio.

Nicolau (1192), a future canon regular, studied in Paris and there met the future Pope Innocent III, who after his election to the papacy received him at Rome and recommended him to the queen for his learning and modesty. Martinho was appointed in 1230; after his death the see remained vacant until 1250, when Pedro Gonçalves was confirmed in it. Matheus I (1254) took part in the long conflicts between Crown and Church, which had begun in the reign of King Afonso II, and in defence of ecclesiastical immunities went with other bishops to Rome, dying at Viterbo. After eight years, during which Portugal was under interdicts, Matheus II filled the see, and he was followed by Egas I (1259), an active reformer, and Martinho II (1313). This prelate carried out important work in the cathedral, which dates at least from 830, when King Ferdinand the Great recaptured the city from the Moors; it was almost reconstructed early in the twelfth century. Gonçalo de Figueiredo (1323), who had been married before entering Church service, is remembered as the founder of many noble families; his successor Miguel Vivas (1330) served as chancellor to Afonso IV.

After João III (1375), "of good memory", came two prelates, Pedro II and João IV, whose rule was brief on account of the Great Schism, the former being deposed by Pope Urban VI. A fifth João followed in the see in 1392 and, being highly esteemed by the king, was chosen godfather of Prince Henry the Navigator, and received from the monarch the gift of a Roman tower for the cathedral bells. Luís do Amaral, the only bishop native of the city, represented Portugal at the Council of Basel, and, embracing the cause of the antipope Felix V, was sent on various embassies; he returned however to the lawful obedience before his death.

Luís Coutinho II (1438) was promoted to the diocese of Coimbra in 1446, being followed by João Vicente (founder of the Loyos, a congregation of secular canons of St. John), who was known as "the holy bishop". He reformed the Order of Christ and gave it new statutes by order of Prince Henry, Duke of Viseu, the grand-master. Cardinal d'Alpedrinha, the richest and most influential of Portuguese prelates, lived at Rome from 1479 and dying there in 1508 was buried in his splendid chapel in Santa Maria del Popolo.

Diego Ortiz de Villegas (1507), a Castilian, was confessor of three kings and renowned as a theologian, orator, and astrologer. He took part in the Junta called by King Manuel to consider the offer Christopher Columbus had made to discover the sea route to the Indies by sailing west and procured its rejection, which transferred from Portugal to Spain the European discovery of America. He built a new and splendid front to the cathedral and consecrated it in June, 1516.

In 1520, at the age of eleven, Cardinal-Infante Afonso, sixth son of King Manuel I, became Bishop-elect of Viseu. He had a papal dispensation to hold the diocese while below the canonical age for consecration, but it is not known when he was consecrated, or by whom. He did consecrate his brother, Henrique, on 13 April 1539. In his time, books began to be kept for the registration of births, deaths, and marriages, a custom afterwards enjoined by the Council of Trent. He was followed, among others, by Cardinal Miguel da Silva (1527), and Cardinal Alessandro Farnese (1547), who never came to the diocese of which he was the Administrator, a function he resigned in 1552.

Gonçalo Pinheiro (appointed in Consistory by Pope Julius III on June 27, 1552), classical scholar, ambassador to France, and subsequently bishop, held a synod in 1555, and made notable additions to the cathedral. He died in November 1557. Jorge de Ataíde (appointed on 23 July 1568) assisted at the Council of Trent and in the reform of the Missal and Breviary and built the cathedral sacristy and part of the bishop's palace; of noble family and a pious prelate, he refused four archbishoprics and left his residuary estate to the poor.

Miguel de Castro (1579), also a noble, was Viceroy of Portugal during the Philippine Dynasty, and renowned for almsdeeds. On his transfer to the archdiocese of Lisbon, Nuno de Noronha, son of the Count of Odemira, became bishop (1585) and built the seminary, doing the same for the diocese of Guarda to which he was promoted. He was a notable reformer of the clergy, and lived like the great fidalgo he was. The Dominican and Greek scholar Antonio de Sousa (1595) ruled only two years, being followed by João de Bragança, a model courtier and prelate, who gave his wealth to the poor. João Manual (1610) son of the Count of Castanheira, after a personal visitation of the diocese in 1611, drew up constitutions which were approved at a synod in 1614 and he subsequently became Archbishop of Lisbon and viceroy. João de Portugal (1626), a Dominican of noble birth and saintly life, made a visitation of the diocese and finding most of his people ignorant of Christian doctrine, wrote and distributed a summary of it. It was remarked that he gave nothing to his relations, saying that the income of the diocese should be spent upon it and its children, the poor. Bernardino de Senna (1629), a Franciscan, had held important posts in his order in different parts of Portugal, where he travelled on foot begging alms, and he had refused two mitres. Becoming general, he lived at Madrid with free entry to the palace, although dressed in rags. Pope Urban VIII named him minister general, and at the age of fifty-eight when he had visited and governed 6000 convents and 280,000 subjects, King Philip presented him to the See of Viseu.

Miguel de Castro IV (1633) never took possession, but Dinis de Melo e Castro (1636) in his two years' rule was diligent in his pastoral office, especially in visitations, and was a great benefactor of the Misericórdias of the diocese. For the next thirty-two years the see remained vacant, owing to the war with Spain following on the restoration of Portuguese independence. Through Spanish pressure, the popes refused to confirm the prelates named by King João IV and during eleven years Portugal and his empire had only one bishop, the others, appointed under the Philips, having died. This energetic man, who lived until one hundred and nine, is said to have ordained 20,000 priests and confirmed a million persons. Finally peace was made with Spain and, in 1671, Manuel de Saldanha became bishop but died three months later and in 1673 João de Mello, a noble and man of greatest austerity, succeeded. He rebuilt the chancel of the cathedral, convened a synod in 1681, added to the constitutions of the diocese, and employed the Oratorians in giving missions. Ricardo Russell, an Englishman, chaplain to Queen Catherine of Braganza, wife of Charles II of England, was translated from the diocese of Portalegre in 1685 and established that congregation in Viseu. He left the reputation of being a man of zeal and illustration, and though a severe disciplinarian, of ready wit.

Jerónimo Soares (1694), a benefactor of the Misericórdia, convoked a synod in 1699 and reformed the diocesan constitutions and those of many brotherhoods and confraternities. After his death the see remained vacant twenty years owing to differences between King João V and Rome. In 1740, Júlio Francisco de Oliveira was appointed. Jose do Menino Jesus (1783), a Carmelite, was a lover of art, as he showed by the statues he presented to the cathedral. He made two visitations of the diocese and was succeeded by Francisco de Azevedo (1792), a prelate of great modesty and charity, who instituted five suburban parishes annexed to the cathedral and subsidized the rectors out of his own funds. He gave a new organ costing 20,000 crusados to the cathedral and laid the foundation-stone of the new hospital of the Misericórdia. This rule was troubled by the Peninsular War and in 1810 British troops occupied his palace and other ecclesiastical buildings.

Francisco Alexandre Lobo (1810), was minister under King Miguel and, when the Liberals triumphed in 1834, had to emigrate to France where he remained ten years. The new Government refused to recognize the vicar-general to whom he had confided the diocese, naming another, which gave rise to a schism. José Xavier de Cerveira e Sousa (1859) abandoned the diocese through his inability to secure obedience from his priests in the matter of clerical dress and was followed by António Alves Martins (1862), a Franciscan who espoused the Liberal cause and fought in the civil war against King Miguel. He dedicated his life to politics and was journalist, deputy, peer, and prime minister. He was a strong opponent of the Papal infallibility at the First Vatican Council and his independence gained him the admiration of the Portuguese Liberals, who erected a statue of him in Viseu.

He was followed by José Dias Correia de Carvalho (1883), translated from the see of Cabo Verde, where he was the first bishop to visit all the churches of the archipelago. António Alves Ferreira dos Santos was his immediate successor.
