= Vasco Fernandes (artist) =

Portuguese Renaissance painter (c. 1475-c. 1542)

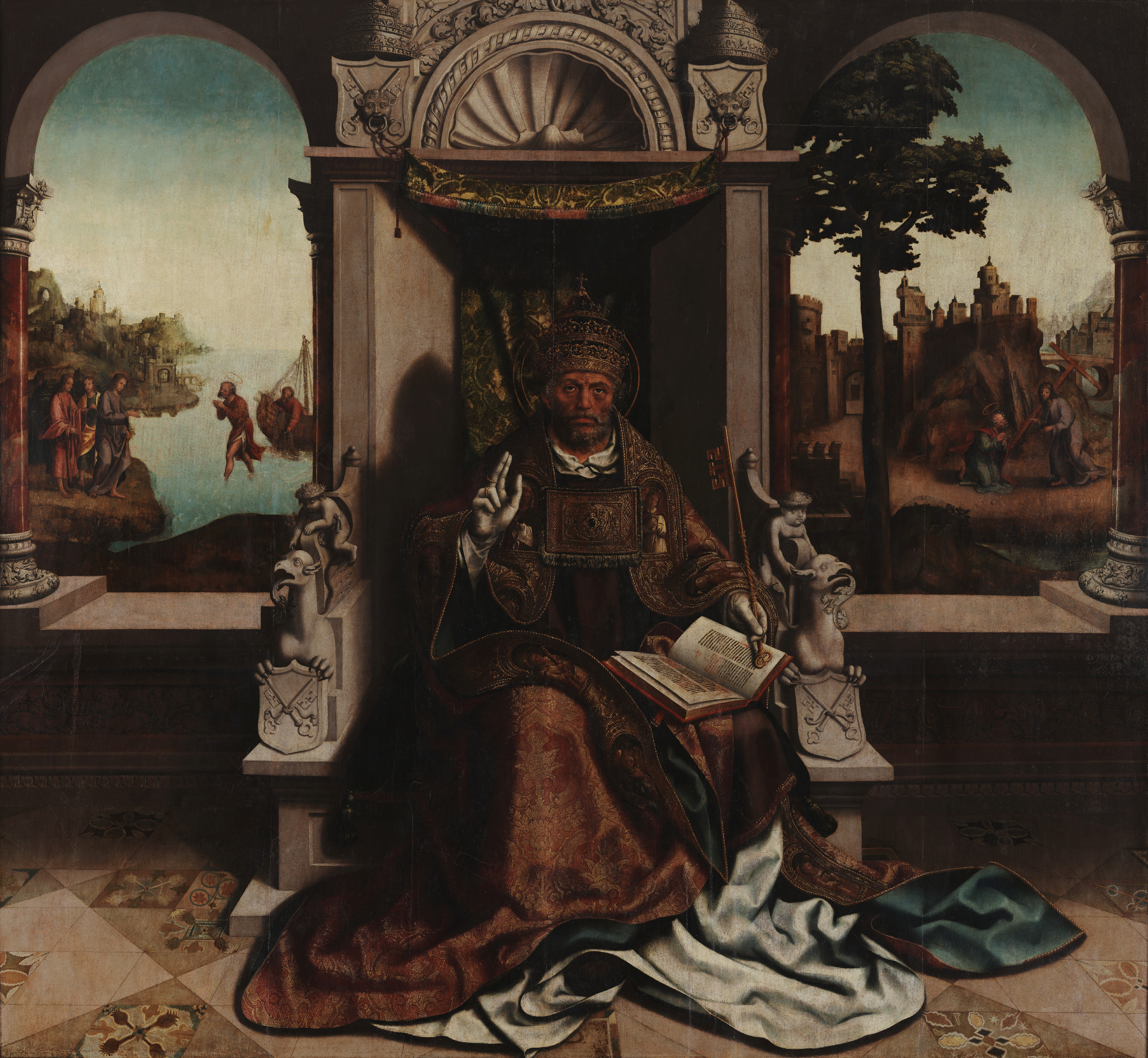
- Saint Peter, c. 1529, by Grão Vasco
- Born: Vasco Fernandes c. 1475; Viseu
- Died: c. 1542

Vasco Fernandes (c. 1475 – c. 1542), better known as Grão Vasco ("The Great Vasco"), was one of the main Portuguese Renaissance painters.

== Life ==
According to local tradition, the painter Vasco Fernandes, known as Grão Vasco from the 17th century onwards, was born somewhere in the area around Viseu, but there is no document recording his place or date of birth, nor the names of his parents. The oldest chronological reference to his name, dating back to the financial year of 1501–1502, refers to him as already married and working as a painter in Viseu, which allows us to infer that he was born around 1475. Between the end of 1542 and the beginning of the next year, as is indirectly confirmed by some documents, he died in this same city, leaving behind a widow and two daughters.

To help us reconstruct his family background, as well as his economic and artistic life, there are roughly fifty written documents, mostly kept at the Viseu District Archives and the Torre do Tombo, in Lisbon. Through these documents, and through the presence of some paintings that have remained in places of worship until the present day, it is known that he worked for the bishops of Viseu and Lamego, namely for the two cathedrals, and for important convents and monasteries in the Douro and Beiras regions, such as Santa Maria de Salzedas, São Francisco de Orgens and Santa Cruz de Coimbra.

== Influences and style ==
As there is no biographical document dating back to that period, the precise place where he learned the art of painting is not known. However, considering that there was no grand master who preceded him in Viseu and that he was on friendly terms with Jorge Afonso, the official painter of Dom Manuel I, it is quite likely that he learned his skills in Lisbon, just like the other painters who studied and plied their trade there.

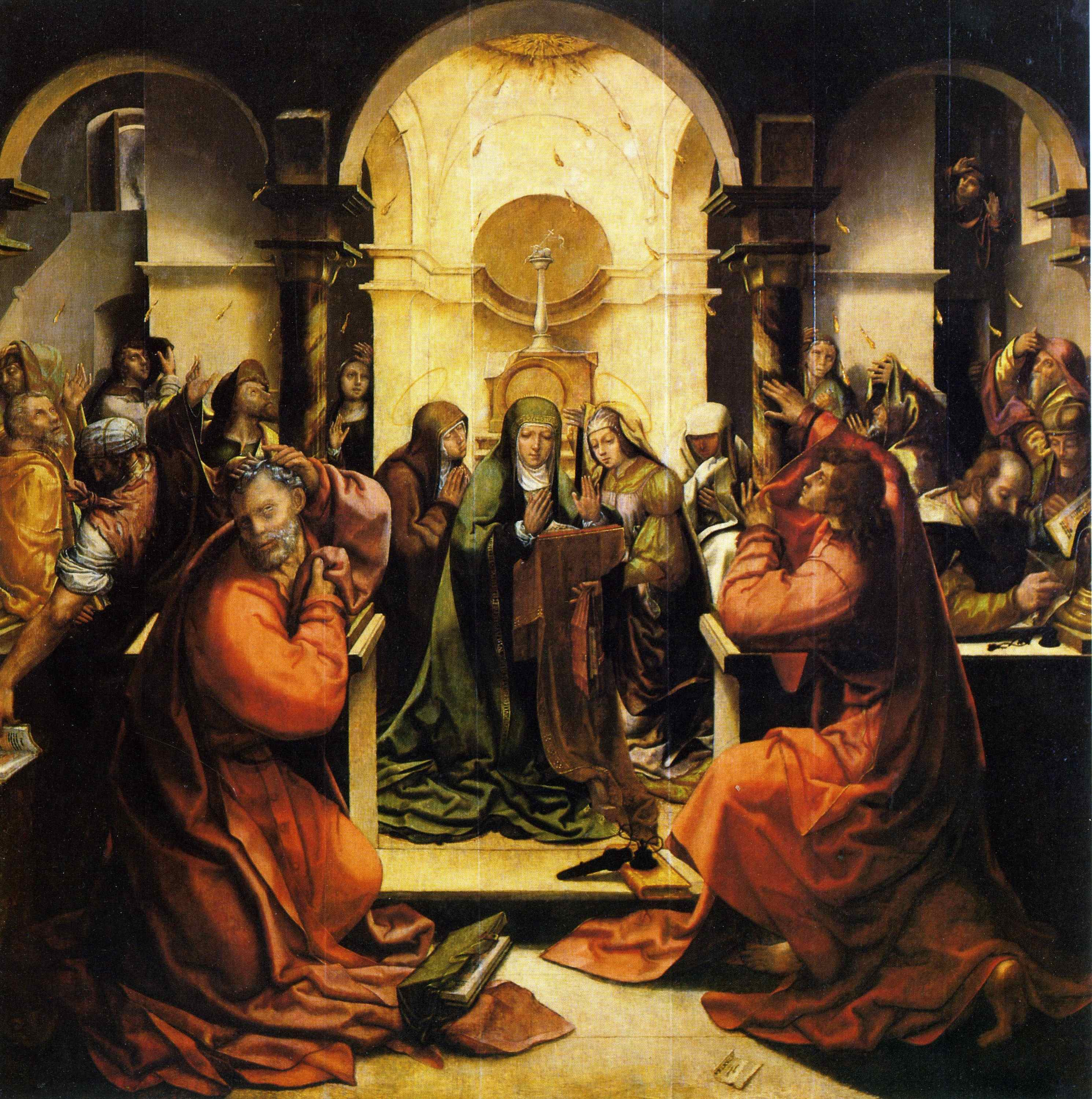
Pentecost, Vasco Fernandes, 1534

The basis for identifying the creative process of the grand master of the Portuguese Renaissance, or the works that are definitely known to have been produced by Grão Vasco, are the two paintings that he signed – the Lamentation with Franciscan Saints, dating from roughly 1520, known as the Cook Triptych because it was sold to an English collector, which is currently to be found at the Museu Nacional de Arte Antiga, and the altarpiece with the theme of Pentecost, painted in 1535, which is kept at the sacristy of the Igreja de Santa Cruz de Coimbra – as well as the five panels remaining from the former altarpiece of the chancel of Lamego Cathedral, exhibited in the museum of that city, and the magnificent Saint Peter of this collection, painted around 1529 for Viseu Cathedral. Starting from this safe base, it is possible to include another thirty-three panels in his creative universe, or in other words it is possible to identify Grão Vasco's participation and individual involvement in a total of forty-one paintings, even though some of them are the result of a work of collaboration, as is the case with the fourteen panels of the cathedral's former altarpiece.

As far as the course of our master's aesthetic development is concerned, it can be said that it evolved from markedly Nordic influences – clearly evident in the altarpiece from Viseu Cathedral, where he worked with painters of Flemish origin – to Italianate influences. A decisive event in his artistic development was the arrival of Dom Miguel da Silva from Rome to take over as bishop of Viseu (1525–1540). This was the patron who, amongst other works, commissioned from him the five great altarpieces for the cathedral, one of which was Saint Peter.

Grão Vasco had a distinct artistic style characterized by a darker color palette than other Portuguese painters of his period. His work featured various shades of tone and used light to create a sense of depth and space. His paintings are noted for their detailed depictions of fabric, faces, and figures, which often showed realistic scenes and ornaments from daily life. Because of these contributions, Grão Vasco is a much prominent figure in the history of Portuguese painting.

== Legacy ==
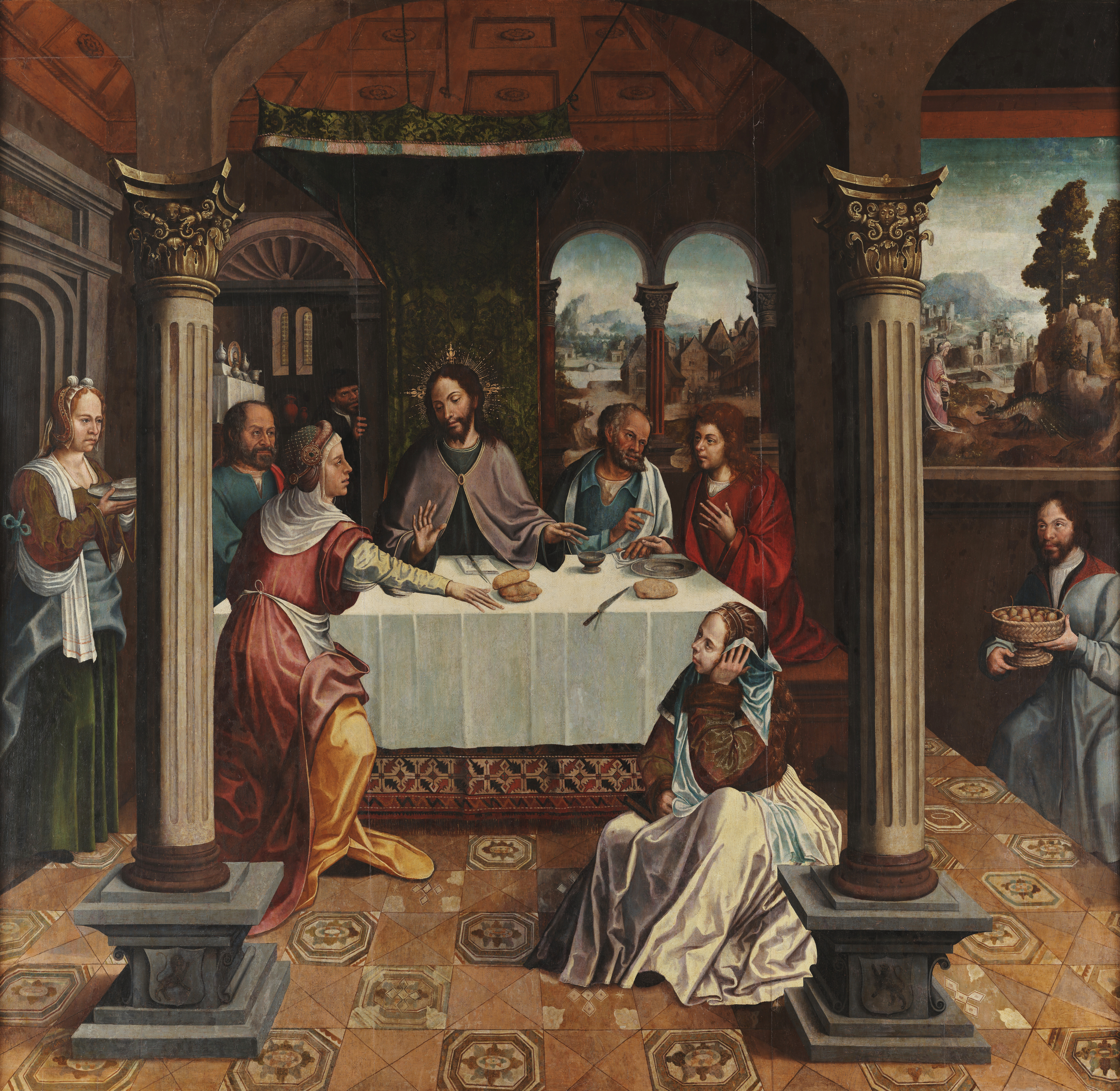
Jesus in the House of Marta (c. 1535), by Grão Vasco, now at the Grão Vasco Museum

The economic importance of the dioceses of Viseu and Lamego, the social, political and cultural prestige of their bishops, members of the prime nobility and advisers to the king, the region's powerful religious centres, the success enjoyed by painting at the time, and, of course, the painter's artistic merit, all these factors enabled his workshop to be transformed into one of the country's most important centres of production. In fact, after 1520, besides Vasco Fernandes, there were various painters active in Viseu, related both professionally and by ties of kinship, who followed his artistic development closely. The most important of these was the Viseu-born Gaspar Vaz, who frequently worked as his collaborator.

Grao Vasco's Última Ceia, and his Saint Peter are both in the Grão Vasco National Museum, Viseu. The former is one of the ten most important artistic works in Portugal according to the Europeana project.

== Artworks ==
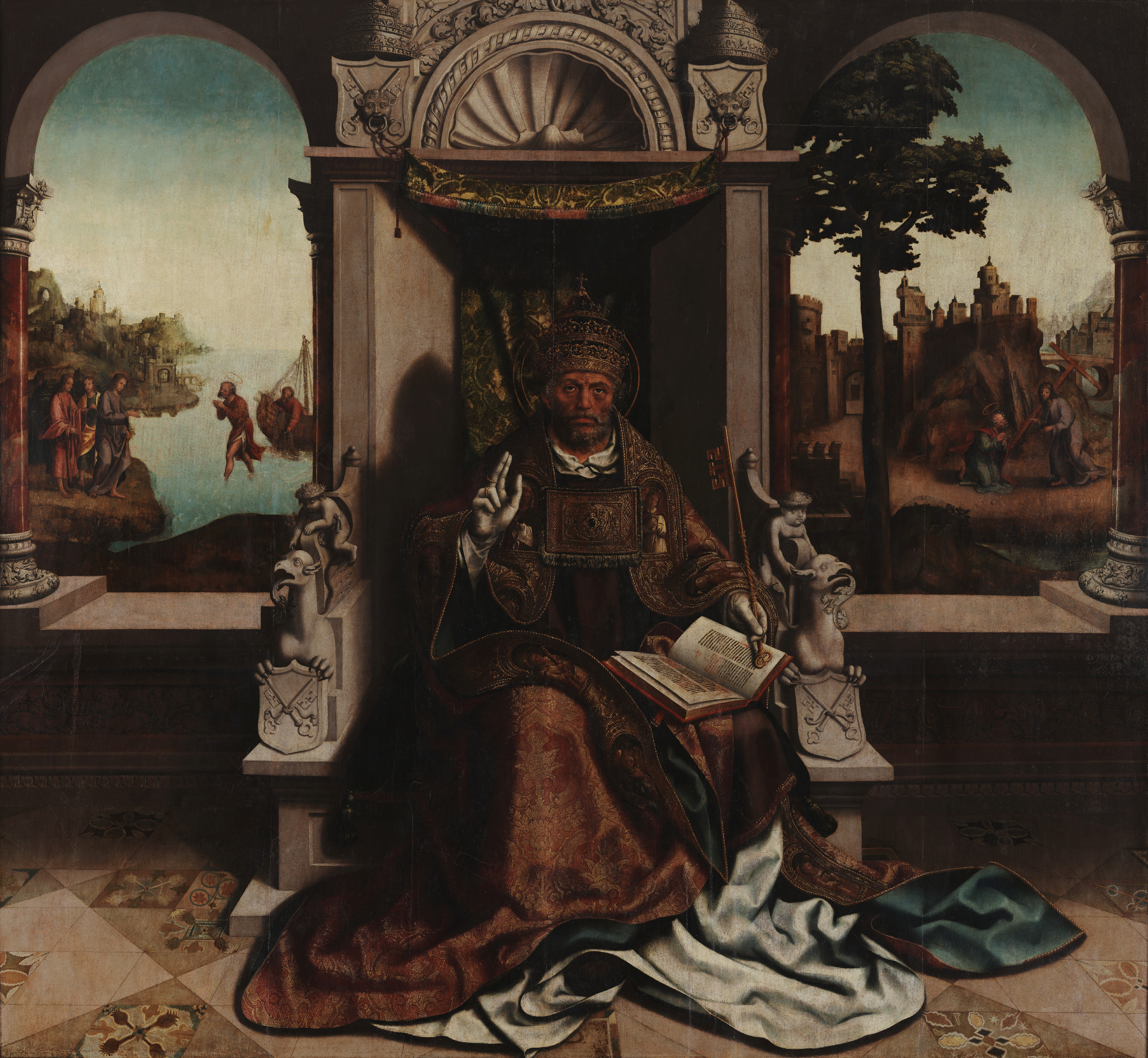

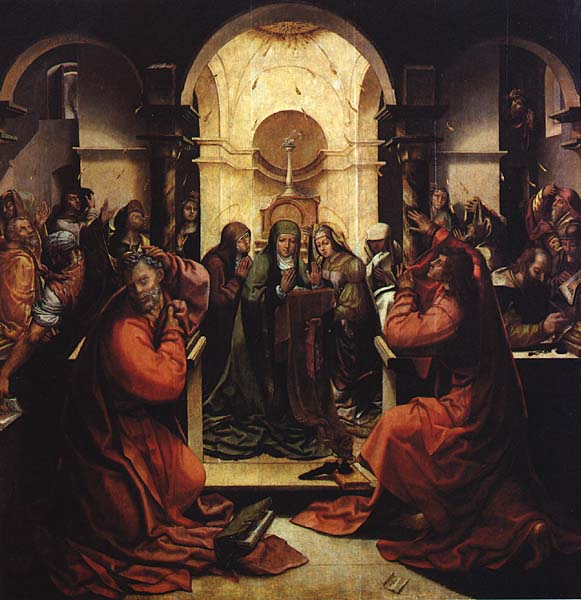

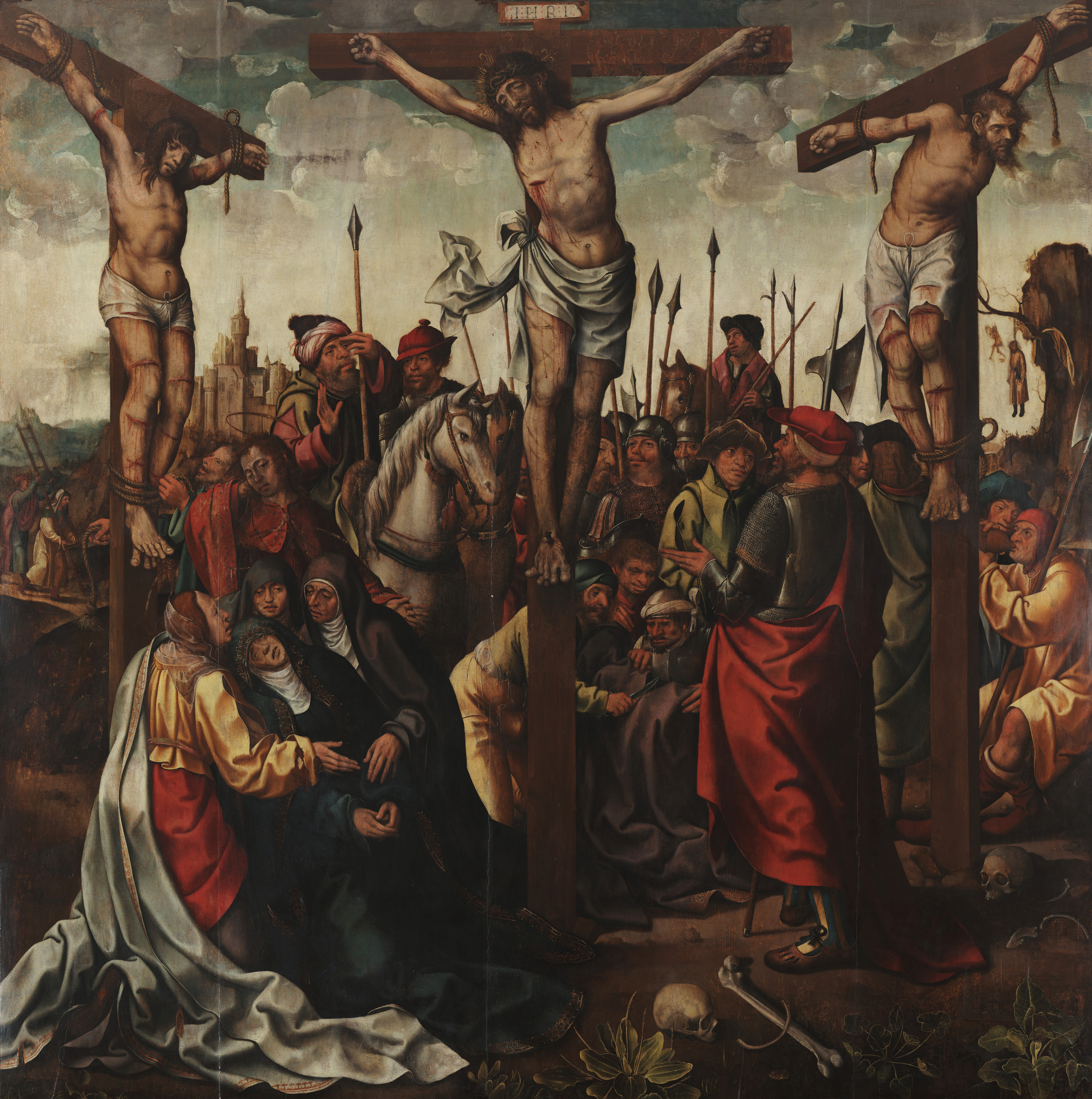

== Namesakes ==
A line of Portuguese wines are labelled with his masterpiece under the name Grão Vasco. An airplane of the TAP Portugal airline is named Grão Vasco.

== Sources ==
- Cristina Nabais; Dalila Rodrigues (1 September 2014). As coleções de escultura em madeira do Museu Grão Vasco e do Museu Nacional de Arte Antiga: um contributo da ciência para a Arte. Imprensa da Universidade de Coimbra / Coimbra University Press. pp. 11–. ISBN 978-989-26-0530-2.
- Grão Vasco; Galeria de Pintura do Rei D. Luís (Lisbon, Portugal); Comissão Nacional para as Comemorac̜ões dos Descobrimentos Portugueses (1992). Grão Vasco e a pintura europeia do Renascimento: Galeria de Pintura do Rei D. Luís, 17 março a 10 junho 1992. Comissão Nacional para as Comemorações dos Descobrimentos Portugueses, em colaboração com Secretaria de Estado da Cultura, Instituto Português do Património Cultural, Instituto Português de Museus.
