= Viseu Cathedral =

Cathedral in Viseu, Portugal

Coordinates: 40°39′35.75″N 7°54′39.47″W

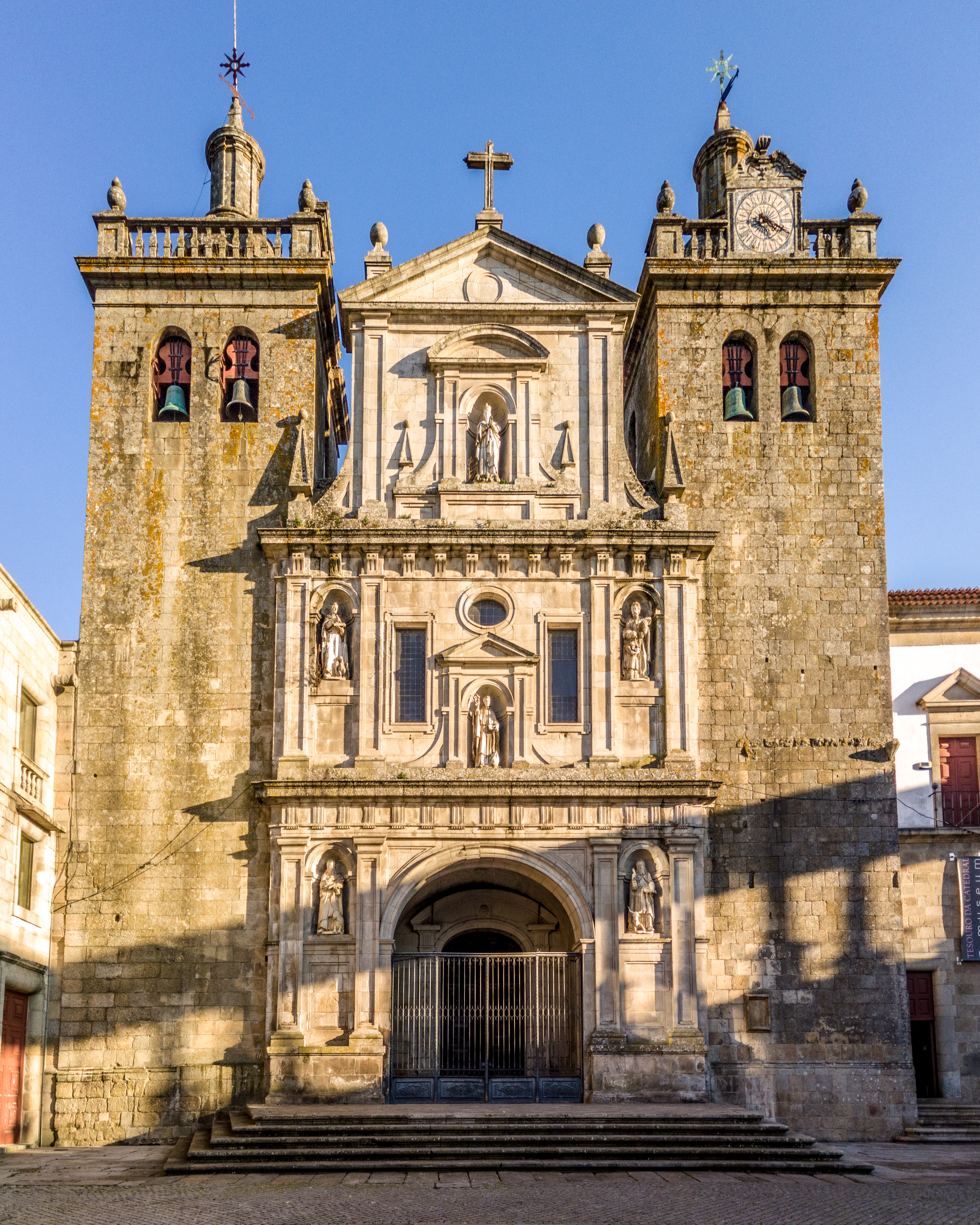
Façade of Viseu Cathedral.

Viseu Cathedral is the Catholic bishopric seat of the city of Viseu, in Portugal. The church started being built in the 12th century and is the most important historical monument of the town. It is currently a mix of architectural styles, specially from the Manueline, Renaissance and Mannerist periods.

The cathedral is located on a large and harmonious square, beside the old Bishop's Palace (now the Grão Vasco Museum) and in front of the Misericórdia Church of Viseu.

== History ==
Archaeological surveys have indicated that the site of Viseu Cathedral was occupied by an Early Christian basilica built during the times of Sueve domination (5th-6th centuries). Christian life in the city was disturbed in the 8th century with the arrival of Moorish invaders, who dominated Viseu until Ferdinand I of León reconquered it in 1058. The bishopric seat was reestablished in the mid-12th century, when the current cathedral building started being erected, but little remains from this early Romanesque building except for some architectural details. The church was greatly enlarged in the following centuries of the Middle Ages, assuming its present configuration as a three-aisled building with three Eastern chapels. Some Gothic chapels in the cloisters also date from this period.

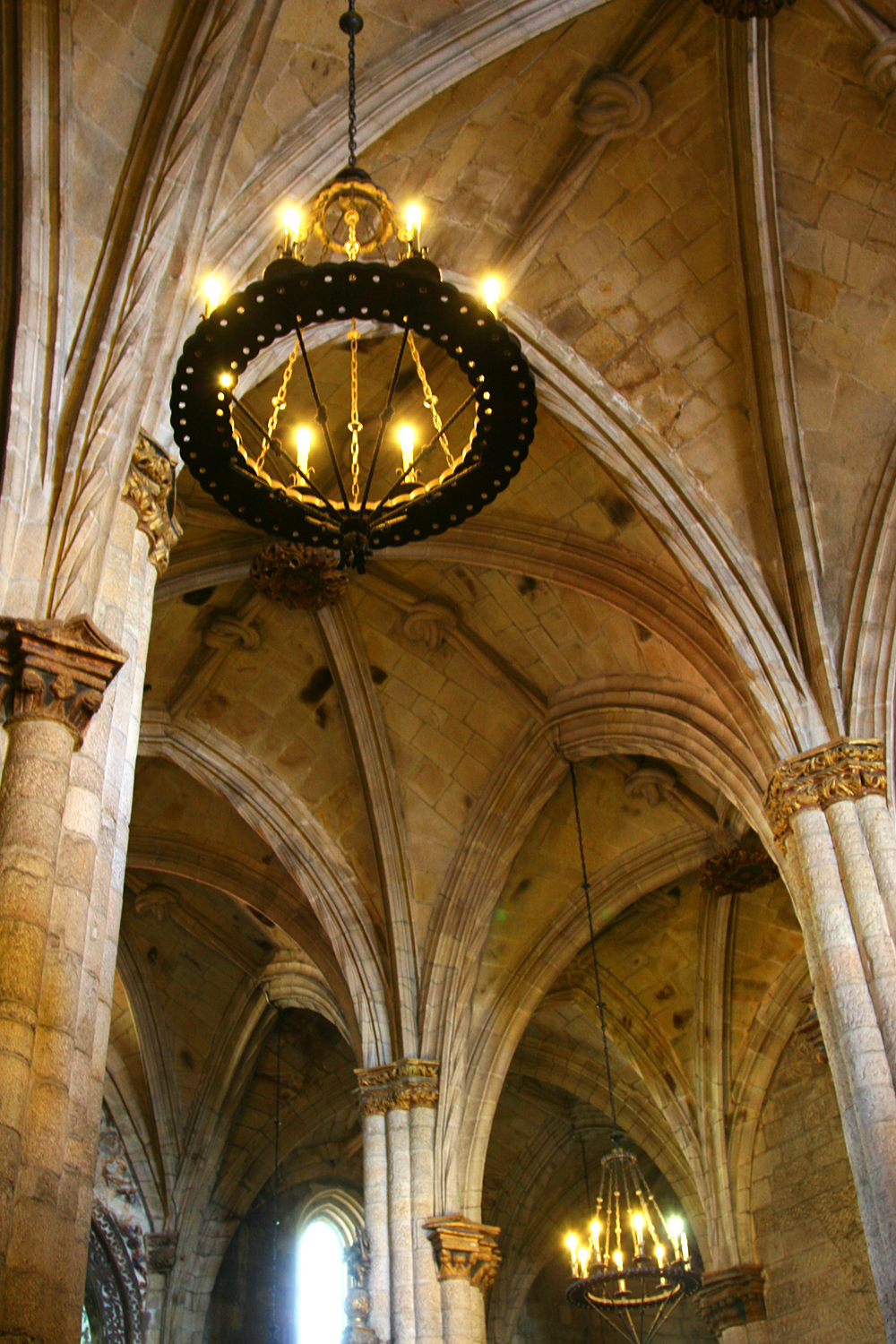
Inner stone vaulting with ribs in the shape of twisted ropes and knots.

From an artistic point of view, the most important building campaigns took place in the 16th century. Bishop Diogo Ortiz de Vilhena encharged architect João de Castilho with the construction of the stone roof of the church and a new façade, which were finished around 1513. Date from this time the rib vaulting of the aisles with decorative ribs in the shape of twisted ropes and knots, a masterpiece of the Manueline style. Around 1539, bishop Miguel da Silva entrusted the building of a new cloister to Italian architect Francisco da Cremona, who designed a fine Renaissance structure.

Also in the first half of the 16th century the cathedral was enriched with several series of painted altarpieces commissioned to leading artists of the time, the most celebrated of which was Vasco Fernandes. These altarpieces were later disassembled but can be seen nowadays in the Grão Vasco Museum, located beside the cathedral.

The old Gothic main chapel was replaced by a new one in the early 17th century. In 1635, a tower and the Manueline style portal were destroyed during a storm, and a new one was entrusted to Salamanca architect João Moreno. The current façade, in the shape of a Mannerist altarpiece, dates from this time. In the Baroque period the cathedral was enriched with an organ, pulpits, altarpieces and tiles (azulejos).

== Art & architecture ==
Viseu Cathedral is a Latin cross church with a three-aisled nave, transept and three Eastern chapels. The main façade is flanked by two towers. The outer, lateral walls of the church have a heavy, menacing appearance, typical of Portuguese mediaeval cathedrals, being partially decorated with merlons.

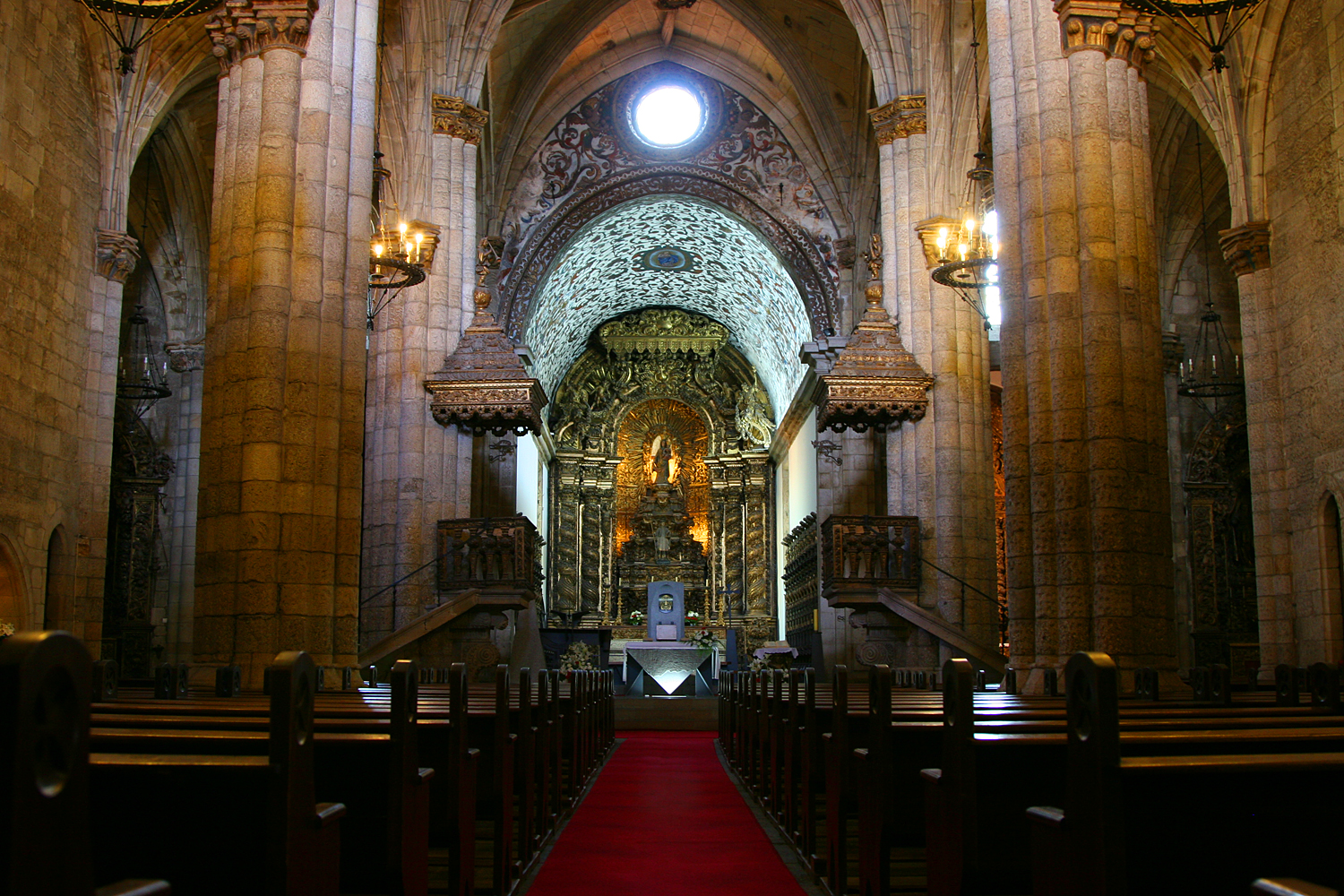
Interior viewed towards the main chapel.

The South (clock) tower is still of mediaeval origin, while the North tower had to be rebuilt in the 17th century after a storm. The storm also destroyed the Manueline façade, which was rebuilt around 1635. The three-storey façade resembles a Mannerist altarpiece and is decorated with niches harbouring statues of the Four Evangelists, as well as the Holy Mary and Saint Theotonius.

In the interior, all aisles are of approximately equal height, resembling a hall church. The stone rib vaulting is supported by massive pillars and was built between 1505 and 1513, being an outstanding example of Manueline architecture. Some ribs of the roof (liernes) are shaped like twisted ropes and knots, typical Manueline decorative motifs.

The main chapel was rebuilt in Mannerist style and features a gilt-woodwork Baroque-Rococo altarpiece designed by famed sculptor Santos Pacheco, who was also responsible for the main altarpiece of Porto Cathedral. The altarpiece incorporates a Holy Mary statue from the 14th century and was carved between 1729 and 1733 by Francisco Machado. The choir stalls were built by Gaspar Ferreira after 1733.

To the South side of the cathedral there is a two-storey cloister originally built in the Middle Ages but greatly modified in the 16th-17th centuries. The ground floor is a typical Italian Renaissance work, built around 1539 by Francisco Cremona. The upper storey is a Mannerist gallery of the 17th century. The cloisters incorporate some Gothic chapels.

== See also ==
- Roman Catholic Diocese of Viseu
