= Arundel Society =

The Arundel Society, often called the Arundel Club, was founded in London in 1849 and named after Thomas Howard, 21st Earl of Arundel, the famous collector of the Arundel marbles and one of the first great English patrons and lovers of the arts. The society was originally the idea of the lawyer Bellenden Ker and was founded at a meeting in the house of the famous painter Charles Eastlake, attended by Eastlake, Ker, Giovanni Aubrey Bezzi, and Edmund Oldfield. The society's purpose was to promote knowledge of the art works of the old Italian, Flemish, and other European masters. Much of the work of the society consisted of publishing chromolithographs of Italian art works, especially fresco paintings, of earlier centuries and raising public awareness for the preservation of these works. One of the people most responsible for furthering the goals of the society was Henry Layard, who joined in 1852. Some of the other important early members were John Ruskin, Charles Thomas Newton, and Henry Liddell. Members of the Society's Council in 1877 included Frederick William Burton, Lord Elcho (Francis Charteris), Edward Poynter, George Edmund Street, Philip Charles Hardwick, George Richmond, and the architect John Norton. The society was discontinued in 1897.

== Arundel Club ==
The Arundel Club was a society founded in London in 1904 for the purpose of continuing more effectively the work of the Arundel Society, which had encouraged the study of art by reproducing the best works of the old masters. The Arundel Club went further by copying and publishing important works in private collections previously inaccessible.
