= 1899 in Portugal =

- Decades: 1870s; 1880s; 1890s; 1900s; 1910s
- See also: History of Portugal; Timeline of Portuguese history; List of years in Portugal

Events in the year 1899 in Portugal.

== Incumbents ==
- Monarch: Charles I
- President of the Council of Ministers: José Luciano de Castro

== Events ==
- 26 November - Legislative election

== Architecture ==
- Construction of St Andrew's Church in Lisbon.

== Culture ==
- "Serrana" (opera) by Alfredo Keil

== Births ==
- 6 February - Jaime Gonçalves, footballer (deceased)
- 25 February - António Pinho, footballer (deceased)
- 21 April - José Ramos, footballer (deceased)
- 30 April - Fernando António, footballer (deceased)
- 10 May - Artur Paredes, guitar player (died 1980)
- 21 August - António Leite, fencer (died 1958)
- 26 August - Francisco Vieira, footballer (deceased)
- 24 October - João Francisco Maia, footballer (deceased)
- 8 November - Manuel António Vassalo e Silva, Governor-General of Portuguese India (died 1985)
- 19 December - Fernando Santos Costa, army officer (died 1982)
- 30 December - José Pimenta, footballer (deceased)
- Armando Machado, fadista, guitarist, "viola" player (died 1974)
- Jesus Muñoz Crespo, footballer (died 1979)
- Sarmento Rodrigues, naval officer, colonist, professor (died 1979)

== Deaths ==
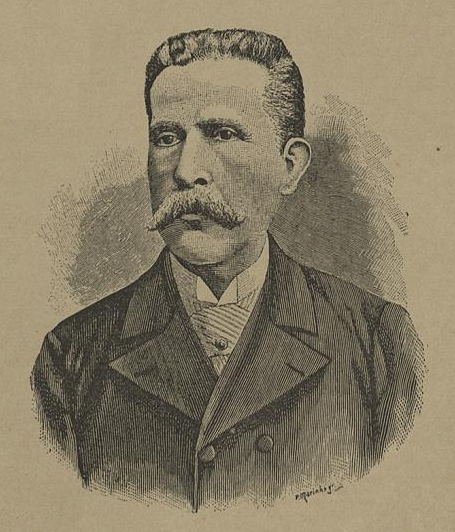
José Simões Dias in O Occidente (1899)

- 3 March - José Simões Dias, poet, short-story writer, literary critic, politician, pedagogue (born 1844).
- José António Duro, poet (born 1875)
