= 1892 in Portugal =

- Decades: 1870s; 1880s; 1890s; 1900s; 1910s
- See also: History of Portugal; Timeline of Portuguese history; List of years in Portugal

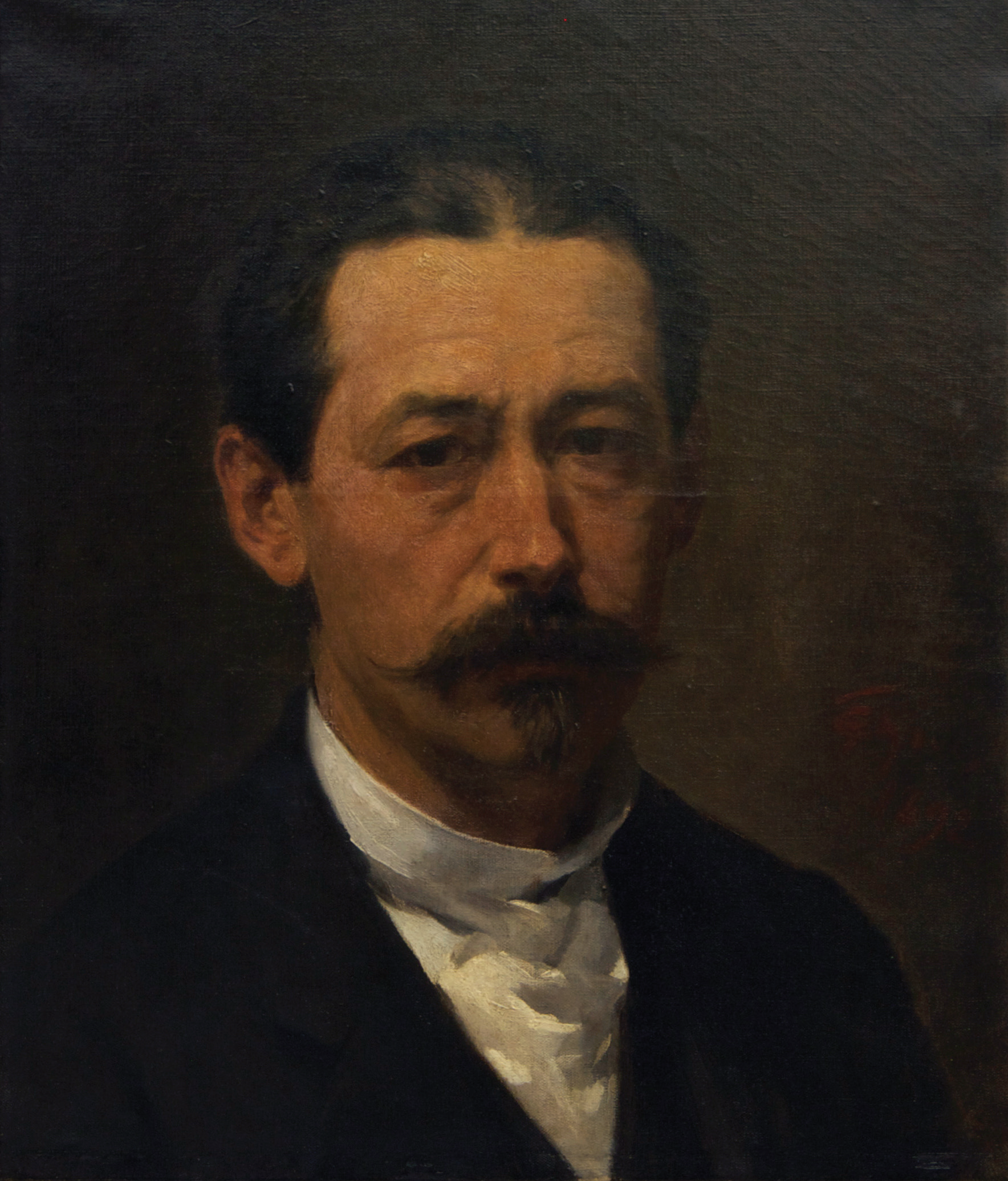
Self-portrait (1892), by José Ferreira Chaves (1838-1899).

Events in the year 1892 in Portugal.

== Incumbents ==
- Monarch: Charles I
- President of the Council of Ministers: João Crisóstomo de Abreu e Sousa (until 17 January), José Dias Ferreira (from 17 January)

== Events ==
- 17 June - Establishment of the Count of Idanha-a-Nova title of nobility
- 23 October - Legislative election

== Culture ==
- Só (poem collection)

== Births ==
- 22 January - João Sassetti, fencer (died 1946)
- 21 May - José Adriano Pequito Rebelo, writer, politician, aviator (died 1983)
- 17 August - António Botto, aesthete, modernist poet (died 1959 in Brazil)
- 4 September - Sarmento de Beires, Army officer, aviation pioneer (died 1974)
- 4 October - Moisés Bensabat Amzalak, scholar, economist (died 1978)
- 5 October - Paulo Bénard Guedes, 127th Governor-General of Portuguese India (died 1960 in Angola)
- 26 December - Lomelino Silva, singer (died 1967)
- José María Sá Lemos, sculptor (died 1971)

== Deaths ==
- José Maria da Ponte e Horta, noble, colonial administrator, soldier (born 1824)

== See also ==
- List of colonial governors in 1892#Portugal
