= 1890 in Portugal =

- Centuries: 17th; 18th; 19th; 20th; 21st
- Decades: 1870s; 1880s; 1890s; 1900s; 1910s
- See also: List of years in Portugal

Events in the year 1890 in Portugal. There were 951,000 registered voters in the country.

== Incumbents ==
- Monarch: Charles I
- President of the Council of Ministers: José Luciano de Castro (until 14 January), António de Serpa Pimentel (from 14 January to 14 October), João Crisóstomo de Abreu e Sousa (from 14 October)

== Events ==
- 11 January - British Ultimatum
- Creation of A Portuguesa, with lyrics by Henrique Lopes de Mendonça and music by Alfredo Keil.
- 30 March - Legislative election
- 14 August - Opening of Coliseu dos Recreios.
- 15 October - "Birth" of Álvaro de Campos, one of Fernando Pessoa's heteronyms.
- Establishment of the Niassa Company.

== Births ==
- 6 March - Francisco José Caeiro, politician (died 1956)
- 19 May - Mário de Sá-Carneiro, poet, writer (died 1916)
- 29 September - Maria Matos, actress (died 1952)
- 12 October - Luís de Freitas Branco, composer, musicologist, professor of music (died 1955)
- 20 October - Luís de Almeida Braga, writer, politician (died 1970)

== Deaths ==
- 2 April - António da Silva Porto, trader, explorer (born 1817)
- 18 April - Caetano da Costa Alegre, poet (born 1864)
- 1 June - Camilo Castelo Branco, writer (born 1825)
- 28 June - Józef Karol Konrad Chełmicki, general (born 1814 in Poland)
- 24 September - João Afonso da Costa de Sousa de Macedo, 1st Duke of Albuquerque (born 1815)
- João de Lemos, journalist, poet, dramatist (born 1819)

== See also ==
- List of colonial governors in 1890#Portugal
