= 1897 in Portugal =

- Centuries: 17th; 18th; 19th; 20th; 21st
- Decades: 1870s; 1880s; 1890s; 1900s; 1910s
- See also: List of years in Portugal

Events in the year 1897 in Portugal.

== Incumbents ==
- Monarch: Charles I
- President of the Council of Ministers: Ernesto Hintze Ribeiro (until 7 February), José Luciano de Castro (from 7 February)

== Events ==
- 2 May - Legislative election

== Births ==
- 2 February - Fernando Jesus, footballer
- 17 June - António Fragoso, composer, pianist (died 1918)
- Tony D'Algy, actor (died 1977)

== Deaths ==
- 14 September - José Alberto de Oliveira Anchieta, explorer, naturalist (born 1832)
