= 1900 in Portugal =

- Decades: 1880s; 1890s; 1900s; 1910s; 1920s
- See also: History of Portugal; Timeline of Portuguese history; List of years in Portugal

The following are the events that occurred in the year 1900 in Portugal.

== Incumbents ==
- Monarch: Charles I
- Prime Minister:
  - José Luciano de Castro (Progressive) (until 26 June)
  - Ernesto Hintze Ribeiro (Regenerator) (from 26 June)

== Events ==
- 28 May – A solar eclipse occurs with the path of totality crossing north-central Portugal.
- 26 June – Ernesto Hintze Ribeiro replaces José Luciano de Castro as Prime Minister.
- October or November – The first sound recordings made in Portugal are produced in Porto by engineer William Darby, who creates a series of gramophone discs documenting sounds of local music as part of a European recording campaign for the Gramophone Company.
- 25 November – Legislative election: The Regeneration Party of Prime Minister Ernesto Hintze Ribeiro wins an absolute majority in the Chamber of Deputies, taking 104 of the 138 seats available. The Progressive Party wins 28 seats to finish as the second largest party.

=== Undated ===
- The Lousal mine in the modern-day Setúbal District begins its 88-year history as a source of pyrite for agricultural sulphur fertilisers.

== Births ==
- 17 January – Olga Álvares Pereira de Melo, philanthropist (d. 1996).
- 22 April – Tomaz Vieira da Cruz, poet (d. 1960).
- 9 June – José Gomes Ferreira, writer (d. 1985).
- 30 July – Fernando Valle, politician and physician (d. 2004).

== Deaths ==
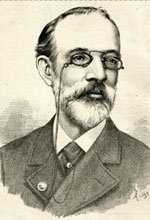
António de Serpa Pimentel

- 2 March – António de Serpa Pimentel, Prime Minister of Portugal (1890) (b. 1825).
- 18 March – António Nobre, poet (b. 1867).
- 30 July – Augusto César Barjona de Freitas, jurist and politician (b. 1834).
- 16 August – José Maria de Eça de Queirós, writer (b. 1845).
- 28 December – Alexandre de Serpa Pinto, explorer and administrator, Governor-General of Cape Verde (b. 1846).
