= 1898 in Portugal =

- Centuries: 17th; 18th; 19th; 20th; 21st
- Decades: 1870s; 1880s; 1890s; 1900s; 1910s
- See also: List of years in Portugal

Events in the year 1898 in Portugal.

== Incumbents ==
- Monarch: Charles I
- President of the Council of Ministers: José Luciano de Castro

== Events ==
- Establishment of SC Vianense.

== Births ==
- 28 January - Vasco Santana, actor (died 1958)
- 18 February - Carlos Guimarães, footballer (deceased)
- 31 July - Alberto Augusto, footballer (died 1973)
- 14 May - Chianca de Garcia, film director (died 1983)
- 19 May - Gentil dos Santos, sprinter (deceased)
- 24 May - José Maria Ferreira de Castro, writer, journalist (died 1974)
- 3 September - Alves dos Reis, criminal (died 1955)
- 23 November - Jorge Gomes Vieira, footballer (died 1986)
- Bernardo Marques, painter, illustrator, graphic artist, caricaturist (died 1962)

== Deaths ==
- 28 January - Roberto Ivens, explorer of Africa, geographer, colonial administrator, Navy officer (born 1850)
- 10 July - José do Canto, landowner, intellectual (born 1820)
- 15 November - Henrique de Barros Gomes, politician (born 1843)
