= 1889 in Portugal =

- Centuries: 17th; 18th; 19th; 20th; 21st
- Decades: 1860s; 1870s; 1880s; 1890s; 1900s
- See also: List of years in Portugal

Events in the year 1889 in Portugal.

== Incumbents ==
- Monarch: Louis I (until October 19), then Charles I (beginning October 19)
- Prime Minister: José Luciano de Castro

== Events ==
- 20 October – Portuguese legislative election, 1889

== Births ==
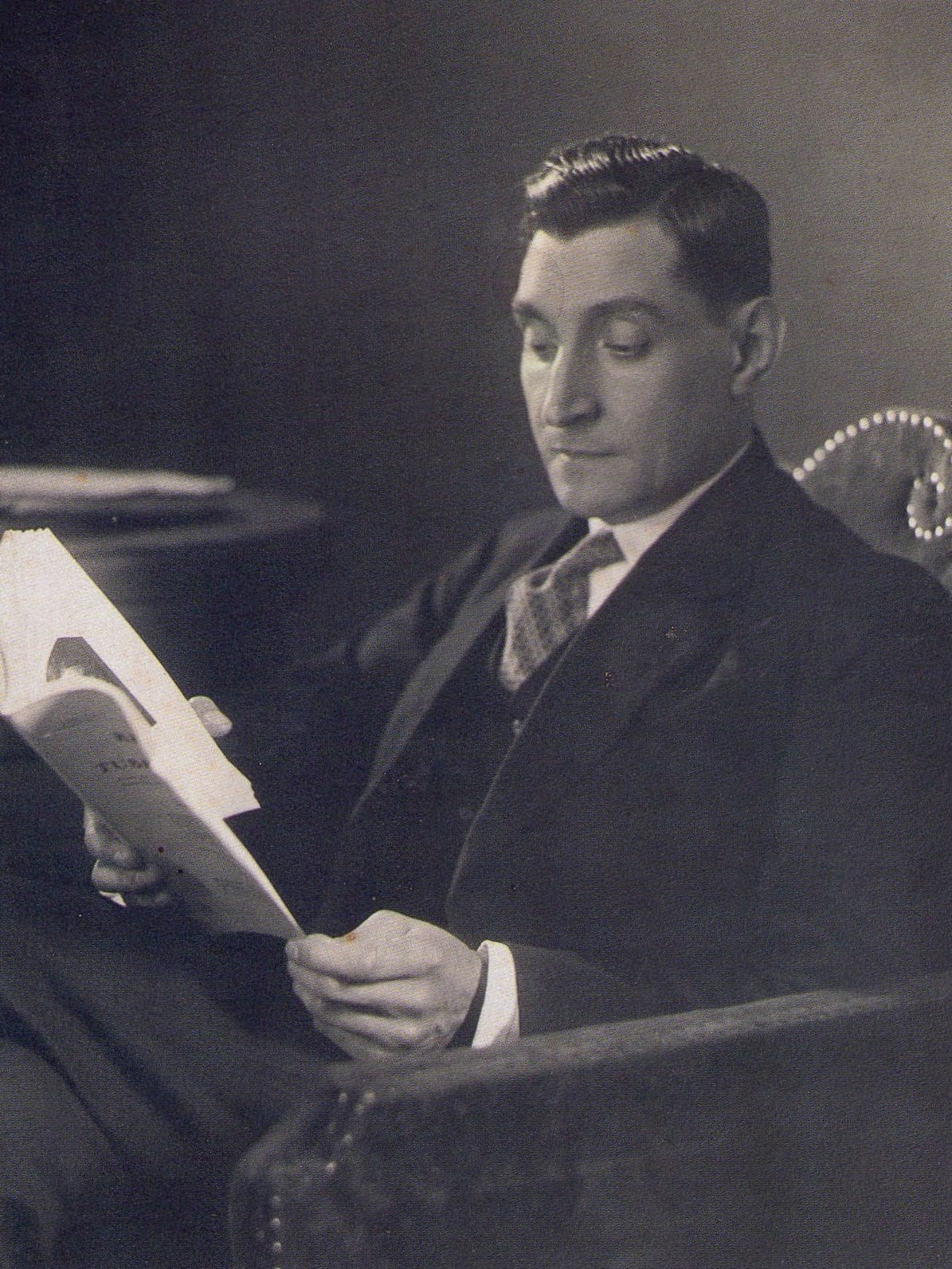
António de Oliveira Salazar

- 28 April – António de Oliveira Salazar, professor and politician (died 1970)
- 30 October – Manuel Guerra, sports shooter.
- 15 November – Manuel II of Portugal, king (died 1932)

== Deaths ==
- 26 September – Infante Augusto, Duke of Coimbra, Royal prince (born 1847)
- 19 October – Luís I of Portugal, king (born 1838)
