= 1811 in Portugal =

- Centuries: 17th; 18th; 19th; 20th; 21st
- Decades: 1790s; 1800s; 1810s; 1820s; 1830s
- See also: List of years in Portugal

Events in the year 1811 in Portugal.

== Incumbents ==
- Monarch: Mary I

== Events ==
- 11 March – Battle of Pombal
- 12 March Battle of Redinha
- 14 March – Battle of Casal Novo
- 25 March – Battle of Campo Maior
- 3 April – Battle of Sabugal
- 14 April–10 May – Blockade of Almeida

== Births ==
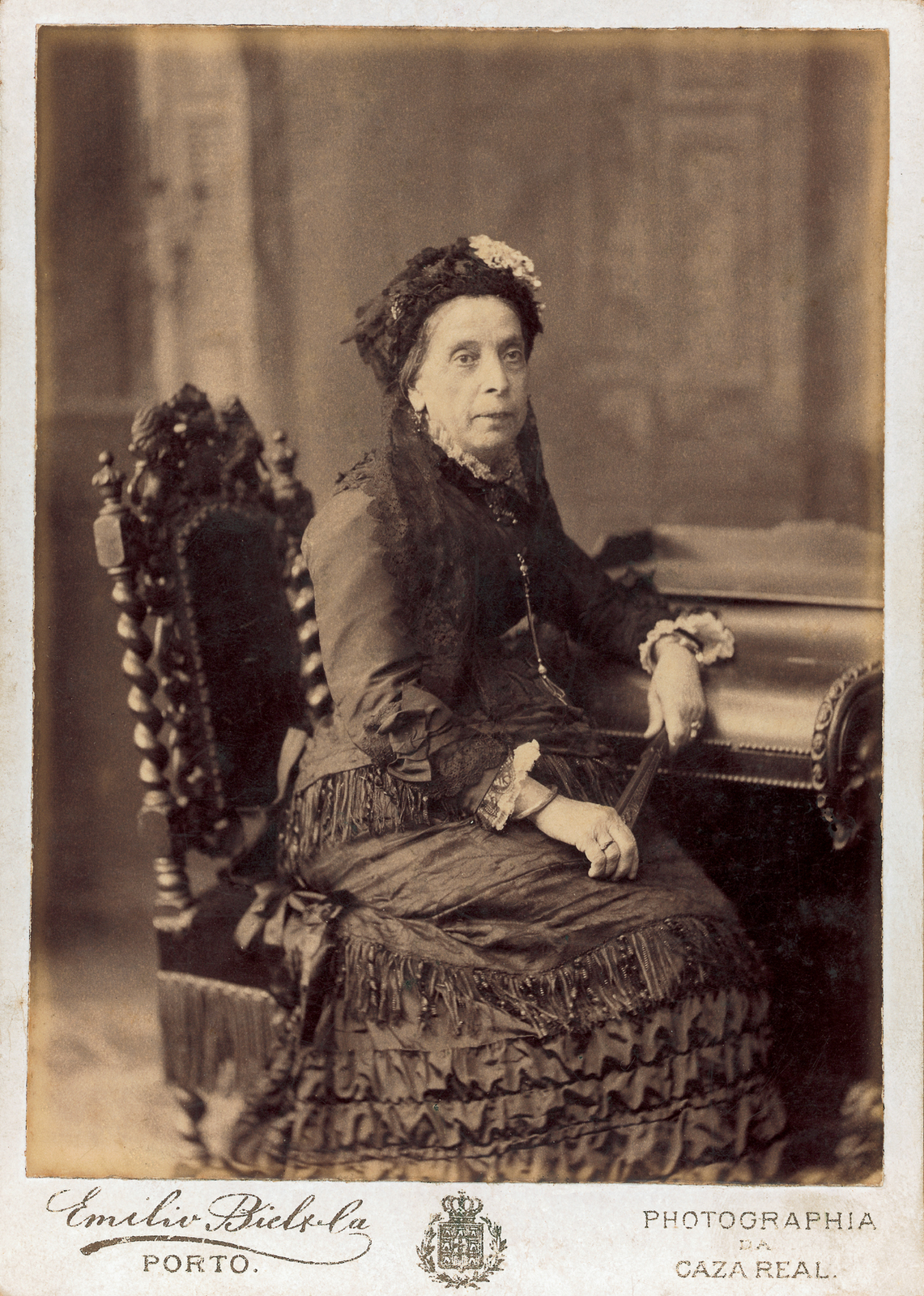
Antonia Ferreira

- 27 January – João Crisóstomo de Abreu e Sousa, prime minister (died 1895)
- 4 June – Antonia Ferreira, businesswoman, known for leadership in the cultivation of port wine and for winemaking innovations (d. 1896).
