= 1896 in Portugal =

- Decades: 1870s; 1880s; 1890s; 1900s; 1910s
- See also: History of Portugal; Timeline of Portuguese history; List of years in Portugal

Events in the year 1896 in Portugal.

== Incumbents ==
- Monarch: Charles I
- President of the Council of Ministers: Ernesto Hintze Ribeiro

== Births ==
- 23 March - José Balbino da Silva, footballer (deceased)
- 12 April - Vítor Cândido Gonçalves, footballer (died 1965)
- 19 July - António Ribeiro dos Reis, footballer, journalist (died 1961)
- 24 September - Cândido de Oliveira, football player, coach, sports journalist (died 1958)
- 19 October - Domingos de Sousa, horse rider (died 1984)
- 22 October - José Leitão de Barros, film director, playwright (died 1967)
- 16 December - Armindo Monteiro, university professor, businessman, diplomat, politician (died 1955)
- Joaquim Filipe dos Santos, footballer (deceased)

== Deaths ==
- 11 January - João de Deus, poet (born 1830)
- 26 March - Antonia Ferreira, businesswoman (born 1811).

== See also ==
- List of colonial governors in 1896#Portugal
