= 1906 in Portugal =

- Centuries: 18th; 19th; 20th; 21st
- Decades: 1880s; 1890s; 1900s; 1910s; 1920s
- See also: List of years in Portugal

Events in the year 1906 in Portugal.

== Incumbents ==
- Monarch: Charles I
- Prime Minister: José Luciano de Castro (until 19 March); Ernesto Hintze Ribeiro (from 19 March to 19 May); João Franco (from 19 May)

== Events ==
- 29 April – Portuguese legislative election, April 1906.
- 19 August – Portuguese legislative election, August 1906.

== Sports ==
- Sporting Clube de Portugal founded

== Births ==
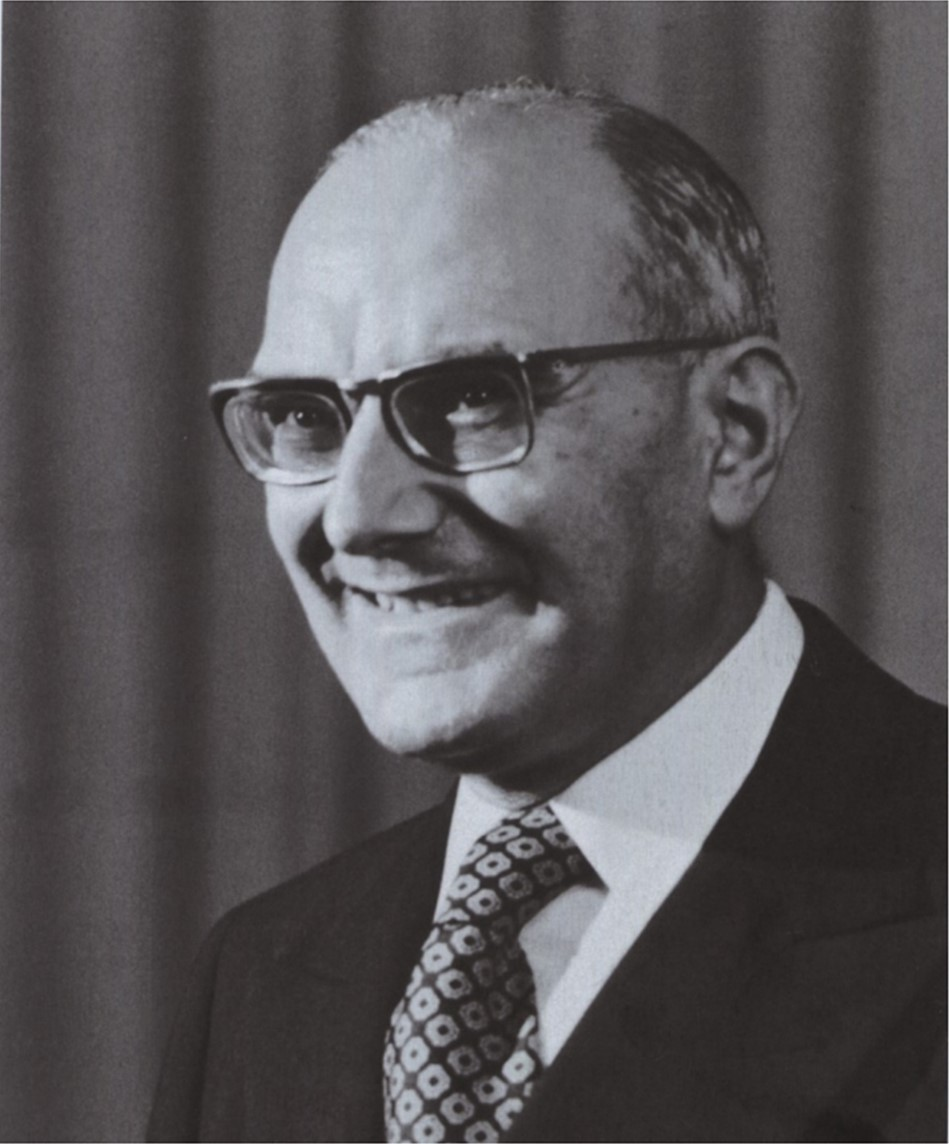
Marcelo Caetano

- 10 May – António Ferreira Gomes, Roman Catholic archbishop (died 1989)
- 17 August – Marcelo Caetano, politician and scholar (died 1980).
