= 1887 Portuguese legislative election =

- 6 March 1887

All seats in the Chamber of Deputies
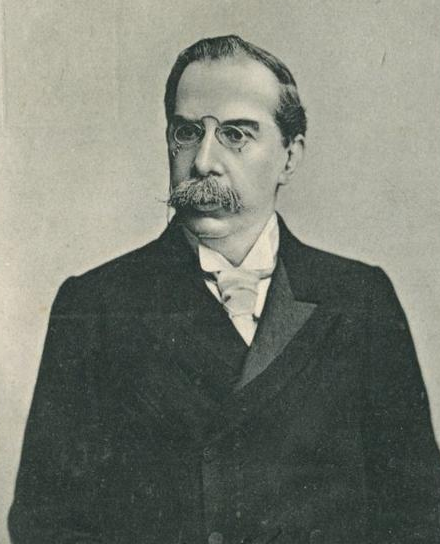

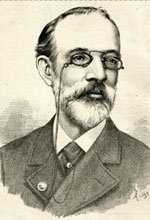
	First party	Second party	Third party
			Rep
Leader	José Luciano de Castro	António de Serpa Pimentel	Political Directory
Party	Progressive	Regenerator	Republican
Seats won	113	36	2
Prime Minister before election
José Luciano de Castro
Progressive
Prime Minister after election
José Luciano de Castro
Progressive

Parliamentary elections were held in Portugal on 6 March 1887. The result was a landslide victory for the Progressive Party, which won 113 seats.

== Results ==
Party	Seats
Progressive Party	113
Regenerator Party	36
Portuguese Republican Party	2
Other parties and independents	1
Total	152
Source: Nohlen & Stöver

The results exclude the six seats won at national level and those from overseas territories.
