= 1893 in Portugal =

- Centuries: 17th; 18th; 19th; 20th; 21st
- Decades: 1870s; 1880s; 1890s; 1900s; 1910s
- See also: List of years in Portugal

Events in the year 1893 in Portugal.

== Incumbents ==
- Monarch: Charles I
- President of the Council of Ministers: José Dias Ferreira (until 22 February), Ernesto Hintze Ribeiro (from 22 February)

== Sports ==
- F.C. Porto founded
- Associação Naval 1º de Maio founded

== Births ==
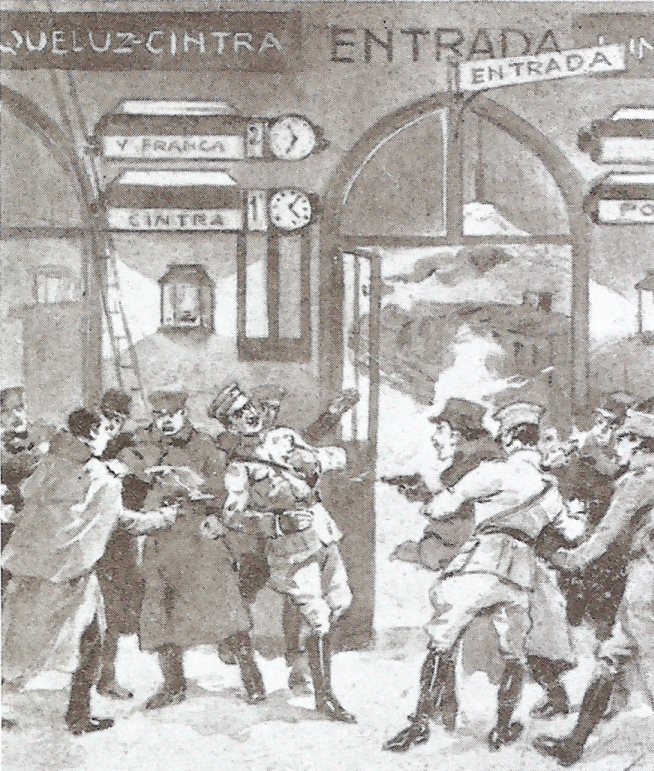
Sidonio Pais murdered by José Júlio da Costa at Lisboa-Rossio Railway Station

- 9 May – Regina Quintanilha, first Portuguese female lawyer (died 1967)
- 14 October – José Júlio da Costa, left-wing political activist who assassinated President Sidónio Pais of Portugal in 1918 (died 1946).
