= 1905 in Portugal =

- Centuries: 18th; 19th; 20th; 21st
- Decades: 1880s; 1890s; 1900s; 1910s; 1920s
- See also: List of years in Portugal

Events in the year 1905 in Portugal.

== Incumbents ==
- Monarch: Charles I
- Prime Minister: José Luciano de Castro

== Events ==
- 12 February – Portuguese legislative election, 1905.
- Establishment of the Progressive Dissidence political party.

== Births ==
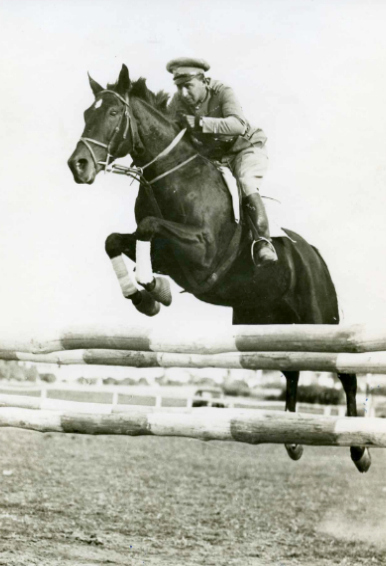
José Beltrão in 1936

- 14 March – José Gralha, Portuguese footballer (deceased)
- 3 May – Adelino da Palma Carlos, lawyer, scholar and politician (died in 1992)
- 27 November – José Beltrão, horse rider (d. 1948).
