= 1892 Portuguese legislative election =

- 23 October 1892

All seats in the Chamber of Deputies
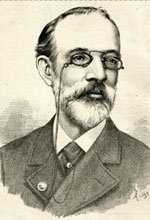

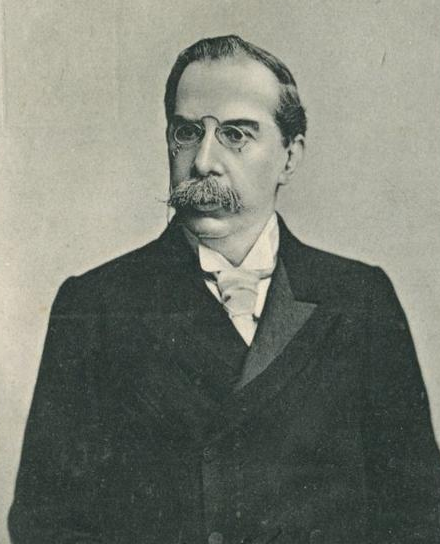
	First party	Second party	Third party
			Rep
Leader	António de Serpa Pimentel	José Luciano de Castro	Political Directory
Party	Regenerator	Progressive	Republican
Seats won	103	45	4
Prime Minister before election
José Dias Ferreira
Independent
Prime Minister after election
José Dias Ferreira
Independent

Parliamentary elections were held in Portugal on 23 October 1892.

== Results ==
Party	Seats
Regenerator Party	103
Other parties and independents	103
Progressive Party	45
Portuguese Republican Party	4
Total	152
Source: Nohlen & Stöver

The results exclude the six seats won at national level and those from overseas territories.
