= 1904 in Portugal =

- Decades: 1880s; 1890s; 1900s; 1910s; 1920s
- See also: History of Portugal; Timeline of Portuguese history; List of years in Portugal

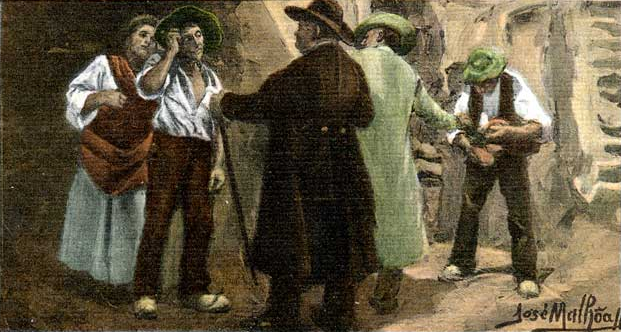
Buying votes, a 1904 postcard illustration by José Malhoa

Events in the year 1904 in Portugal.

== Incumbents ==
- Monarch: Charles I
- President of the Council of Ministers: Ernesto Hintze Ribeiro (until 20 October), José Luciano de Castro (from 20 October)

== Events ==
- 26 June - Legislative election

== Sport ==
- 28 February - Establishment of S.L. Benfica
