= 1907 in Portugal =

- Centuries: 18th; 19th; 20th; 21st
- Decades: 1880s; 1890s; 1900s; 1910s; 1920s
- See also: List of years in Portugal

Events in the year 1907 in Portugal.

== Incumbents ==
- Monarch: Charles I
- Prime Minister: João Franco

== Sports ==
- Leixões Sport Club founded

== Births ==
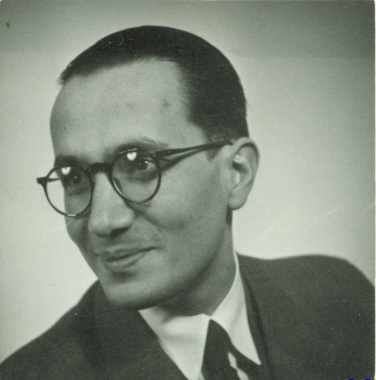
Delfim Santos

- 28 March – Lúcia dos Santos, nun (died 2005).
- 11 August – José Delfim, Portuguese footballer (d. unknown).
- 8 September – Casimiro de Oliveira, racing driver (died 1970)
- 6 November – Delfim Santos, academic, philosopher, educationist, essayist and book and movie reviewer (died 1966).
- 14 December – Beatriz Costa, actress (died 1996)

== Deaths ==
- 1 August – Ernesto Hintze Ribeiro, politician (born 1849)
