= 1895 in Portugal =

- Centuries: 17th; 18th; 19th; 20th; 21st
- Decades: 1870s; 1880s; 1890s; 1900s; 1910s
- See also: List of years in Portugal

Events in the year 1895 in Portugal.

== Incumbents ==
- Monarch: Charles I
- Prime Minister: Ernesto Hintze Ribeiro

== Events ==
- 17 November – Portuguese legislative election, 1895

== Births ==
- 9 July – Aníbal Milhais, the most decorated Portuguese soldier of World War I (died 1970).

== Deaths ==
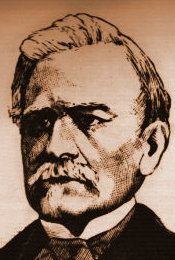
João Crisóstomo de Abreu e Sousa

- 7 January – João Crisóstomo de Abreu e Sousa, prime minister (born 1811)
