= 1894 in Portugal =

- Centuries: 17th; 18th; 19th; 20th; 21st
- Decades: 1870s; 1880s; 1890s; 1900s; 1910s
- See also: List of years in Portugal

Events in the year 1894 in Portugal.

== Incumbents ==
- Monarch: Charles I
- President of the Council of Ministers: Ernesto Hintze Ribeiro

== Events ==
- 15 April – Portuguese legislative election, 1894

== Births ==
Francisco Craveiro Lopes

- 12 April – Francisco Craveiro Lopes, president (died 1964).
- 19 November – Américo Tomás, admiral and politician (died 1987).
- 8 December – Florbela Espanca, poet (died 1930).
