= Maria Amélia Ferreira =

Portuguese professor of medicine

- Born: 27 February 1955 (age 71)
- Other names: Maria Amélia Duarte Ferreira; Maria Amélia Ferreira Tavares
- Occupation: Professor of medicine
- Known for: First woman to be Director of the Faculty of Medicine at the University of Porto
- Awards: Grand Officer of the Portuguese Order of Merit

Maria Amélia Ferreira (born 1955) is a Portuguese university professor and medical doctor. From 2014 to 2018 she was the director of the Faculty of Medicine of the University of Porto, the first woman to hold this position. She was made a Grand Officer of the Portuguese Order of Merit in March 2021.

== Training ==
Maria Amélia Duarte Ferreira was born on 27 February 1955 in Vila Nova de Gaia, which is immediately south of the city of Porto on the left bank of the Douro river. As a student she wanted to study aeronautical engineering, with the intention of working for NASA, but for family reasons chose to study medicine at the Faculty of Medicine of the University of Porto (FMUP). She began her course in 1972 and graduated in 1977. She obtained a doctorate from the same university in 1985 and then started teaching there, becoming a full professor in 1993. In 1997 she obtained a diploma in medical education at Cardiff University in Wales and then took a master's degree in medical education at the University of Lisbon in 2000.

== Academic career ==
Ferreira became director of the Medical Education Centre at FMUP in 2002. At FMUP Ferreira also served as director of the International Relations office, where she was involved in development cooperation programmes abroad, namely in Angola and Mozambique, implementing the Intergovernmental Cooperation Programme in the area of medicine between Portugal and Angola. In 2014, she was appointed director of the Faculty of Medicine, becoming the first woman to hold that position. She retired from the role of director in 2018 but remains a full professor. In her work she has particularly emphasized the development of digital tools to promote learning.

== Other activities ==
In 2012, she took on the role of director of the charity, Santa Casa da Misericórdia, in Marco de Canaveses, a municipality in the Porto district, where she has developed several projects aimed at the elderly, not only in the Santa Casa nursing home but also outside of it. She was responsible for creating a mobile health service and for improving support given to caregivers.

In March 2021, it was announced that she would be a candidate for the municipal council of Marco de Canaveses, as a member of the Social Democratic Party (PSD). She was already acting as an advisor to the council on gender equality.

== Awards and honours ==
- In 2011, she received the Education Award of the Calouste Gulbenkian Foundation for her work in the development and coordination of cooperation projects in the area of medical education.
- In 2015, she received the National Defence Medal for services to the military health service.
- In 2016, she received the Dona Antónia Adelaide Ferreira Award for her work in the fields of medical education and biomedical research and for the work carried out as director of FMUP and at Santa Casa De Marco of Canaveses.
- In 2018, the Santa Casa da Misericórdia de Lisboa (Lisbon Holy House of Mercy) charity awarded her the Nuno Correa Verdades Faria Prize, in recognition of her work with older rural populations, as part of her role as director of Santa Casa de Marco de Canaveses.
- In March 2021, she was awarded the rank of Grand Officer of the Order of Merit, the award being presented by the president of Portugal, Marcelo Rebelo de Sousa. This was specifically given for her role as health consultant to the president.

== Publications ==
Throughout her career Ferreira has carried out scientific research in medical education, anatomy and neuroscience, being the author or co-author of more than 100 peer-reviewed articles (often cited as M.A. Tavares) and over 200 presentations at national and international meetings.
