= António Leite =

António Leite may refer to:

- António Leite (fencer)
- António Leite (gymnast)
