= 1889 Portuguese legislative election =

- 20 October 1889

All seats in the Chamber of Deputies
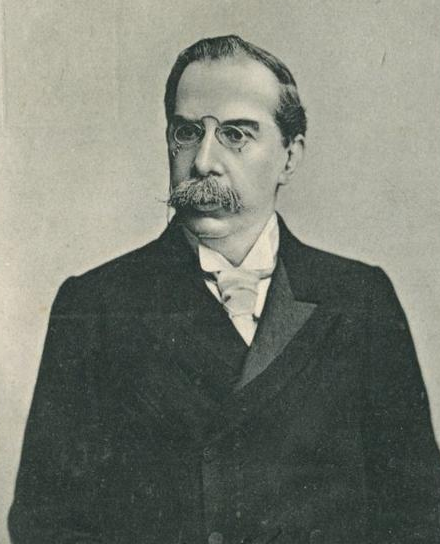

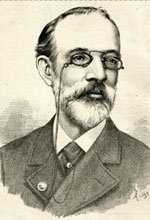
	First party	Second party	Third party
			Rep
Leader	José Luciano de Castro	António de Serpa Pimentel	Political Directory
Party	Progressive	Regenerator	Republican
Seats won	104	38	2
Prime Minister before election
José Luciano de Castro
Progressive
Prime Minister after election
José Luciano de Castro
Progressive

Parliamentary elections were held in Portugal on 20 October 1889. The result was a victory for the Progressive Party, which won 104 seats.

== Results ==
Party	Seats
Progressive Party	104
Regenerator Party	38
Portuguese Republican Party	2
Other parties and independents	8
Total	152
Source: Nohlen & Stöver

The results exclude the six seats won at national level and those from overseas territories.
