= 1897 Portuguese legislative election =

- 2 May 1897

All seats in the Chamber of Deputies
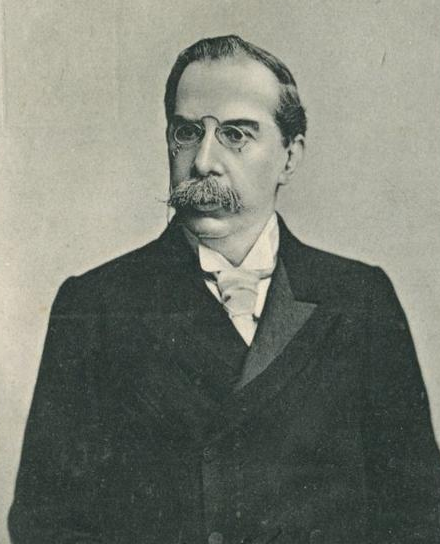

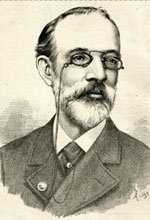
	First party	Second party
Leader	José Luciano de Castro	António de Serpa Pimentel
Party	Progressive	Regenerator
Seats won	88	23
Prime Minister before election
José Luciano de Castro
Progressive
Prime Minister after election
José Luciano de Castro
Progressive

Parliamentary elections were held in Portugal on 2 May 1897. Boycotted by the Portuguese Republican Party, they resulted in a victory for the Progressive Party, which won 88 seats.

== Results ==
Party	Votes	%	Seats
Progressive Party			88
Regenerator Party			23
Other parties and independents			3
Total			114
Registered voters/turnout	525,466	–	
Source: Nohlen & Stöver

The results exclude seats from overseas territories.
