= 1891 in Portugal =

- Centuries: 17th; 18th; 19th; 20th; 21st
- Decades: 1870s; 1880s; 1890s; 1900s; 1910s
- See also: List of years in Portugal

Events in the year 1891 in Portugal.

== Incumbents ==
- Monarch: Charles I
- President of the Council of Ministers: João Crisóstomo de Abreu e Sousa

== Events ==
- January - Rebellion in Porto
- 11 February - Establishment of the Mozambique Company.
- November - Opening of the Belmond Reid's Palace hotel, in Funchal, Madeira.
- Anglo-Portuguese Treaty of 1891
- Opening of the original line of the Funicular dos Guindais, in Porto.

== Births ==
- 21 January - Francisco Lázaro, Olympic marathon runner (died 1912)
- 29 January - António de Menezes, fencer (died 1961)
- 25 February - Alfredo Marceneiro, fado singer (died 1982)
- 11 October - Armandinho, fado guitarist and composer (died 1946)
- 28 December - António Eça de Queiroz, monarchist politician and agitator, government official (died 1968)
- Guilherme Rebelo de Andrade, architect (died 1969)

== Deaths ==
- 24 February - Miguel António de Sousa Horta Almeida e Vasconcelos, 2nd Baron of Santa Comba Dão, nobleman (born 1831)
- 11 September - Antero de Quental, poet, philosopher, writer (born 1842)
- 4 November - Francisco Gomes de Amorim, poet, dramatist (born 1827)

== See also ==
- List of colonial governors in 1891 § Portugal
