= 1902 in Portugal =

- Centuries: 18th; 19th; 20th; 21st
- Decades: 1880s; 1890s; 1900s; 1910s; 1920s
- See also: List of years in Portugal

Events in the year 1902 in Portugal.

== Incumbents ==
- Monarch: Charles I
- President of the Council of Ministers: Ernesto Hintze Ribeiro

== Events ==
- Bailundo Revolt of 1902

== Sport ==
- Establishment of the Club Internacional de Foot-ball
