= 1899 Portuguese legislative election =

- 26 November 1899

All seats in the Chamber of Deputies
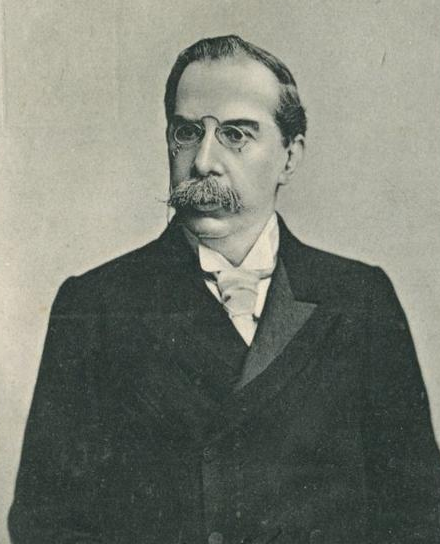

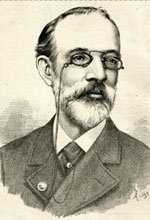
	First party	Second party	Third party
			Rep
Leader	José Luciano de Castro	António de Serpa Pimentel	Political Directory
Party	Progressive	Regenerator	Republican
Seats won	91	39	3
Prime Minister before election
José Luciano de Castro
Progressive
Prime Minister after election
José Luciano de Castro
Progressive

Parliamentary elections were held in Portugal on 26 November 1899. The result was a victory for the Progressive Party, which won 91 seats.

== Results ==
Party	Votes	%	Seats
Progressive Party			91
Regenerator Party			39
Portuguese Republican Party			3
Other parties and independents			5
Total			138
Registered voters/turnout	551,437	–	
Source: Nohlen & Stöver

The results exclude seats from overseas territories.
