= 1901 in Portugal =

- Centuries: 18th; 19th; 20th; 21st
- Decades: 1880s; 1890s; 1900s; 1910s; 1920s
- See also: List of years in Portugal

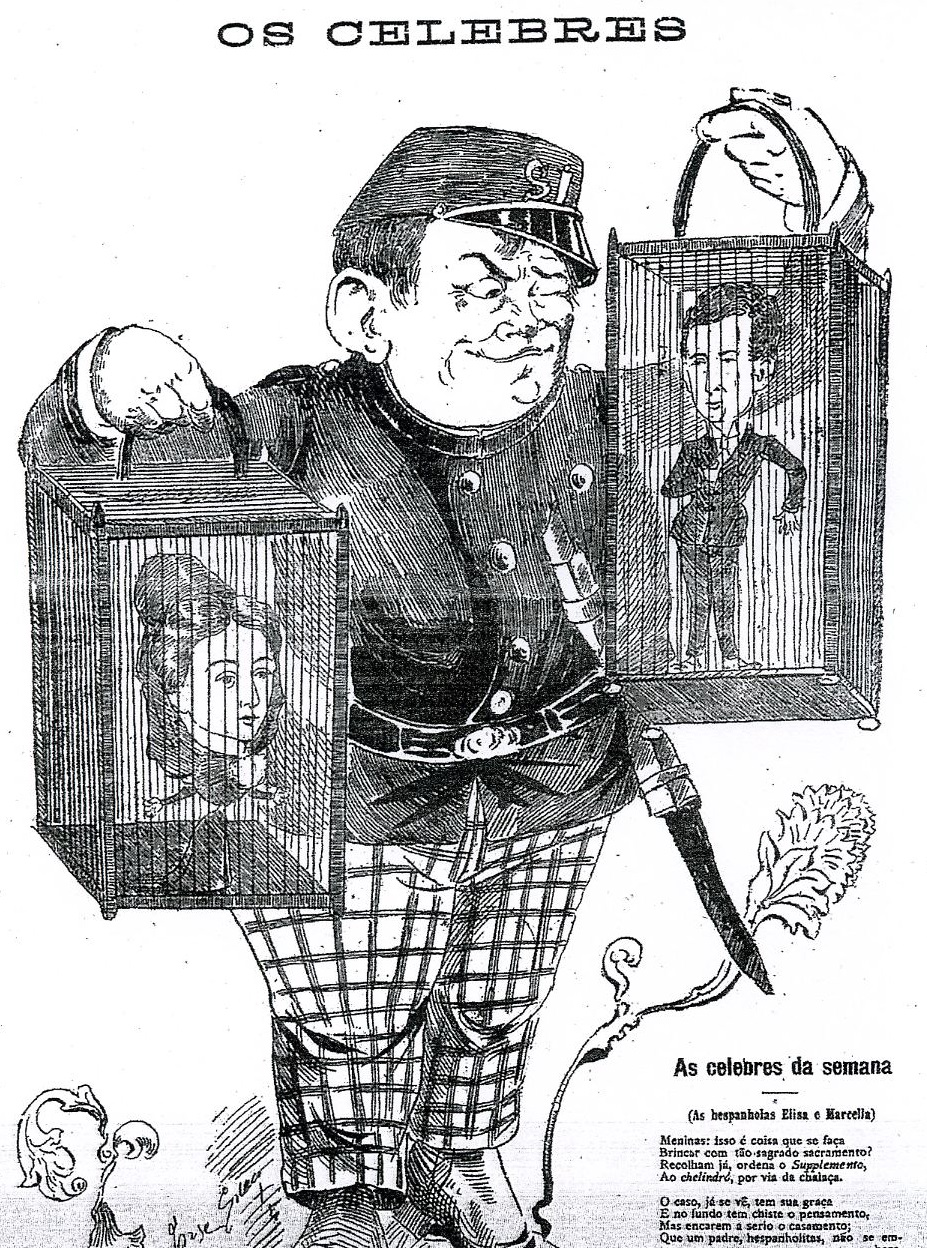

Events in the year 1901 in Portugal. There were 598,000 voters in the country.

== Incumbents ==
- Monarch: Charles I
- President of the Council of Ministers: Ernesto Hintze Ribeiro

== Events ==
- Establishment of the Liberal Regenerator Party
- 6 October - Legislative election

== Births ==
- 15 February – João Branco Núncio, bullfighter (d. 1976)
- 19 December – Vitorino Nemesio, poet and author (d. 1978)
