= 1903 in Portugal =

- Centuries: 18th; 19th; 20th; 21st
- Decades: 1880s; 1890s; 1900s; 1910s; 1920s
- See also: List of years in Portugal

Events in the year 1903 in Portugal.

== Incumbents ==
- Monarch: Charles I
- President of the Council of Ministers: Ernesto Hintze Ribeiro

== Events ==
2 April: King Edward VII visits Lisbon

- 2 April – Edward VII of the United Kingdom arrives in Lisbon on a state visit.
- 1 August – Boavista F.C. is founded as 'The Boavista Footballers' by British expatriates in Porto.

== Births ==
- 12 October – Júlio Botelho Moniz, soldier and politician (d. 1970).
