= 1815 in Portugal =

- Centuries: 17th; 18th; 19th; 20th; 21st
- Decades: 1790s; 1800s; 1810s; 1820s; 1830s
- See also: List of years in Portugal

Events in the year 1815 in Portugal.

== Incumbents ==
- Monarch: Mary I

== Events ==
- 26 December – Count of Barca, title created

== Births ==
- 11 February – João Afonso da Costa de Sousa de Macedo, 1st Duke of Albuquerque (died 1890).
- 1 August – José Carlos O'Neill, titular head of the Clanaboy O'Neill dynasty (d 1887)

== Deaths ==
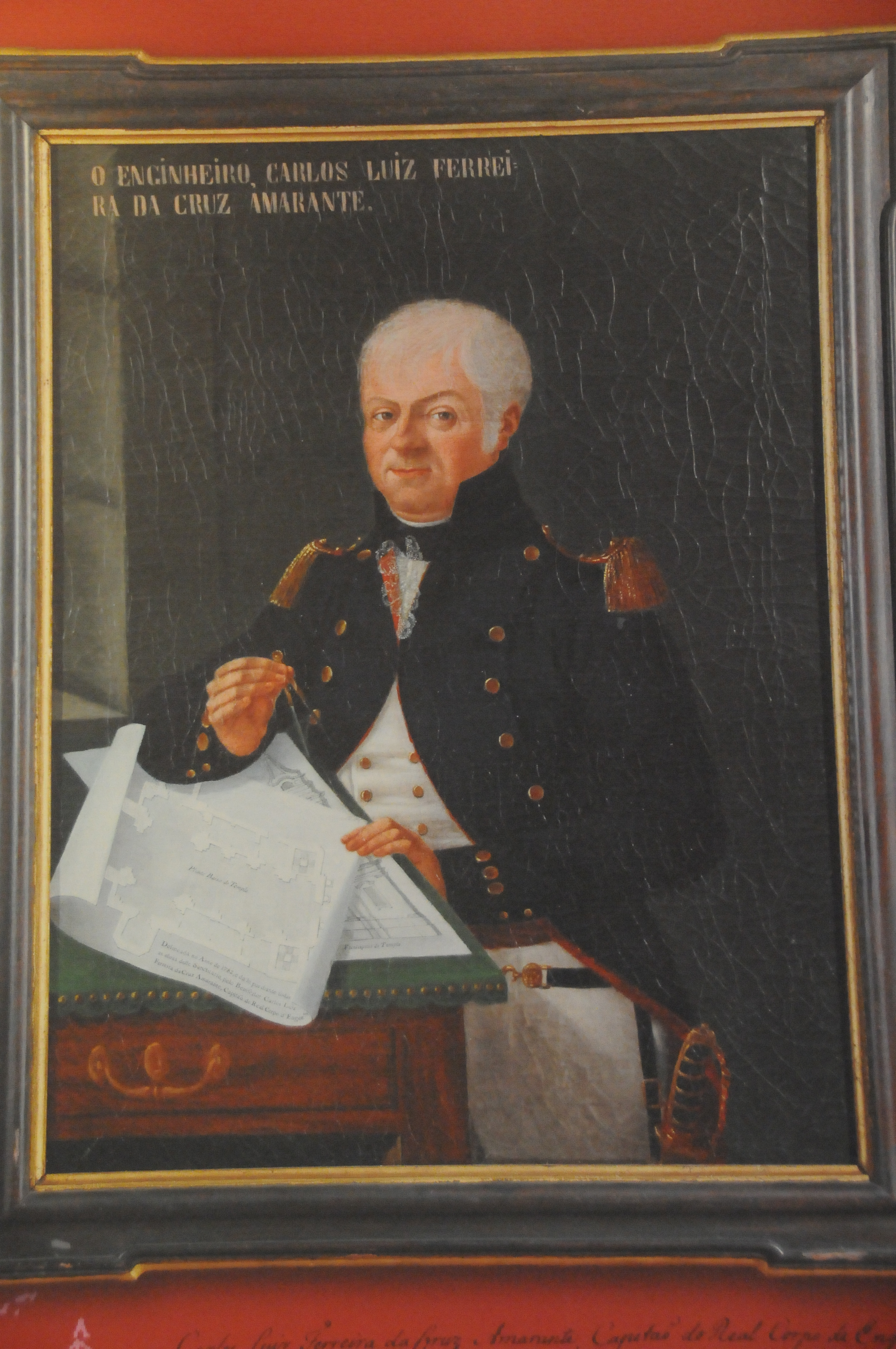
Carlos Amarante

- Carlos Amarante, engineer and architect (b. 1748)
