= List of presidents of the Chamber of Most Worthy Peers (Kingdom of Portugal) =

The president of the Chamber of Most Worthy Peers was the presiding officer of the upper house of the Cortes Gerais, the legislature of the Kingdom of Portugal during most of the constitutional monarchy period. The upper house was named the Chamber of Senators 1838 – 1842.

Portrait	Name (birth-death)	Tenure
The Chamber of Most Worthy Peers – Câmara dos Dignos Pares do Reino (1826 – 1828 / 1834 – 1836)
	Nuno Caetano Álvares Pereira de Melo, 6.º Duque de Cadaval (1799-1837)	30 October 1826 – 14 March 1828
	Pedro de Sousa Holstein, 1.º Duque de Palmela (1781-1850)	14 August 1834 – 4 June 1836
The Chamber of Senators – Câmara dos Senadores (1838 – 1842)
	Manuel Duarte Leitão (1787-1856)	28 January 1839 – 1 May 1839
	Pedro de Sousa Holstein, 1.º Duque de Palmela (1781-1850)	2 May 1839 – 11 January 1840
	Manuel Duarte Leitão (1787-1856)	14 January 1840 – 14 February 1840
	Pedro de Sousa Holstein, 1.º Duque de Palmela (1781-1850)	17 February 1840 – 25 February 1840
	Pedro de Sousa Holstein, 1.º Duque de Palmela (1781-1850)	17 June 1840 – 1 January 1842
The Chamber of Most Worthy Peers – Câmara dos Dignos Pares do Reino (1842 – 1910)
	Pedro de Sousa Holstein, 1.º Duque de Palmela (1781-1850)	10 July 1842 – 12 October 1850
	Guilherme Henriques de Carvalho (1793-1857)	2 January 1851 – 15 November 1857
	Francisco de Almeida Portugal, 2.º Conde do Lavradio (1796-1870)	27 January 1857 – 1 February 1870
	Nuno José Severo de Mendoça Rolim de Moura Barreto, 1.º duque de Loulé (1804-1875)	18 October 1870 – 5 October 1872
	António José de Ávila, 1º duque de Ávila e Bolama (1807-1881)	18 October 1872 – 3 May 1881
	António Maria de Fontes Pereira de Melo (1819-1887)	30 May 1881 – 22 January 1887
	João Crisóstomo de Abreu e Sousa (1811-1895)	3 May 1887 – 20 January 1890
	António Teles Pereira de Vasconcelos Pimentel (1832-1907)	19 April 1890 – 24 September 1892
	Augusto César Barjona de Freitas (1833-1900)	3 October 1892 – 7 December 1893
	Luís Frederico de Bívar Gomes da Costa (1827-1904)	1 October 1894 – 28 March 1895
	Luís Frederico de Bívar Gomes da Costa (1827-1904)	2 January 1896 – 8 February 1897
	José Maria Rodrigues de Carvalho (1830-1908)	30 June 1897 – 1900
	Luís Frederico de Bívar Gomes da Costa (1827-1904)	1900 – 4 June 1901
	Luís Frederico de Bívar Gomes da Costa (1827-1904)	2 January 1902 – 20 April 1904 †
	Alberto António de Morais Carvalho Júnior (1852-1933)	30 September 1904 – 24 December 1904
	António Cândido Ribeiro da Costa (1850-1922)	4 April 1905 – 1 January 1906
	Augusto José da Cunha (1834-1919)	1 February 1906 – 9 February 1906
	Augusto José da Cunha (1834-1919)	1 June 1906 – 5 June 1906
	Augusto José da Cunha (1834-1919)	1 October – 27 February 1908
	António de Azevedo Castelo Branco (1842-1916)	29 April 1908 – 1 January 1909
	Gonçalo Pereira da Silva de Sousa e Menezes, 3.º conde de Bertiandos (1851-1929)	1 March 1909 – 27 June 1910

== Sources ==
- "Presidentes do Parlamento – Monarquia" (PDF). Assembleia da República.
