= Duke of Albuquerque =

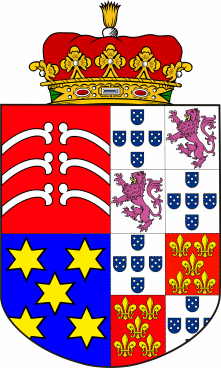
Coat of arms used by the Counts of Mesquitela and Dukes of Albuquerque.

The title Duke of Albuquerque (Portuguese: Duque de Albuquerque) was created under the royal decree of May 19, 1886, of king Luís I of Portugal in favour of Dom João Afonso da Costa de Sousa de Macedo, 2nd Count of Mesquitela and 4th Viscount of Mesquitela.

== List of dukes of Albuquerque ==
1. D. João Afonso da Costa de Sousa de Macedo, 1st Duke of Albuquerque (1815-1890)
2. D. Luís Alberto Oulman da Costa de Sousa de Macedo, 2nd Duke of Albuquerque (born 1952)

== See also ==
- Counts of Mesquitela
- Viscounts of Mesquitela
- Dukedoms in Portugal

== Bibliography ==
- ”Nobreza de Portugal e do Brasil" – Vol. II, page 215. Published by Zairol Lda., Lisbon 1989.
