= Chapel of Nossa Senhora das Vitórias (Furnas) =

- Chapel of Our Lady of Victories
- Capela da Nossa Senhora das Vitórias
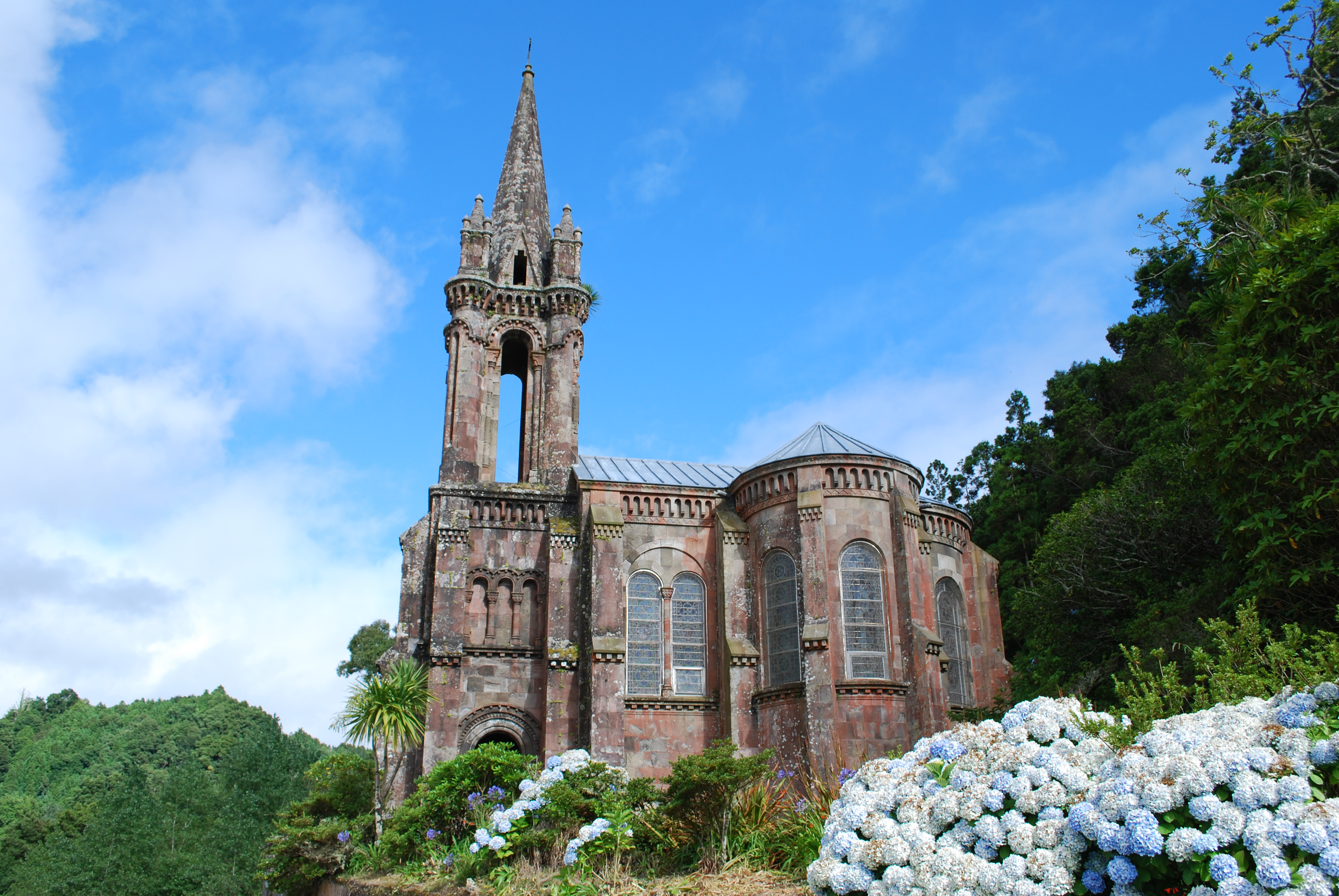
- Lateral view of the Chapel of Nossa Senhora das Vitórias

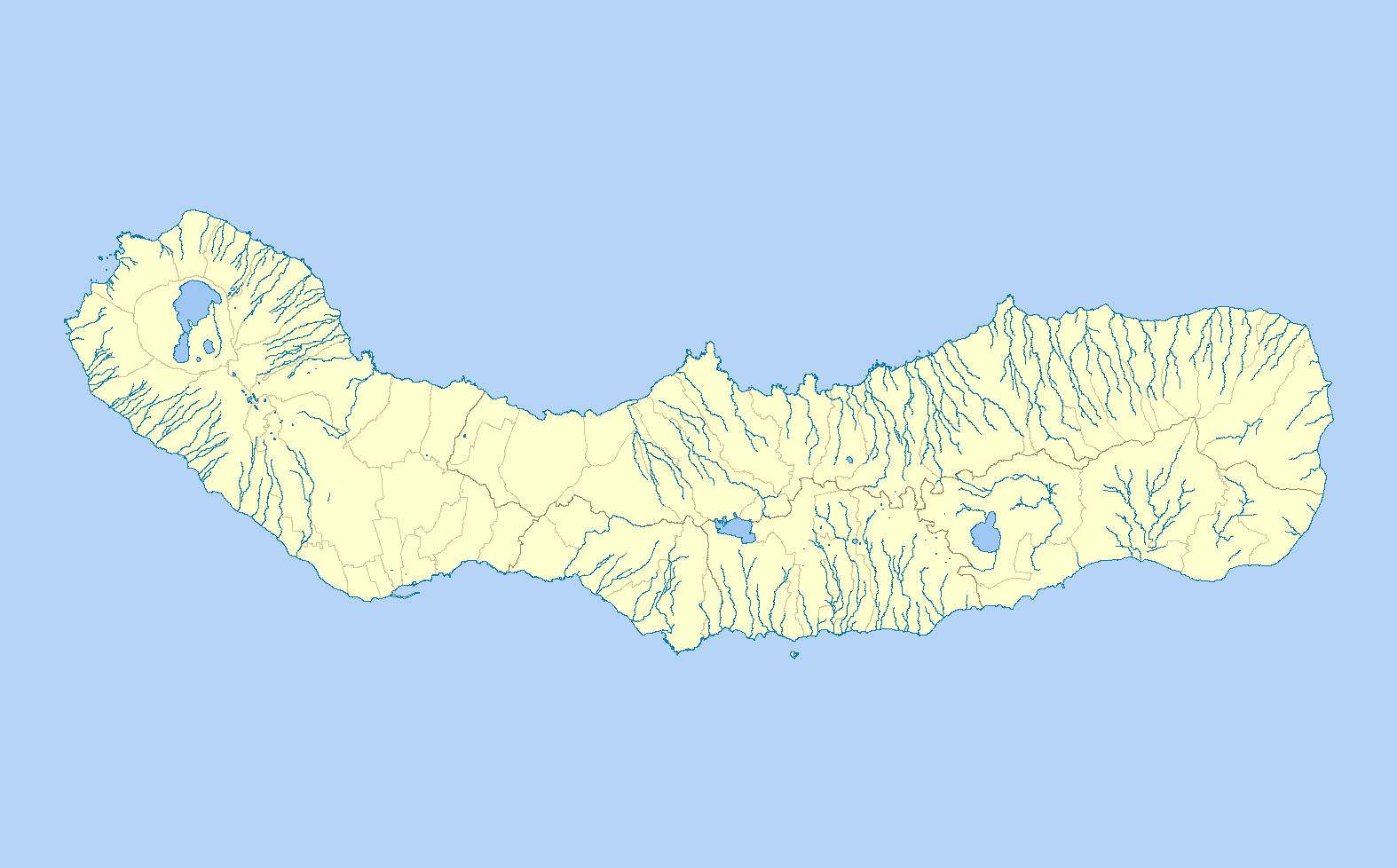
- Location of the church on the island of São Miguel
- 37°45′0.65″N 25°19′50.26″W
- Location: São Miguel, Central, Azores
- Country: Portugal

Architecture
- Style: Neo-Gothic, Neo-Romanesque

Specifications
- Length: 14.19 m (46.6 ft)
- Width: 10.28 m (33.7 ft)

The Chapel of Nossa Senhora das Vitórias (Portuguese: Capela de Nossa Senhora das Vitórias), dedicated to Our Lady of the Victories, a small funerary chapel on the southwestern corner of Lagoa das Furnas in the civil parish of Furnas, on the Azorean island of São Miguel.

== History ==
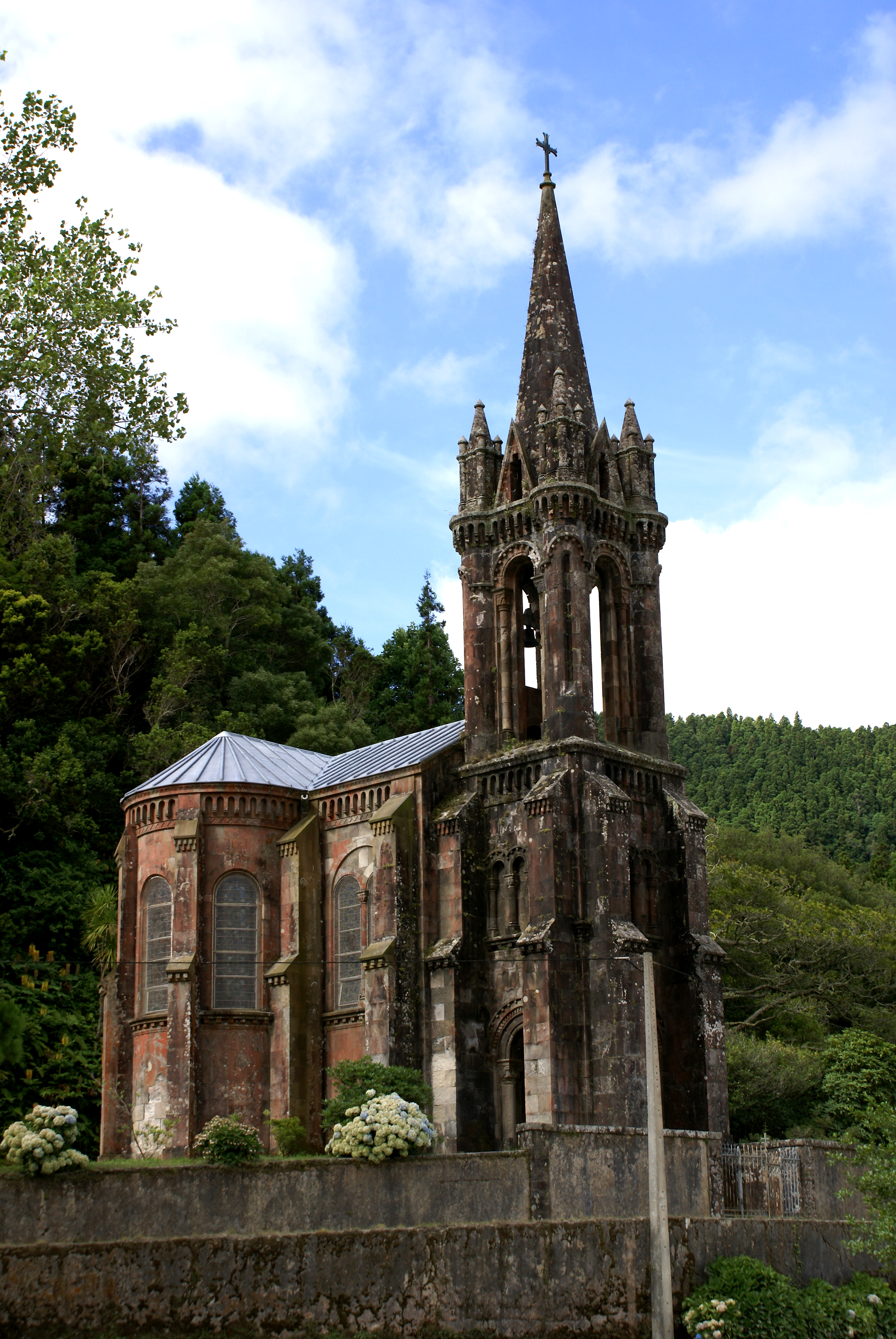
The red brick of the Chapel of Nossa Senhora das Vitórias, built on Furnas Lake as the final resting-place for José do Canto and his wife

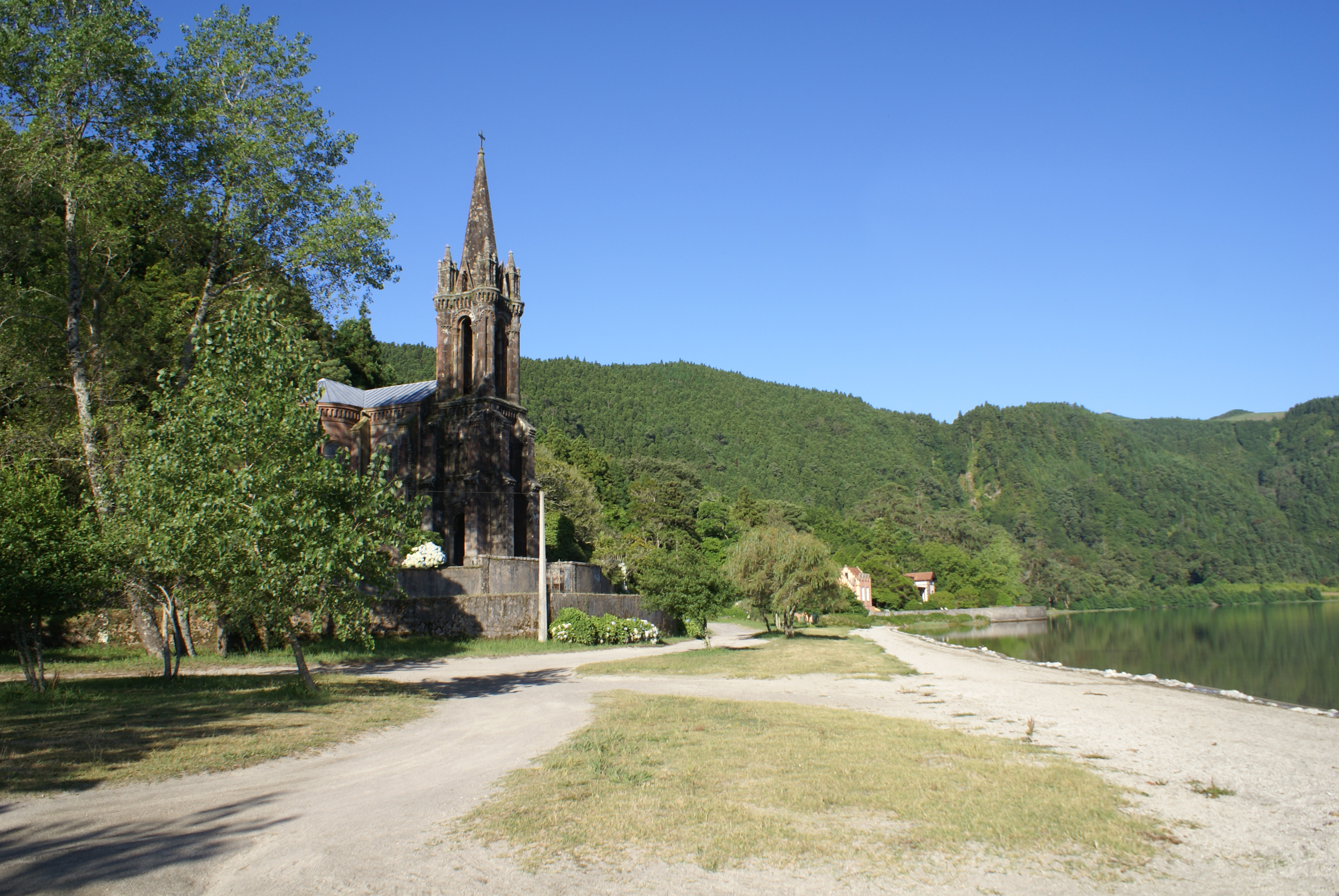
Location of the chapel, on the edge of the Lagoa das Furnas

One of the architecturally rich religious temples in the Azores, it was erected by José do Canto, the gentleman-farmer of São Miguel, following the terminal illness of his beloved wife, Maria Guilhermina Taveira Brum do Canto. In his testament, dated on 27 June 1862, the rich landowner, wrote:

Having, during the great severity of my wife's illness in 1852, vowed to build a small chapel to the invocation of Our Lady of Victories, and not yet having achieved my purpose due to circumstances beyond to my will, I command that you complete the actual building...

The plan was executed by the architect André Breton, who he entrusted with the commission in 1864. Breton's project, was influenced directly by the Seminary Church of Angers, followed José do Canto's aspirations and preferences.

The hermitage was completed during José do Canto's lifetime, near his summer home on Furnas Lake. It was a small artistic miracle: a Neo-Gothic style chapel that imitated the great gothic cathedrals of Europe, in the rustic green-spaces of the North Atlantic archipelago. The hermitage was constructed in detailed basalt and local tuff by Micalense stonemasons, led by master António de Sousa Redemoinho, of Vila Franca do Campo, who started the project around the middle of the 1870s. It was valued, at the time of its construction, for its beautiful stained-glass windows.

By 1882, with the arrival of the pyramid-like spire, the project had come close to completion. It was a cruciform layout, typical of larger Gothic structures in Europe, but a third the size of the original Seminary Church.

It was solemnly inaugurated on 15 August 1886, by the property-owner, and written-up by many of the newspapers of the time for its beautiful stained-glass windows depicting the life of the Virgin, and in the chancel an image in jasper.

When the owner finally died, he was buried alongside his wife within the chapel, thus fulfilling his original intent.

== Architecture ==
The church is situated on a slight elevation of the embankment, oriented towards the length of Furnas Lake, between the water of the lake and a dense forest of the adjacent property.

=== Exterior ===
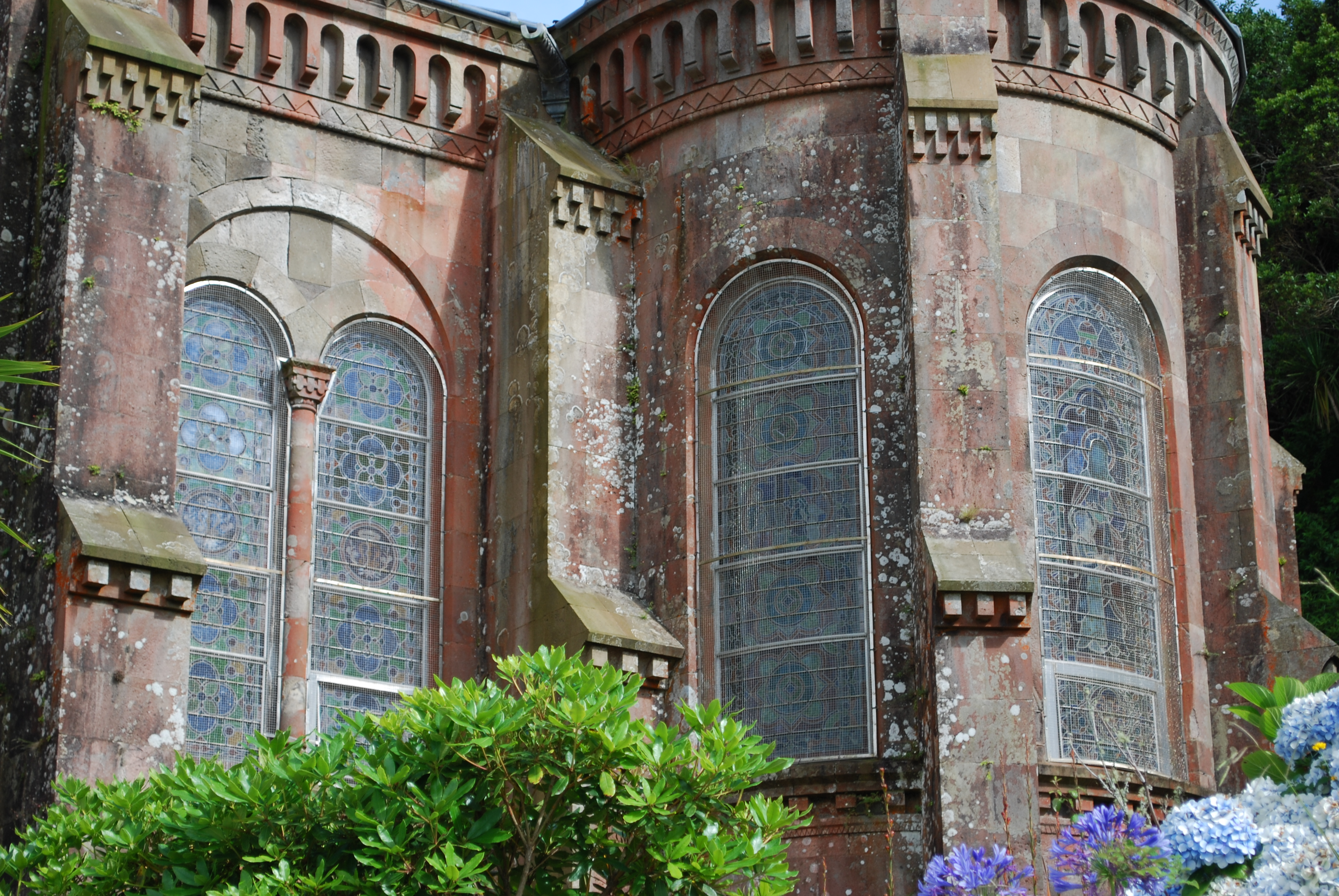
Windows of the chapel

There are 13 three metre-high arcade windows: two twin windows in the nave, three simple windows in the axial chapel and the rest in the transept between the structural members. These windows were executed by Mégnen, Clamens et Borderau in 1883-1884, based on the instructions of José do Canto. They are encased in steel and protected by a metal mesh screen, and applied by the original producers.

The front pavement, in azulejo by Moisseron et L. André, and executed in 1883, are laid in front of the main façade, which is reached by two flights of stairs, with an intermediary pad. The entrance is a triple-arch patio (three directions): the main door, also constructed by Moisseron et L. André, is a bronze-plated wood door with a grating of steel, also installed by Moisseron et L. André.

The tower, of four stories, all with long, narrow Roman arches and sculpted capitals, and surmounted by an elegant spire. On top of the belfry, there are four small turrets with conical pinnacles, triangular niches along the spire and a Christian cross at the apex.

=== Interior ===
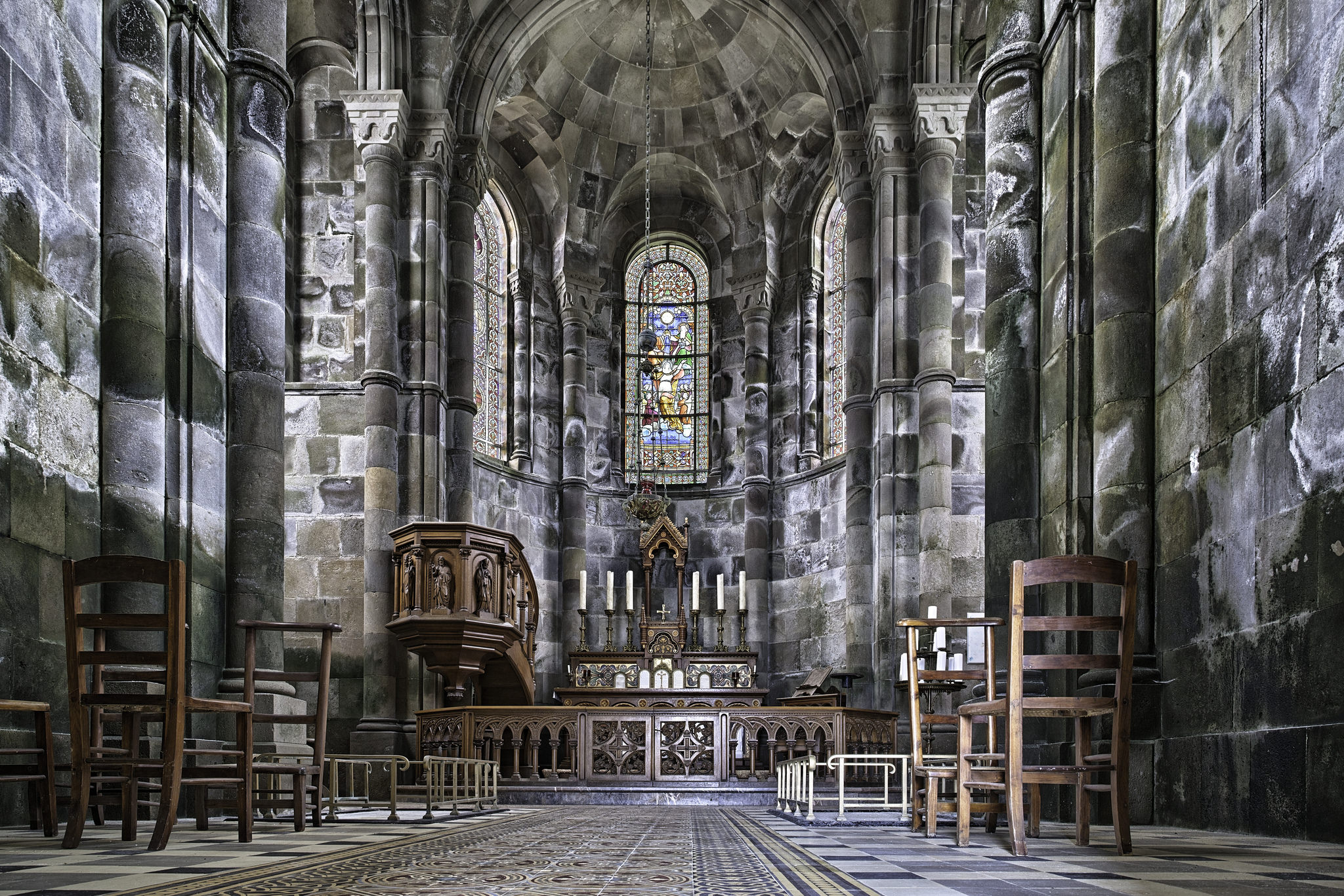
Capela de Nossa Senhora das Vitórias Interior

On the eastern end of its ample transept, is a chapel to Saint Joseph, and an open sacristy along the opposite wall. Within its high ceilings are columns, with sculpted, square capitols, which are duplicated in the square, exterior colonnades that support the structure.

The high Gothic Romanesque exterior is complemented by a French-Parisian interior with appropriate liturgical equipment and decorations. The carved and gilded aedicula, serves as a backdrop to the main altar surrounded by marble, that is faithful to the neo-Romanesque style. It is also present in the grid that separates the sanctuary from the body of the Chapel, the simplified organization of the altar of St. Joseph, or the carved marble fonts for holy water.

Another is the commitment to recovery of the late Gothic octagonal pulpit of wood, the chapel chairs and carved statuary. The figure of "Saint Joseph and Child" in an imitation of the Gothic style (like its predecessors completed by Moisseron et André Lda.), and the Virgin, in the Romanesque style, are a synthesis of the decorative and ornamental adaptions of the Chapel interior. As is the eclecticism of these artefacts, with the suggestions of Byzantine gold and enamelled bronze light fixtures and stools.
