= José Delfim =

Portuguese footballer

Delfim
Personal information
- Full name: José Carlos Delfim Santos
- Date of birth: 11 August 1907
- Place of birth: Portugal
- Position: Forward

Senior career*
Years	Team	Apps	(Gls)
- Olhanense

International career
1925–1926	Portugal	4	(0)
- * Club domestic league appearances and goals

José Carlos Delfim Santos (born 11 August 1907, date of death unknown) was a Portuguese footballer who played as a forward.
