= Count of Idanha-a-Nova =

Portuguese title of nobility

Count of Idanha-a-Nova was a Portuguese title of nobility created on two occasions.

The first creation, on 1 November 1582, by Philip I of Portugal.

Title holders:

1. Pedro de Alcáçova Carneiro (1515 - 1593), 1st Count of Idanha-a-Nova, secretary of kings John III and Sebastian I of Portugal and Vedor da Fazenda of kings Sebastian I and Philip I of Portugal.

The second creation, on 17 June 1892, by Carlos I of Portugal.

Title holders:

1. Jerónimo Trigueiros de Aragão Martel da Costa, 1st Count of Idanha-a-Nova
2. Joaquim Trigueiros Osório de Aragão, 2nd Count of Idanha-a-Nova
3. Joaquim Maria Trigueiros Coelho Frazão Osório de Aragão Martel, 3rd Count of Idanha-a-Nova;
4. Maria de la Salette Trigueiros Coelho Frazão Osório de Aragão Martel, 4th Count of Idanha-a-Nova

== See also ==
- Idanha-a-Nova Municipality
