= Lomelino Silva =

Lomelino Silva (26 December 1892 – 1967) was a Portuguese operatic tenor. He is known as the Portuguese Caruso.

== Biography ==
Silva was born on 26 December 1892 in Rua das Maravilhas in Funchal, in the parish of São Pedro on the Portuguese island of Madeira.

His singing talent was discovered when he was a youth while performing in the Teatro Municipal Baltazar Dias in Funchal. Some time later, on the recommendation of some local Madeiran musicians who were of the opinion that he had excellent vocal quality, he went to Italy with the intention of studying classical music with two of the masters of the bel canto, Giovanni Laura and Ercole Pizzi.

== Career ==
His first professional premier performance as a tenor in Italy in 1921 was the beginning of his international singing career. In 1926, he made recordings in the UK with His Master's Voice.

During one of his early performances in the United States he was nicknamed "the Portuguese Caruso" and he kept that label ever since.

== Recordings ==
His recordings have been published on a CD titled Lomelino Silva, o Caruso português.
