= Fernando Jesus =

Portuguese footballer

Personal information
- Full name: Fernando de Jesus
- Date of birth: 2 February 1897
- Place of birth: Lisbon, Portugal
- Position: Midfielder

Senior career*
Years	Team	Apps	(Gls)
- Benfica

International career
1922–1923	Portugal	2	(0)
- * Club domestic league appearances and goals

Fernando de Jesus (born 2 February 1897) was a Portuguese footballer who played as a forward.
