= António Pinho =

Portuguese footballer (1899–1999)

Personal information
- Date of birth: 25 February 1899
- Place of birth: Portugal
- Date of death: 24 February 1999 (aged 99)
- Position: Defender

Senior career*
Years	Team	Apps	(Gls)
1918–1920	Benfica	15	(0)
1920–1927	Casa Pia		
1927–1930	Benfica	20	(0)

International career
1921–1929	Portugal	12	(0)
- * Club domestic league appearances and goals

António Pinho (25 February 1899 – 24 February 1999) was a Portuguese footballer who played as defender.

== International career ==
Pinho played in Portugal's first ever international game, on 18 December 1921 in Madrid against Spain, a match which Portugal lost 1–3. He gained a total 12 caps for the national team.
