= Francisco Vieira =

Portuguese footballer

Personal information
- Date of birth: 26 August 1899
- Place of birth: Portugal
- Date of death: Unknown
- Position: Goalkeeper

Senior career*
Years	Team	Apps	(Gls)
1917–1926	Benfica		

International career
1923–1925	Portugal	3	(0)
- * Club domestic league appearances and goals

Francisco Vieira (26 August 1899 – deceased) was a Portuguese footballer who played as a goalkeeper.

== Honours ==
Benfica

- Taça de Honra (1)
