= José do Canto =

Portuguese landowner and intellectual

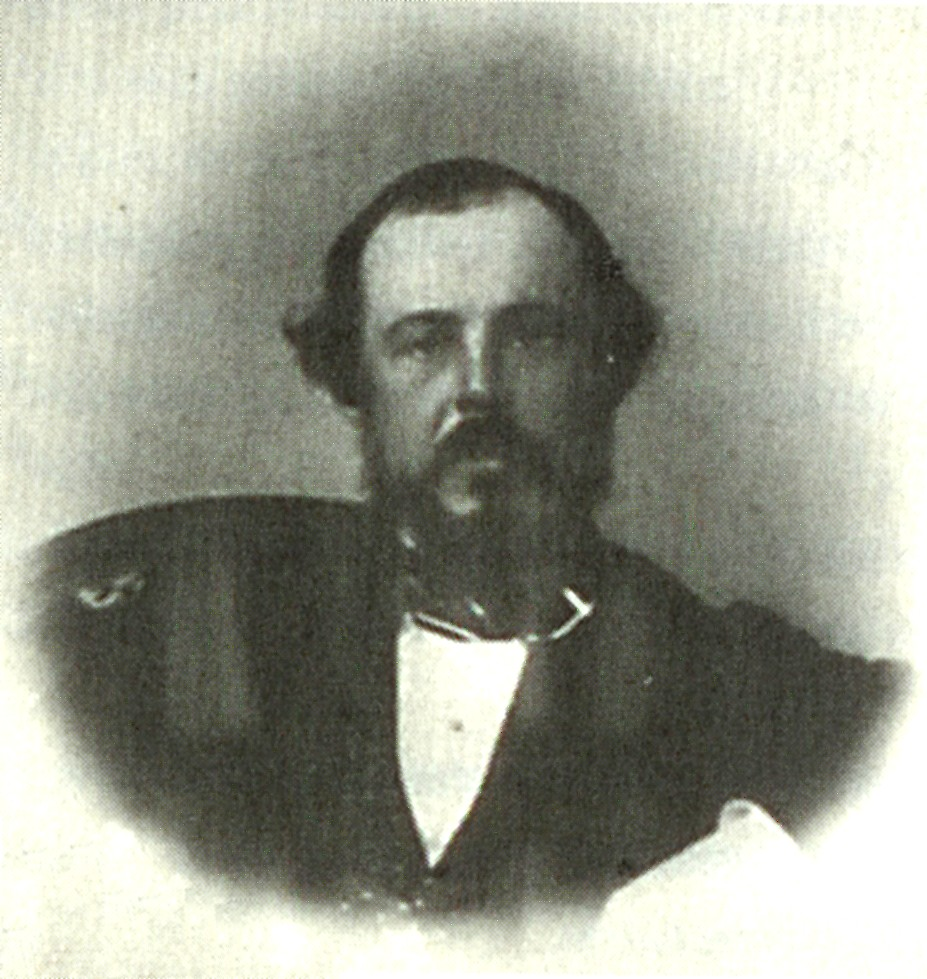
- Born: 20 December 1820; Ponta Delgada, São Miguel, Portugal
- Died: 10 July 1898 (aged 77); Ponta Delgada, São Miguel, Portugal
- Resting place: Chapel of Nossa Senhora das Vitórias, Furnas; 37°45′1.42″N 25°19′57.28″W
- Citizenship: Portuguese
- Education: University of Coimbra
- Years active: 1840 - 1898
- Spouse: Maria Guilhermina Taveira Brum da Silveira

José do Canto (20 December 1820, in Ponta Delgada – 10 July 1898, in Ponta Delgada) was a Portuguese landowner and intellectual who distinguished himself as a bibliographer and promoter of new agricultural technologies and species into the Azores. He was a renowned gardener and botanist responsible for the creation of botanical garden, that later bore his name (Jardim José do Canto), in Ponta Delgada. He was also a philosophical romantic and fan of Luís de Camões; his holdings included a large number of rare books in various languages, which were incorporated into the Azorean public library and regional archive.

José do Canto was the son José Caetano Dias do Canto e Medeiros, a rich politician, and wife Margarida Isabel Botelho, both connected to the more important and rich families on the islands of São Miguel and Faial. He was the brother of the bibliographer Ernesto do Canto.

His father was culturally well-educated for the time, and was directly responsible for the education of his children. Young José began his studies at the age of 5 years, supported by a keen intellect, that allowed him to vault over the weak system of education in the public system at the time. He demonstrated a great intelligence and application, easily learning Latin and completing his studies by the age of 9 years. José was also able, at ten years, to read the works of Cato the Younger in the original Latin. José Caetano sent his son to Paris in 1838, to the Colégio de Fontenay-aux-Roses, then led by the Miguelist friar José da Sacra Famíl, but José did not adapt to his environment and quickly returned to the Azores.

In 1840, he began his studies at the University of Coimbra in the Faculty of Mathematics, briefly interrupted by his arranged marriage to a rich heiress of local winemaker with lands in São Miguel and Faial, D. Maria Guilhermina Taveira Brum da Silveira. At the time, she was only 15 years old and he was 7 years her senior, but immediately set about administering the large holdings that pertained to his young wife. With a great determination and vision, he introduced many changes to the properties and initiated new agricultural techniques into production.

Unlike many of his contemporaries, he was never interested in politics. When he was asked to be a deputy in the local assembly, he refused, and published a small manifesto on the reasons for declining the invitation. In all, he had a role in influencing the Portuguese government into authorizing the construction of a port for Ponta Delgada. But even with his aversion to politics, he did preside in the Junta Geral in the District of Ponta Delgada in 1878.

José do Canto was charitable philanthropist, financing social institutions, including one in Ribeira Grande. He was a partner in the Lisbon Science Academy, elected on July 9, 1897 and received many scientific and cultural awards for his contributions.

== Gardener and botanist ==
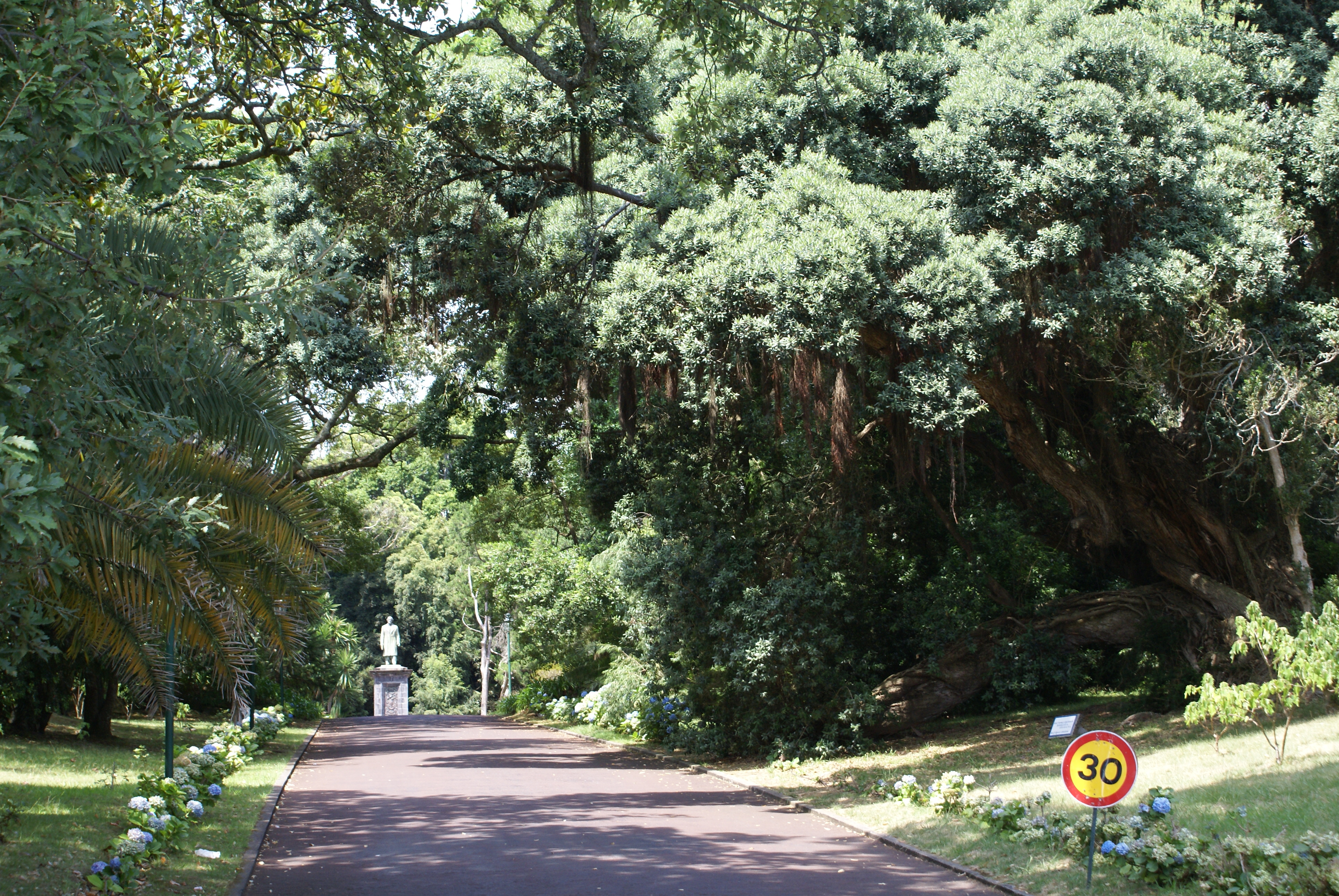
Botanical Garden José do Canto entranceway, with monument to José do Canto

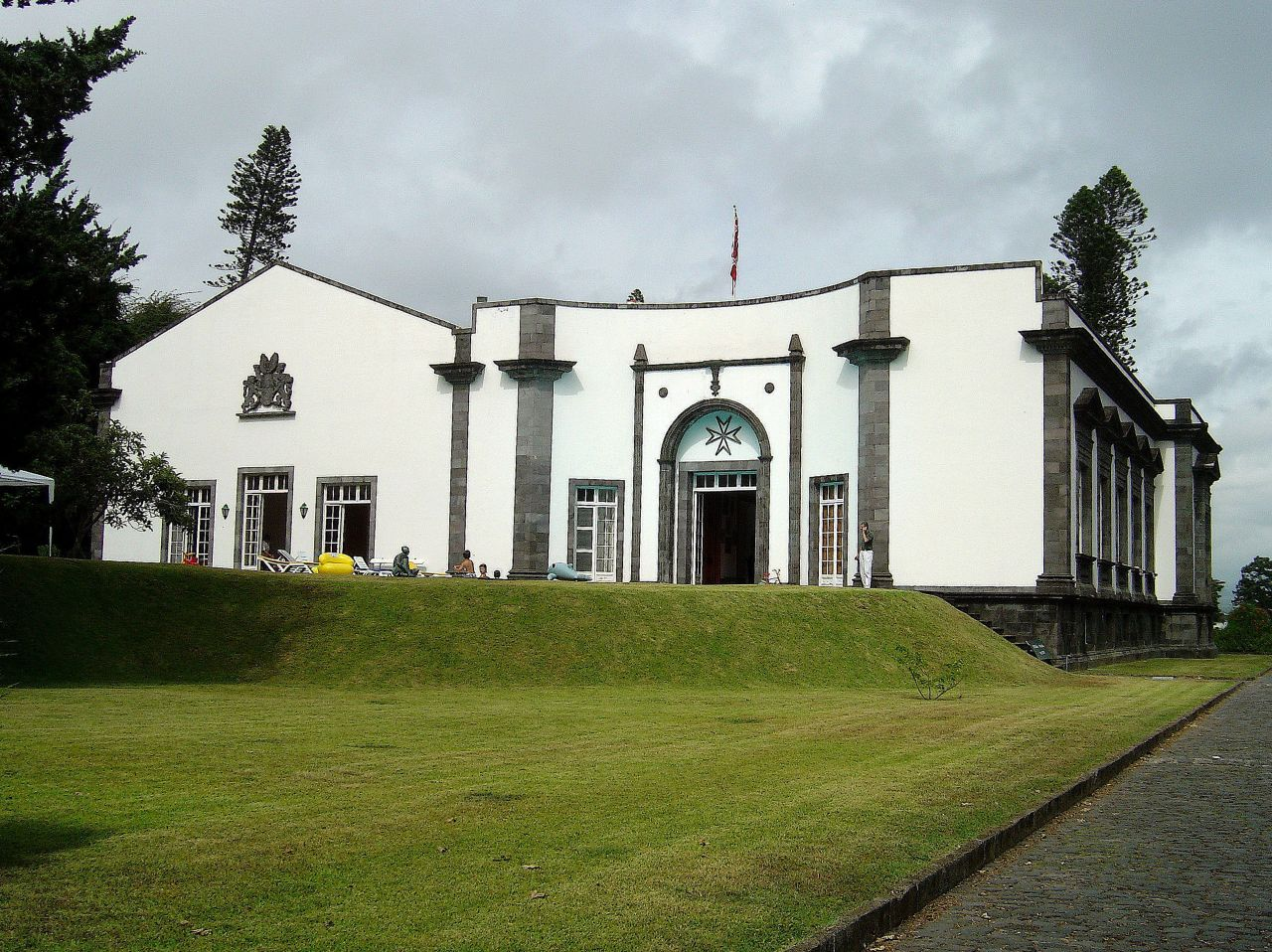
The manor house built by José do Canto within his holdings in Santana

He contracted foreign technicians, investigates the research of international agricultural specialists, and initiates a tentative reform in the Micalense practices used on his families' lands. In order to mobilize forces in his project, he promotes the founding of the 'Sociedade Promotora da Agricultura Micaelense (English: Promotional Society of Micalense Agriculture), while developing new agricultural species and techniques. José do Canto helped publish the periodical Agricultor Micaelense, a mouthpiece of the Society, and likely one of the first Portuguese agricultural publications. Among the new cultures installed under his supervision were the cultivation of pineapple and tea. On his properties, near and around Ponta Delgada and Furnas, he would acclimatize and seed several plant species, including the Camellia and Cryptomeria, today both found throughout the archipelago.

Interested in gardens, gardening and botany, José do Canto conceived the construction of a large park, on the English-style, in the areas north of Ponta Delgada, on lands that pertained to his wife. Today, known as Jardim José do Canto, near the old chapel of Santana, the park is an example of the Victorian garden park, with an abundance of botanical species and rich manicured grounds. Its construction began in 1845, under the supervision of José do Canto and his London architect David Mocatta, and comprises 6 hectares and more the 6000 species of trees and bush species, representing a cross-section of period gardens created by many of the Azorean families after the 18th century. It shares a contiguous border with the gardens of the Palace of Santana, the residence of the President of the Government of the Azores, and within its walls there are many constructions, including the monument to José do Canto, a manor home (in the 18th century-style), an old Victorian-esque greenhouse adapted as a pavilion, and the aforementioned Chapel of Santana (constructed in the 17th century). These structures, park and Palace grounds have been classified as an Imóvel de Interesse Público (English: Property of Public Interest) by the government of the Azores, and functions as a local tourist attraction in Ponta Delgada by the Regional Government.

== Architecture ==
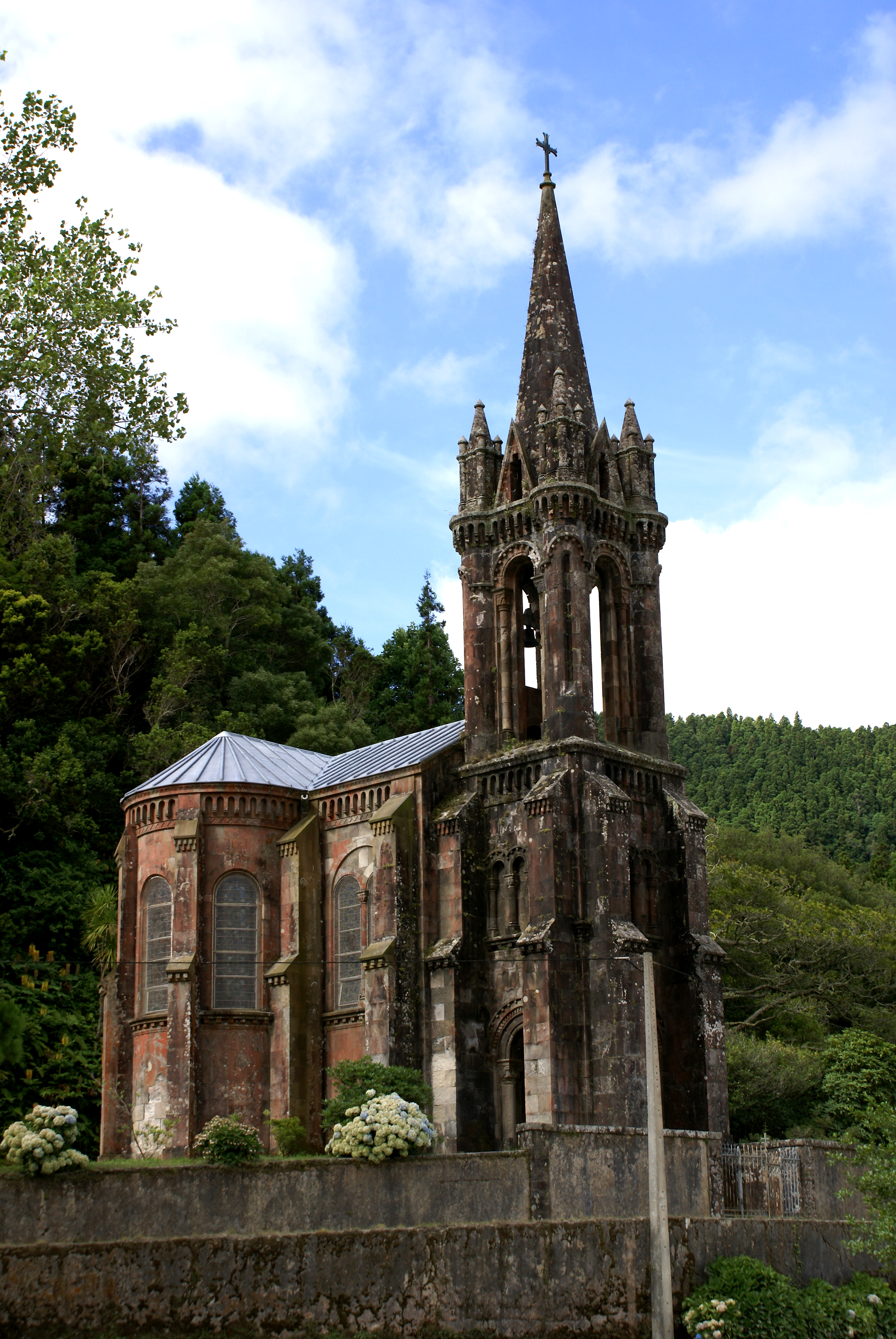
Chapel of Nossa Senhora das Vitórias, built by José do Canto beside Furnas Lake, as a mausoleum

José do Canto is also credited with the construction of the Chapel of Nossa Senhora das Vitórias (English: Our Lady of Victories), on the margins of Furnas lake (Portuguese: Lagoa das Furnas). The chapel in a French neo-Gothic-style has been similarly classified as Imovel de Interresse Público. Around the chapel there is also another park, similarly constructed by José do Canto in order to acclimatize new plants that he imported.

== Bibliographer ==
José do Canto was also a bibliographer, and fan of Luís de Camões, who collected a personal library of 18,000 titles, edited during the 18th century, including a first-edition example of the Os Lusíadas. The collection resulted from successive purchases made in the Azores and in various book-dealers throughout Portugal, France and England. His collection, since May 1942, has been an integral part of the collection of the Biblioteca Pública e Arquivo Regional de Ponta Delgada (English: Public Library and Regional Archive of Ponta Delgada). José do Canto's collection of writings by Camões, which includes various public editions of the Os Lusíadas until 1898 (his death) totaling 110 editions, published between 1572 and 1892. Also included were 105 editions in various languages, including Hungarian, German, English, French, Italian, Spanish, Russian and Japanese.

The collection contains the first-editions of José do Canto's contemporary authors, such as Alexandre Herculano, Antero de Quental, Camilo Castelo Branco and Eça de Queirós, as well as the first editions of works by Charles Darwin, Alexandre Dumas and Alexandre Dumas.

== Family ==
Like his father before him, José do Canto sent his two sons to study in France and Germany. They died early in their lives, leaving no direct male heirs. He had three daughters. José do Canto died, an unhappy man, and was buried next to his wife within the Chapel he constructed, which he had specifically erected to serve as a mausoleum for his family.

== Sources ==
- do Canto, José (1852). Aos micaelenses que pretendiam eleger-me deputado [The Micalense that Would Elect Me Deputy] (in Portuguese). Ponta Delgada, Azores: Tipografia Manuel Cardoso Albergaria e Vale.
- Inventário da Correspondência de José do Canto Existente na sua Livraria [Inventory of the Correspondence of José do Canto existent in his Libraries] (in Portuguese), Ponta Delgada, Azores: Biblioteca Pública e Arquivo de Ponta Delgada, 1998
- de Ataíde, Augusto, ed. (2000). José do Canto no centenário da sua morte [José do Canto, on the Centenary of His Death] (in Portuguese). Ponta Delgada, Azores: Instituto Cultural de Ponta Delgada. ISBN 972-9216-74-6.
- Riley, Carlos Guilherme (October 2001). "José do Canto, um gentleman farmer açoriano" [José do Canto, An Azorean Gentleman Farmer]. Análise Social (in Portuguese) (36) (160 ed.): 685–710. ISSN 0003-2573.
- Riley, Carlos Guilherme (2001). "José do Canto : retrato de um cavalheiro na primavera da vida". Arquipélago. História. 2 (in Portuguese). 5. Ponta Delgada (Azores), Portugal: University of the Azores: 211–264. hdl:10400.3/340. ISSN 0871-7664.
- Goeze, Edmond (1867). A Ilha de São Miguel e o Jardim Botânico de Coimbra [The Island of São Miguel and the Botanical Gard of Coimbra] (in Portuguese). Coimbra, Portugal: Imprensa da Universidade.
- Medeiros Sousa, Fernando Aires de (1982). José do Canto: subsídios para a história micaelense 1820-1898 [José do Canto: Stories on Micalense History] (in Portuguese). Ponta Delgada, Azores: Universidade dos Açores.
- Correia, Jácome (1915). Cartas particulares do sr. José do Canto aos srs. José Jácome Correia e Conde de Jácome Correia (1841 a 1893) [Specific Letters of Mr. José do Canto to Mr. José Jácome Correia and the Count of Jácome Correia (1841-1893)] (in Portuguese). Ponta Delgada, Azores.
- Mónica, Maria Filomena (2000). José do Canto no Centenário da sua Morte [José do Canto on the Centenary of His Death] (in Portuguese). Ponta Delgada, Azores: Instituto Cultural de Ponta Delgada.
- Mónica, Maria Filomena (October 2001). "Recensão da obra: José do Canto-Subsídios para a História Micaelense, 1820-1898, de Fernando Aires de Medeiros Sousa" [Notes on the Work 'José do Canto: Lettes on Micalense History (1820-1898)]. Análise Social (in Portuguese) (36) (160 ed.).
- Dias, Urbano de Mendonça (2005). Literatos dos Açores (in Portuguese) (2 ed.). Vila Franca do Campo, Azores: Editorial Ilha Nova. pp. 449–454.
