= José Pimenta =

Portuguese footballer (1899–?)

Personal information
- Date of birth: 30 December 1899
- Place of birth: Portugal
- Date of death: after 1928
- Position: Forward

Senior career*
Years	Team	Apps	(Gls)
10 (1918–1928)	Benfica	75	(5)
- * Club domestic league appearances and goals

José Pimenta (born 30 December 1899 – after 1928) was a Portuguese footballer who played as a forward for Benfica. He was also in the military.

He made his debut on Benfica on 29 December 1918 in Lisbon, against Sporting, in a 3-1 victory. The next year he won the 1919–20 edition of the regional championship Campeonato de Lisboa.

By 1925, he was the captain of Benfica's team. He retired in 1928, concluding his decade-long career in the club.
