= Carlos Guimarães =

Portuguese footballer (1898–deceased)

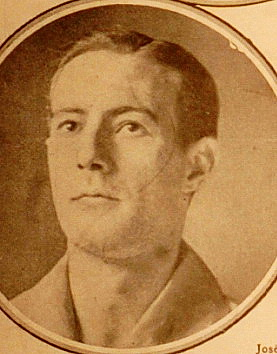

Personal information
- Date of birth: 18 February 1898
- Place of birth: Portugal
- Date of death: Deceased
- Position: Goalkeeper

Senior career*
Years	Team	Apps	(Gls)
- CIF

International career
1921–1922	Portugal	2	(0)
- * Club domestic league appearances and goals

Carlos Guimarães (18 February 1898 – deceased) was a Portuguese footballer who played as goalkeeper.
