= José María Sá Lemos =

Portuguese sculptor

José María Sá Lemos (1892–1971) was a Portuguese sculptor.
