= Fernando António =

Portuguese footballer

Personal information
- Date of birth: 30 April 1899
- Place of birth: Portugal
- Date of death: Deceased
- Position: Forward

Senior career*
Years	Team	Apps	(Gls)
- Belenenses

International career
1923	Portugal	1	(0)
- * Club domestic league appearances and goals

Fernando António (born 30 April 1899 - deceased) was a Portuguese footballer who played as a forward.
