= José Ramos (Portuguese footballer) =

Portuguese footballer (1899–??)

Personal information
- Date of birth: 21 April 1899
- Place of birth: Portugal
- Date of death: Deceased
- Position: Forward

Senior career*
Years	Team	Apps	(Gls)
- Marítimo

International career
1926	Portugal	1	(0)
- * Club domestic league appearances and goals

José Ramos (born 21 April 1899 - deceased) was a Portuguese footballer who played as a forward.
