= José Gralha =

Portuguese footballer

Personal information
- Full name: José Maria Gralha
- Date of birth: 22 August 1899
- Place of birth: Lisbon, Portugal
- Date of death: 6 June 1944 (aged 44)
- Position: Forward

Senior career*
Years	Team	Apps	(Gls)
- Casa Pia

International career
1921	Portugal	1	(0)
- * Club domestic league appearances and goals

José Maria Gralha (22 August 1899 – 6 June 1944) was a Portuguese footballer who played as a forward.
