= João Afonso da Costa de Sousa de Macedo, 1st Duke of Albuquerque =

Count of Mesquitela and Duke of Albuquerque

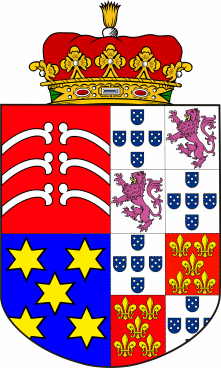
Coat of Arms of the Dukes of Albuquerque

Dom João Afonso da Costa de Sousa de Macedo (February 11, 1815 – September 24, 1890) was the 2nd Count of Mesquitela and 1st Duke of Albuquerque. Born and died in Lisbon, he was son of Luís da Costa de Sousa de Macedo e Albuquerque, the 1st Count of Mesquitela and Maria Inácia de Saldanha Oliveira e Daun, from the family of Marquis of Pombal.

== Biography ==
After his studies at the Nobility College (Colégio dos Nobres) in Lisbon, he travelled around Europe (visiting Spain, France and England) and was nominee attaché to the Portuguese embassy in Paris. After his father’s death in 1853, he returned to Portugal and he became 2nd Count of Mesquitela and 4th Viscount of Mesquitela, joining the Chamber of Peers (the upper house of the 19th century Portuguese Parliament).

He escorted Princess Stephanie of Hohenzollern-Sigmaringen during her disembarkation when she arrived in Lisbon to marry King Pedro V of Portugal. He had the same honour when Princess Maria Pia of Savoy landed in Lisbon to marry King Luis I of Portugal.

In 1870, he was invited to be foreign minister in the government of the Duke of Saldanha, who promised him the title of Duke. As he was not a politician, he refused both the post and the title.

He was highly regarded person in Portuguese society, and King Luis I of Portugal, by a royal decree dated from May 19, 1886, granted him the title of Duke of Albuquerque.

He did not marry and had no children.

== Other titles ==
He held peerages both in the United Kingdom of Great Britain and Ireland and the Kingdom of Portugal:

- 2nd Count of Mesquitela;
- 4th Viscount of Mesquitela;
- 6th Baron of Mullingar (Ireland)
- Lord of the Quinta da Bacalhoa
- King of Arms from the Portuguese Royal Household
- Grand Cross of the Order of the Immaculate Conception of Vila Viçosa
- Grand Cross of the Order of Christ
- Grand Cross of the Order of Charles III.

== Bibliography ==
"Nobreza de Portugal e Brasil" - Vol II, page 215. Published by Zairol Lda., Lisbon 1989
