= António Leite (fencer) =

Portuguese fencer

Personal information
- Born: 21 August 1899 Twickenham, England
- Died: 26 April 1958 (aged 58) Lisbon, Portugal

Sport
- Sport: Fencing

António Leite (21 August 1899 – 26 April 1958) was a Portuguese fencer. He competed in the team Épée event at the 1924 Summer Olympics.
