= Antonia Ferreira =

Portuguese businesswoman and winemaker (1811 - 1896)

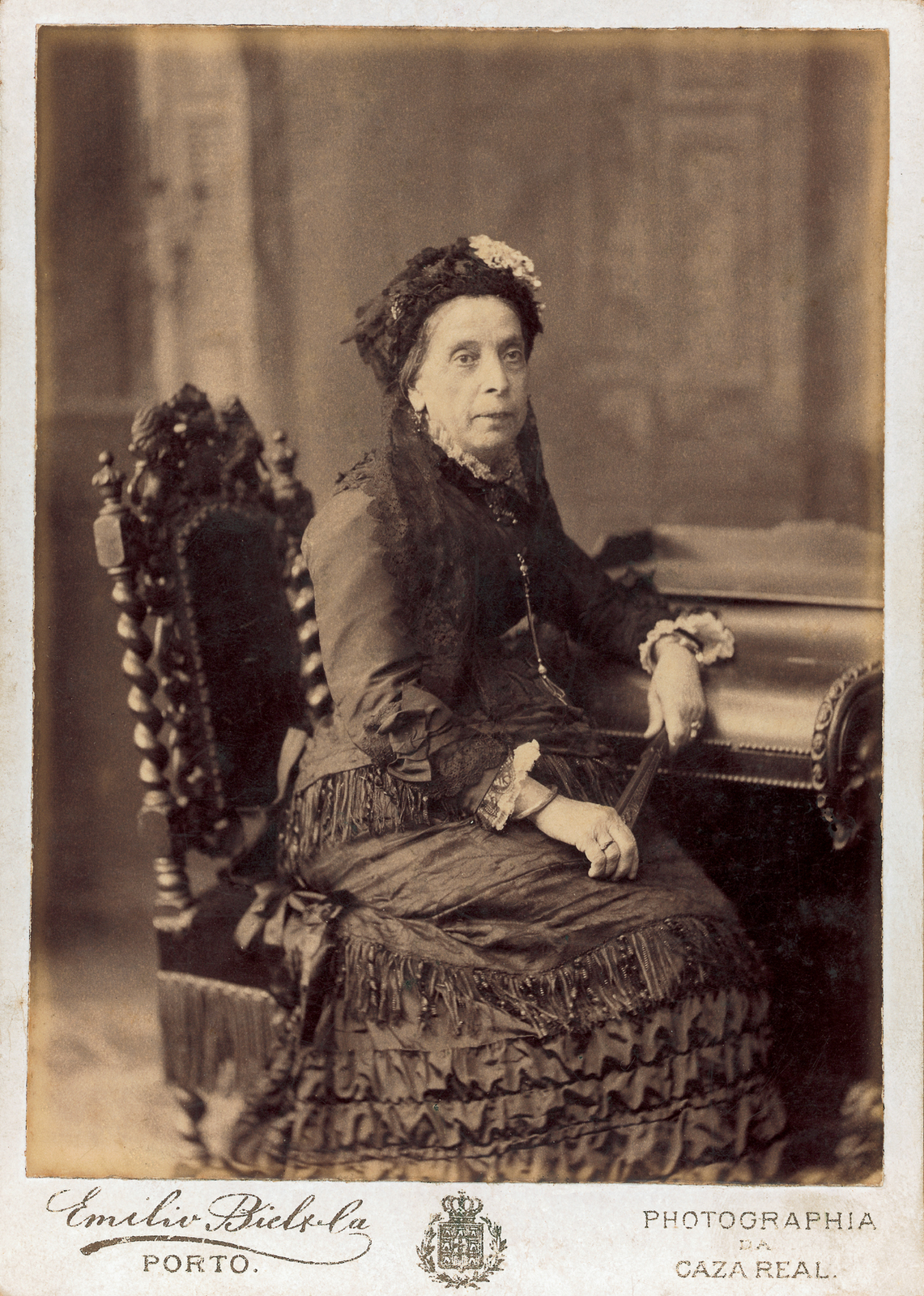
Antónia Adelaide Ferreira

Antónia Adelaide Ferreira (Godim, Peso da Régua, July 4, 1811 — Godim, Peso da Régua, March 26, 1896), often referred to in Portugal as "Ferreirinha", was a Portuguese businesswoman. She is known for leadership in the cultivation of port wine and for the winemaking innovations she introduced to Portugal.

== Life ==
Ferreira began her career in the wine industry when she inherited many vineyards from her wealthy family. Her father arranged for her to marry a cousin, but he was uninterested in the family business and wasted a large part of her fortune. The marriage produced two children: a daughter, Maria de Assunção, later known as the Countess of Azambuja, and one son, António Bernardo Ferreira. She was widowed at age 33, at which point she began to exercise her role as executive of the family estates.

Ferreira received her nickname, Ferreirinha (an affectionate diminutive of her name in Portuguese), for her devotion and care for the working families who farmed her lands and vineyards. She was supported in her business efforts by her administrator José da Silva Torres, who eventually became her second husband.

Ferreira fought against the lack of support for local viticulture in the Portuguese government; during the time much Portuguese wine was imported from Spain. She also fought against the phylloxera pestilence which eventually destroyed much of European grapes, including those in Portugal and her own vineyards. Ferreira traveled to England to learn the most modern and efficacious techniques to battle the disease and import them back to Portugal; she also learned and imported new processes for wine production. The Ferreirinha invested in many new vineyards, especially in areas with large exposure to sunlight, although she maintained the original vineyards she had inherited in northern Portugal. Most of her wine was exported to England, the first major importer of port wine.

When she died in 1896, Ferreira left behind a large fortune and near thirty vineyards. She is considered one of the leaders in the history of the Douro valley and an influence in to the continued popularity and success of Portuguese wines, surviving through the phylloxera blight of the late 19th century.

In 2004 a Portuguese television series provided a fictional re-enactment of her life.
