= José Dias Ferreira =

Portuguese lawyer, politician and jurist

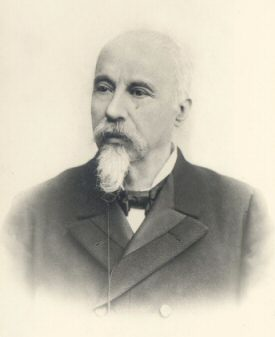

Prime Minister of Portugal
- In office 18 January 1892 – 22 February 1893
- Monarch: Carlos I
- Preceded by: João Crisóstomo
- Succeeded by: Ernesto Hintze Ribeiro

Personal details
- Born: 30 November 1837 Arganil, Portugal
- Died: 8 September 1909 (aged 71) Vidago, Portugal
- Party: Independent
- Relations: Manuela Ferreira Leite (great-granddaughter)

José Dias Ferreira GCTE (30 November 1837 in Arganil, Pombeiro da Beira – 8 September 1909 in Vidago) was a Portuguese lawyer, politician and jurist, son of António Ferreira Dias (São Martinho, Urgueira, c. 1815 – Aldeia Nova, 27 August 1880) and wife Bernarda Pereira de Vasconcelos (c. 1810 – ?).

He served as a Minister, 18th (4 January 1868), 27th (26 May 1870) and 48th (27 May 1892) Minister for Treasury Affairs and Prime Minister of Portugal from 1892 to 1893 and was the country's most influential civil law scholar during the late 19th century. He was also the 250th Grand Cross of the Order of the Tower and Sword.

Political offices
Preceded by João Crisóstomo de Abreu e Sousa	Prime Minister of Portugal (President of the Council of Ministers); 1892–1893	Succeeded by Ernesto Hintze Ribeiro
