= João Crisóstomo de Abreu e Sousa =

Portuguese politician (1811–1895)

General João Crisóstomo de Abreu e Sousa
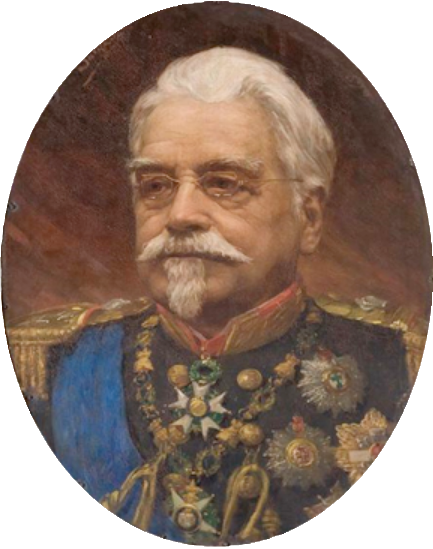

Prime Minister of Portugal
- In office 11 October 1890 – 18 January 1892
- Monarch: Carlos I
- Preceded by: António de Serpa Pimentel
- Succeeded by: José Dias Ferreira

President of the Chamber of Most Worthy Peers
- In office 3 May 1887 – 20 January 1890
- Monarchs: Luís I Carlos I
- Preceded by: Fontes Pereira de Melo
- Succeeded by: António Teles Pereira de Vasconcelos Pimentel

Minister of Public Works of Portugal
- In office 16 January 1864 – 17 April 1865
- Monarch: Luís I
- Prime Minister: Nuno José de Moura Barreto
- Preceded by: Nuno José de Moura Barreto (as acting)
- Succeeded by: Carlos Bento da Silva

Minister of Overseas and of the Navy of Portugal
- Acting
- In office 12 December 1864 – 5 March 1865
- Monarch: Luís I
- Prime Minister: Nuno José de Moura Barreto
- Preceded by: José da Silva Mendes Leal
- Succeeded by: Nuno José de Moura Barreto

Minister of War of Portugal
- In office 1 June 1879 – 29 November 1880
- Monarch: Carlos I
- Prime Minister: Anselmo José Braamcamp
- Preceded by: Fontes Pereira de Melo
- Succeeded by: José Joaquim de Castro
- In office 13 October 1890 – 17 January 1892
- Monarch: Carlos I
- Prime Minister: Himself
- Preceded by: António de Serpa Pimentel (as acting)
- Succeeded by: Jorge Pinheiro Furtado

Personal details
- Born: 27 January 1811 Lisbon, Kingdom of Portugal
- Died: 7 January 1895 (aged 83) Lisbon, Kingdom of Portugal
- Party: Independent
- Spouse: Casimira Lúcia da Rocha Ferreira
- Parent(s): João José de Sousa (father); Inácia Lima de Abreu (mother)

Military service
- Allegiance: (Kingdom of Portugal) Portugal
- Years of service: 1830–1895
- Rank: General
- Battles/wars: Liberal Wars

João Crisóstomo de Abreu e Sousa (27 January 1811 – 7 January 1895) was a Portuguese politician and army general who served as Prime Minister of Portugal from 14 October 1890 to 17 January 1892. Leading Portugal in the wake of the 1890 British Ultimatum, a financial crisis in 1891 led to the reformation of his government.

== Career ==
Crisóstomo was a member of the Advisory Junta for Public Works from 20 August to 12 October 1860, and 27 July 1866 to 28 July 1868. Crisóstomo became a member of the Chamber of Deputies in 1861. He was the Minister of Public Works from 16 January 1864 to 17 April 1865, and Minister of the Navy from 12 December 1864 to 4 March 1865. He was the Minister of War from 1 June 1879 to 29 January 1880.

On 13 October 1890, Crisóstomo became the President of the Council of Ministers. His first cabinet consisted of Minister for the Treasury Melo Gouveia, Minister for Public Works Tomás Ribeiro, Minister for Justice Sá Brandão, Minister for Foreign Affairs José Vicente Barbosa du Bocage, and Minister for the Navy António José Enes. Crisóstomo also served as Minister for War in his cabinet. Crisóstomo's government led Portugal following the 1890 British Ultimatum. A financial crisis occurred on 11 May 1891, and this led to the resignation of Crisóstomo's government.

A new government led by Crisóstomo was formed on 21 May 1891. His cabinet consisted of Minister for Justice Lopo Vaz, Minister for the Treasury Alberto António de Morais de Carvalho, Minister for the Navy Mariano de Carvalho, Minister of Foreign Affairs Júlio Vilhena, and Minister for Public Works João Franco. Crisóstomo also led the War and Public Education minisries.

== Political positions ==
Free trade and laissez-faire economics were favoured by Crisóstomo. He supported removing tariffs on cereal products in 1865.

== See also ==
- List of presidents of the Chamber of Most Worthy Peers (Kingdom of Portugal)

== Works cited ==
=== Journals ===
- Graça, João; Nunes, Teresa (2016). "The Liberal State, Economic Development and the Crisis of the 1890s: João Crisóstomo and José Frederico Laranjo". History of Economic Ideas. 24 (2). Accademia Editoriale: 111–140. doi:10.2307/44806066. JSTOR 44806066.

=== Web ===
- "João Crisóstomo (1811-1895)". Assembly of the Republic. Archived from the original on 17 June 2025.

Political offices
Preceded by António de Serpa Pimentel	Prime Minister of Portugal; 1890–1892	Succeeded by José Dias Ferreira
