= António de Serpa Pimentel =

Portuguese politician (1825–1900)

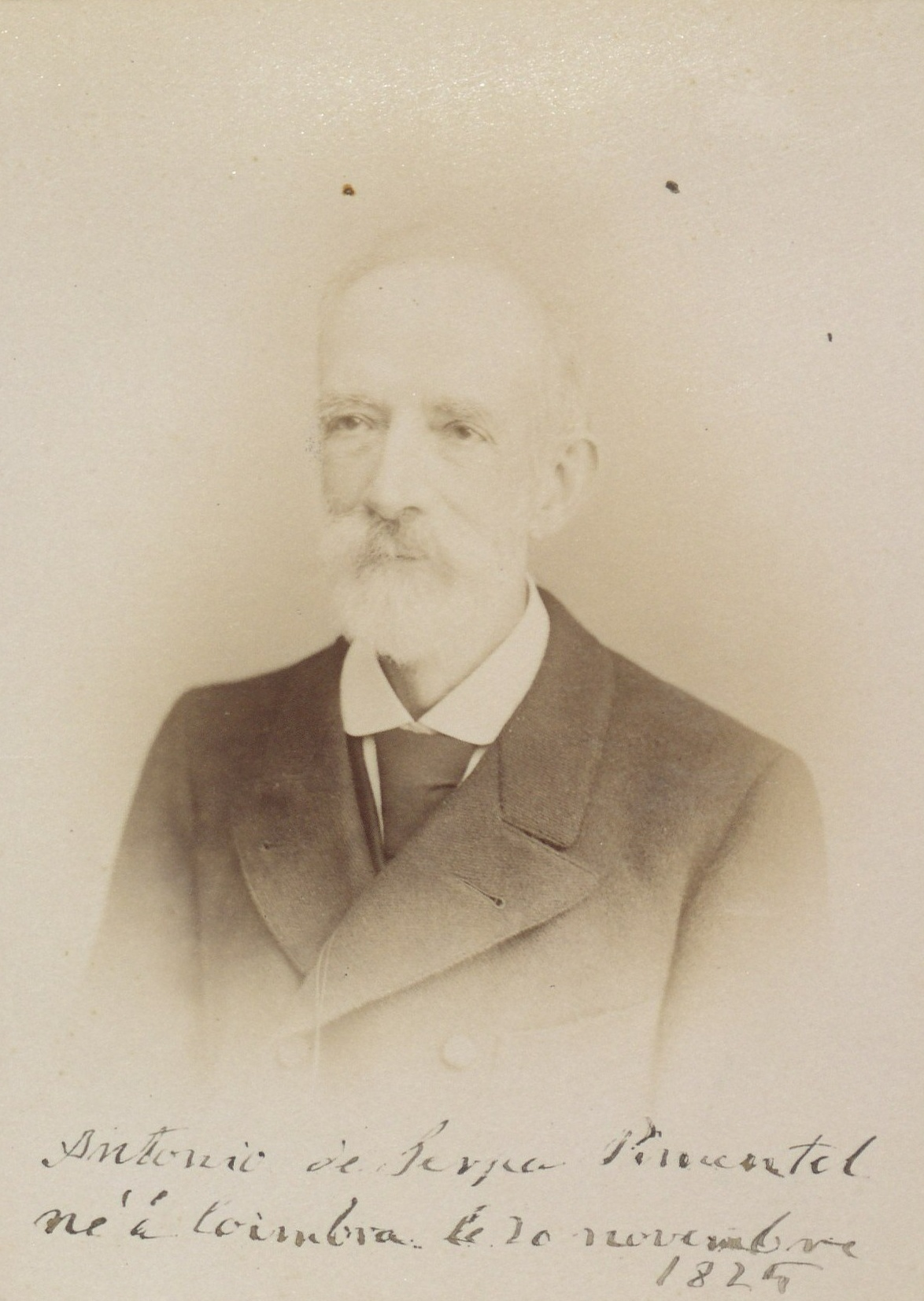
- Photograph by M. de Goes, c. 1900

Prime Minister of Portugal
- In office 14 January 1890 – 11 October 1890
- Monarch: Carlos I
- Preceded by: José Luciano de Castro
- Succeeded by: João Crisóstomo

Personal details
- Born: 20 November 1825 Coimbra, Kingdom of Portugal
- Died: 2 March 1900 (aged 74) Lisbon, Kingdom of Portugal
- Political party: Regenerator Party

António de Serpa Pimentel (20 November 1825 in Coimbra – 2 March 1900) was Prime Minister of Portugal from 14 January to 11 October 1890. His term in office began as a reaction to the British ultimatum concerning Portuguese colonial policy in southeast Africa. The signing of the Anglo-Portuguese Treaty later that year, which was intended as a step to resolve the crisis, was viewed as further appeasement of a powerful Britain. This led to his resignation and the fall of his government.

Political offices
| Preceded by José Luciano de Castro | Prime Minister of Portugal; 1886–1870 | Succeeded by João Crisóstomo de Abreu e Sousa |
