= Ernesto Hintze Ribeiro =

Portuguese politician, statesman and nobleman

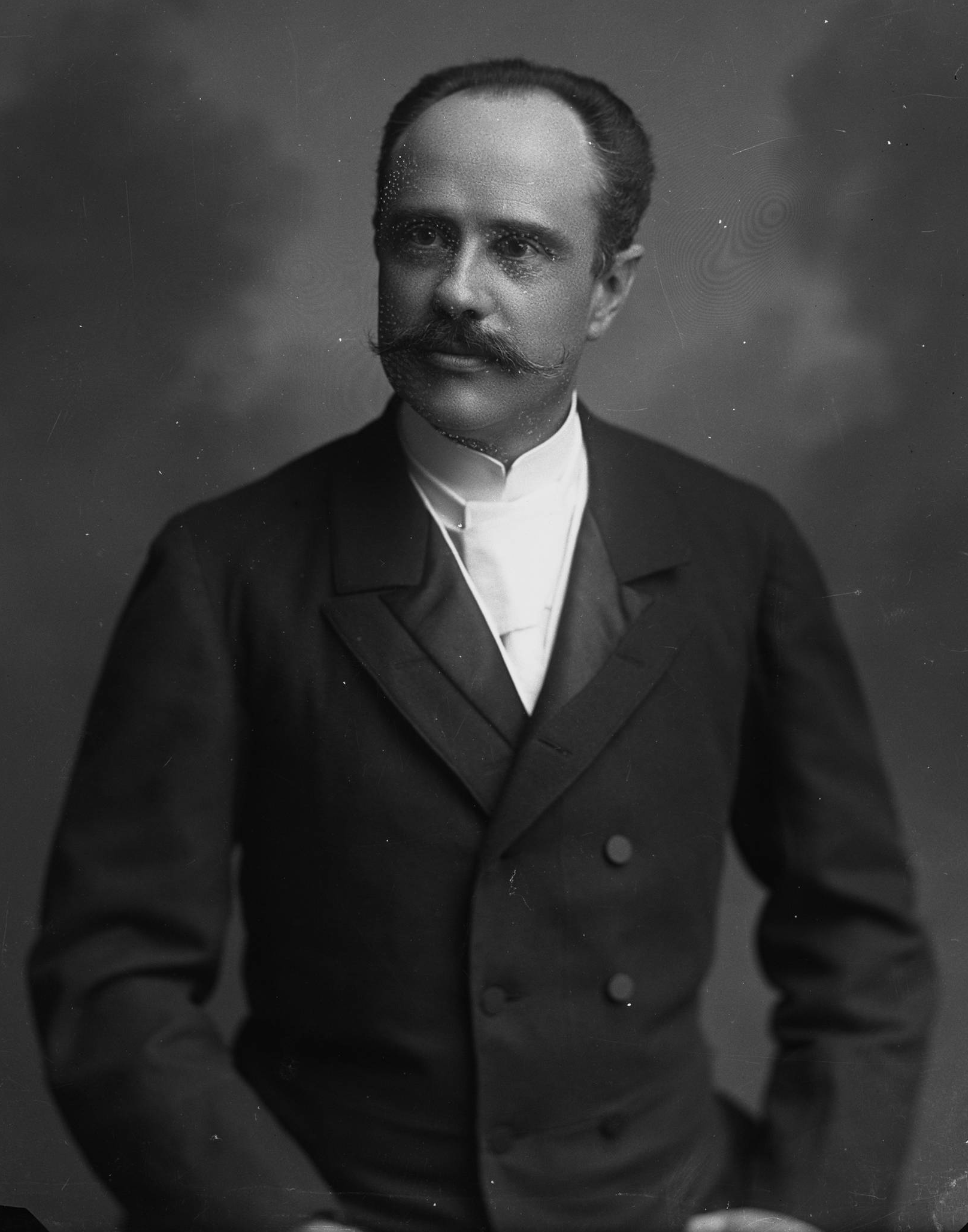
- Portrait by Octávio Bobone, c. 1907

Prime Minister of Portugal
- In office 20 March 1906 – 19 May 1906
- Monarch: Carlos
- Preceded by: José Luciano de Castro
- Succeeded by: João Franco
- In office 25 June 1900 – 20 October 1904
- Monarch: Carlos
- Preceded by: José Luciano de Castro
- Succeeded by: José Luciano de Castro
- In office 22 February 1893 – 7 February 1897
- Monarch: Carlos
- Preceded by: José Dias Ferreira
- Succeeded by: José Luciano de Castro

Personal details
- Born: 7 November 1849 Ponta Delgada, Azores Islands, Portugal
- Died: 1 August 1907 (aged 57) Lisbon, Portugal
- Party: Regenerator Party
- Spouse: Joana Rebelo de Chaves
- Education: University of Coimbra
- Occupation: Lawyer

Ernesto Rodolfo Hintze Ribeiro (Ponta Delgada, Azores, 7 November 1849 – Lisbon, 1 August 1907) was a Portuguese politician, statesman, and nobleman from the Azores, who served as Prime Minister of Portugal three times, during King Carlos I's reign.

A member of the Regenerator Party, Hintze Ribeiro's reforms in forestry, pharmacy, and autonomy for insular Portugal are the basis of these fields' policies today.

== Career ==
He was a prominent parliamentarian and Peer of the Realm, Attorney-General of the Crown, Minister of Public Works, of Finance and Foreign Affairs as well as uncontested leader of the Regenerator Party, holding the position of President of the Council of Ministers (Prime Minister) thrice (22 February 1893 – 7 February 1897, 25 June 1900 – 20 October 1904 and 20 March 1906 – 19 May 1906).

He was one of the dominant politicians of the final part of the Portuguese Constitutional Monarchy, occupying the post of Prime Minister longer than any other in his time. He was responsible for important reforms - some of which are still valid - such as the insular autonomy for the Azores and Madeira islands (1895), the pharmacies' law, and forest's law (1901).

He was made effective Councillor of State in 1891, received many decorations, among them the Great-Cross of the Order of the Tower and Sword. He was associate of the Royal Academy of Sciences.

A street in Ponta Delgada has been named in his honor.

Political offices
Preceded by José Dias Ferreira	President of the Council of Ministers; 1893–1896	Succeeded by José Luciano de Castro
Preceded by José Luciano de Castro	President of the Council of Ministers; 1900–1904	Succeeded by José Luciano de Castro
Preceded by José Luciano de Castro	President of the Council of Ministers; 1906	Succeeded by João Franco
