= José Luciano de Castro =

Portuguese politician, statesman, and journalist

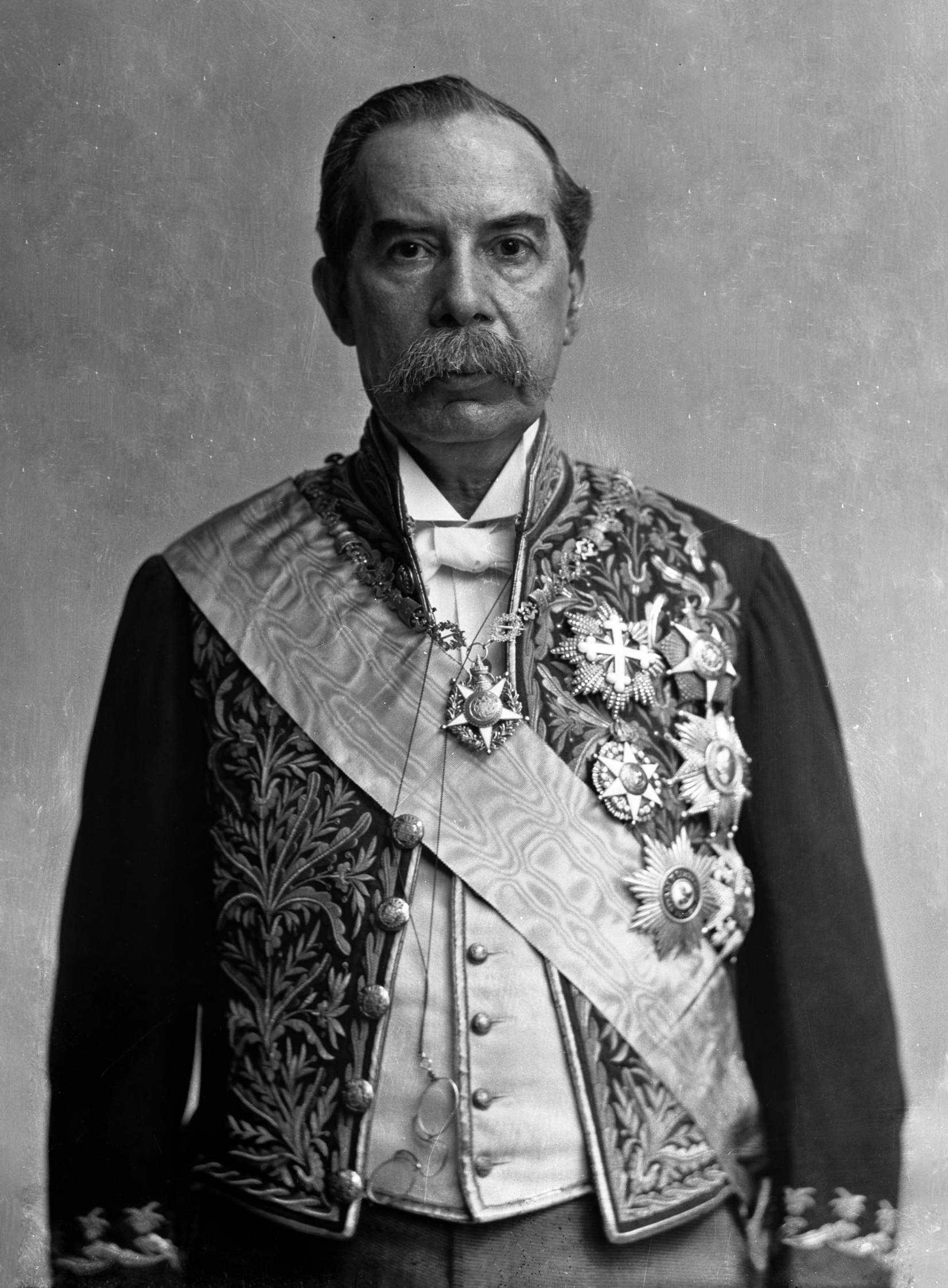
- Portrait taken by an unidentified photographer, 1890-1914

Prime Minister of Portugal
- In office 20 October 1904 – 19 March 1906
- Monarch: Carlos
- Preceded by: Ernesto Hintze Ribeiro
- Succeeded by: Ernesto Hintze Ribeiro
- In office 5 February 1897 – 26 July 1900
- Monarch: Carlos
- Preceded by: Ernesto Hintze Ribeiro
- Succeeded by: Ernesto Hintze Ribeiro
- In office 20 February 1886 – 14 January 1890
- Monarchs: Luís; Carlos
- Preceded by: Fontes Pereira de Melo
- Succeeded by: António de Serpa Pimentel

Personal details
- Born: 14 December 1834 Oliveirinha, Portugal
- Died: 9 March 1914 (aged 79) Anadia, Portugal
- Party: Progressist

José Luciano de Castro Pereira Corte Real (14 December 1834 – 9 March 1914) was a Portuguese politician, statesman, and journalist who served three times as Prime Minister of Portugal. He was one of the founders of the Progressist Party, of which he was the leader from the time of Anselmo José Braamcamp's death in 1885, onward.

Castro was the head of government during the Pink Map crisis and the subsequent 1890 British Ultimatum. The crisis was one of the factors that proved decisive in the fall of the Portuguese constitutional monarchy on 5 October 1910.

Political offices
Preceded by Fontes Pereira de Melo	Prime Minister of Portugal; 1886–1890	Succeeded by António de Serpa Pimentel
Preceded by Ernesto Hintze Ribeiro	Prime Minister of Portugal; 1897–1900	Succeeded by Ernesto Hintze Ribeiro
Preceded by Ernesto Hintze Ribeiro	Prime Minister of Portugal; 1904–1906	Succeeded by Ernesto Hintze Ribeiro
