= 1869 Portuguese legislative election =

- 11 April 1869

All 107 seats in the Chamber of Deputies 54 seats needed for a majority
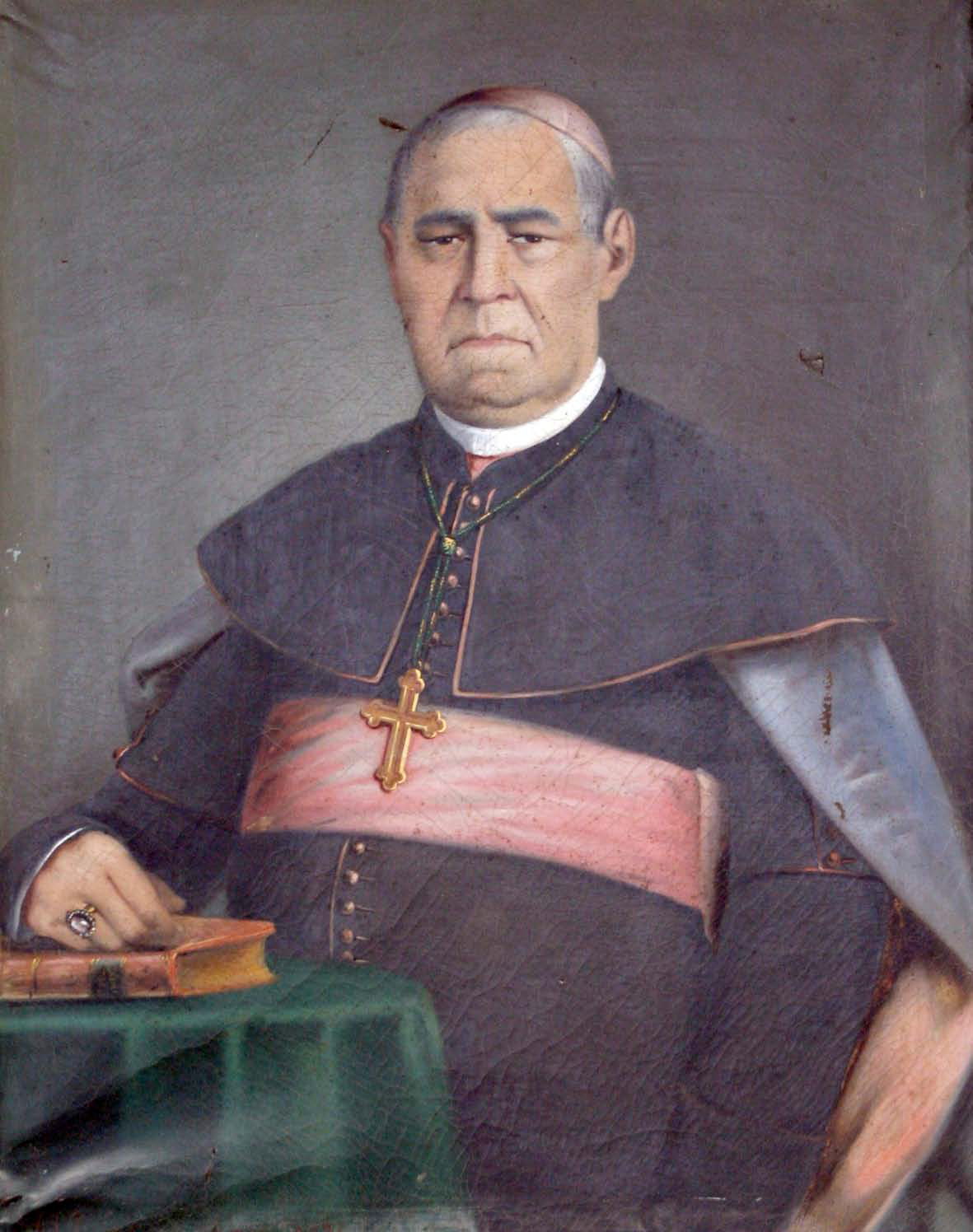

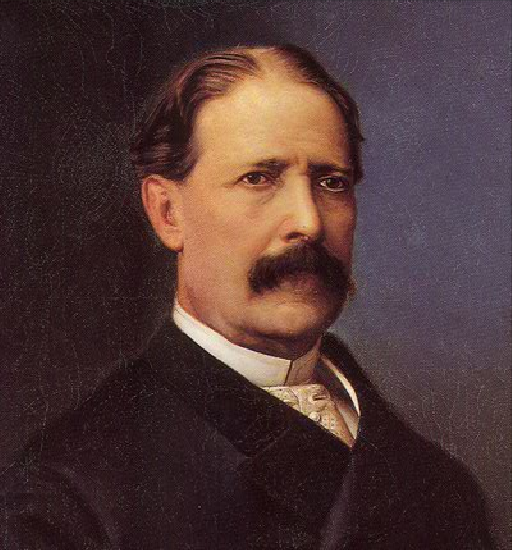

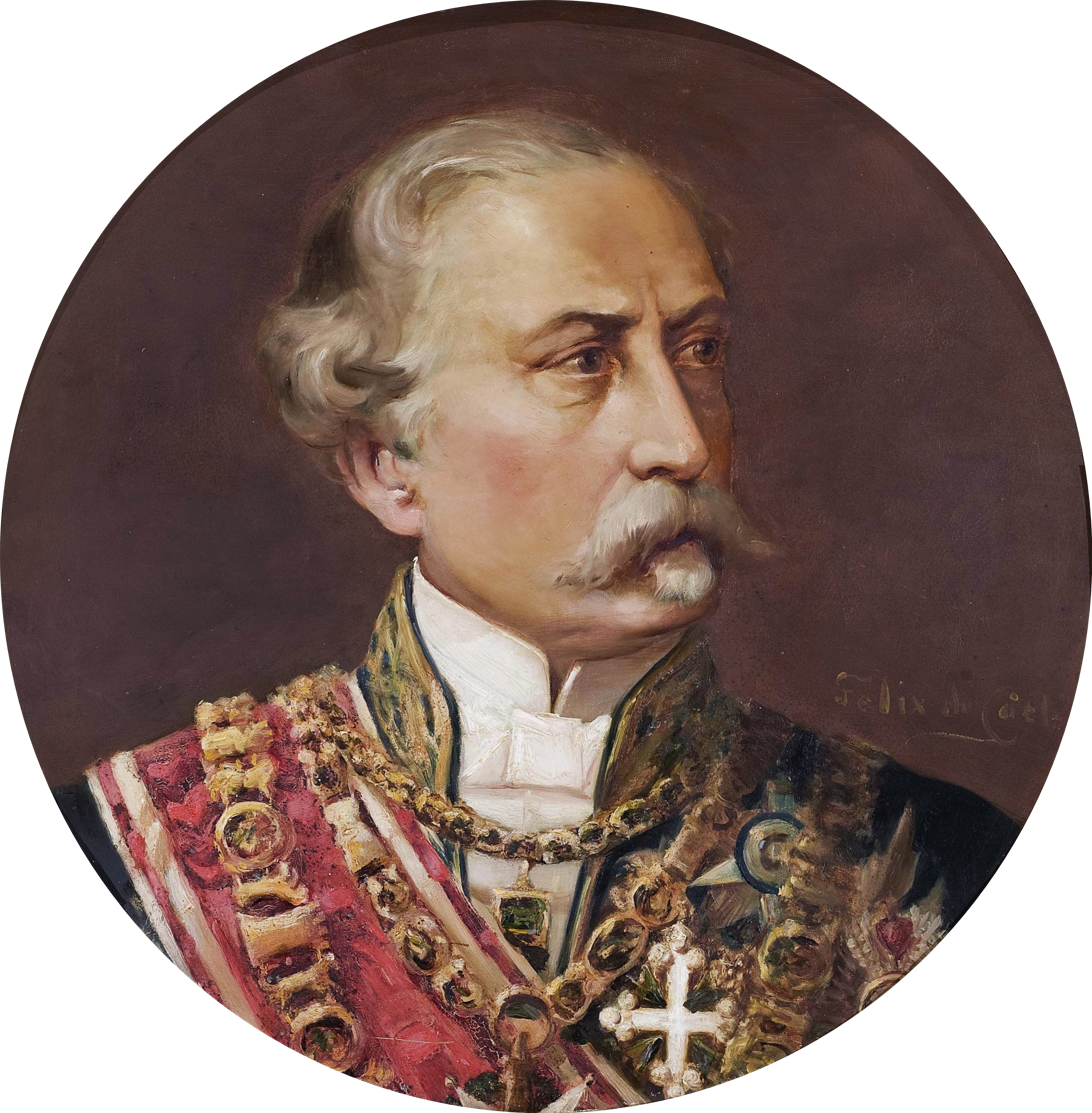
	First party	Second party	Third party
Leader	António Alves Martins	1st Duke of Loulé	Fontes Pereira de Melo
Party	Reformist	Historic	Regenerator
Last election	157 seats	9 seats	13 seats
Seats won	79	20	5
Seats after	▼78	▲11	▼8
Prime Minister before election
1st Marquis of Sá da Bandeira
Reformist
Prime Minister after election
1st Duke of Loulé
Historic

Parliamentary elections were held in Portugal on 11 April 1869.

== Results ==
Party	Votes	%	Seats
Reformist Party			79
Historic Party			20
Regenerator Party			5
Others			3
Total			107
Total votes	222,055	–	
Registered voters/turnout	368,237	60.30	
Source: ISCSP, Nohlen & Stöver
