= Portuguese Republican Party =

Defunct political party in Portugal

Portuguese Republican Party Partido Republicano Português
- Founded: 25 March 1876
- Dissolved: 1912 (de facto); 1926 (de jure)
- Succeeded by: Democratic Party; Republican Evolutionist Party; Republican Union Party
- Headquarters: Lisbon
- Ideology: Republicanism; Anti-clericalism; Secularism; Classical radicalism
- Political position: Centre to centre-left
- Slogan: Pátria e Liberdade ("Fatherland and Liberty")

Party flag

The Portuguese Republican Party (Portuguese: Partido Republicano Português, pronounced [pɐɾˈtiðu ʁɛpuβliˈkɐnu puɾtuˈɣeʃ]) was a Portuguese political party formed during the late years of the constitutional monarchy that proposed and later brought about the replacement of the monarchy with the Portuguese First Republic.

When the Republic was established on the 5 October 1910 Revolution, the members of the party initially stood together, but soon began splitting into different parties, including the Democratic Party, Republican Union, and Evolutionist Party, some of which themselves later merged or split to form the Democratic Leftwing Republican Party, Reformist Party, Centrist Republican Party, Popular Party, Radical Party, Republican Liberal Party, Liberal Republican Union, Reconstitution Party and Nationalist Republican Party.

== Notable members ==
- Afonso Costa
- José Relvas
- Teófilo Braga
- Manuel de Arriaga
- Manuel de Brito Camacho
- António José de Almeida

== Electoral performance ==
Election	Votes	%	Seats (Note: From 1878 to 1908 the 6 seats representing overseas territories are excluded, and from 1884 to 1895 the 6 seats elected at the national level are excluded.)	Result
Kingdom of Portugal
1878			1 / 137	Opposition
1879			1 / 137	Opposition
1881			1 / 137	Opposition
1884			2 / 151	Opposition
1887			2 / 152	Opposition
1889			2 / 152	Opposition
1890			4 / 152	Opposition
1892			4 / 152	Opposition
1894			2 / 152	Opposition
1895	Boycotted		0 / 114	No seats
1897	Boycotted		0 / 114	No seats
1899			3 / 138	Opposition
1900			0 / 138	No seats
1901			0 / 148	No seats
1904	Boycotted		0 / 148	No seats
1905			0 / 148	No seats
April 1906			1 / 148 (Note: The Republican candidate elected in April 1906 refused to take his seat in the Chamber of Deputies as a protest against electoral fraud)	Opposition
August 1906			4 / 148	Opposition
1908			7 / 148	Opposition
1910			14 / 155	Election annulled following a coup d'état
Republic of Portugal
1911 (constituent assembly)			229 / 234	Supermajority

== See also ==
- Timeline of Portuguese history
