= 1874 Portuguese legislative election =

- 12 July 1874

All 107 seats in the Chamber of Deputies 54 seats needed for a majority
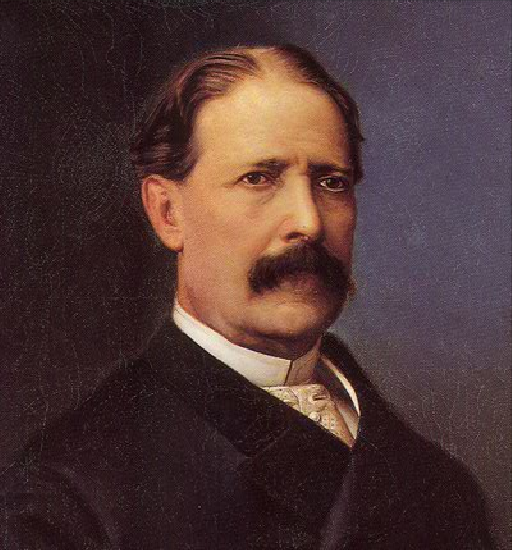

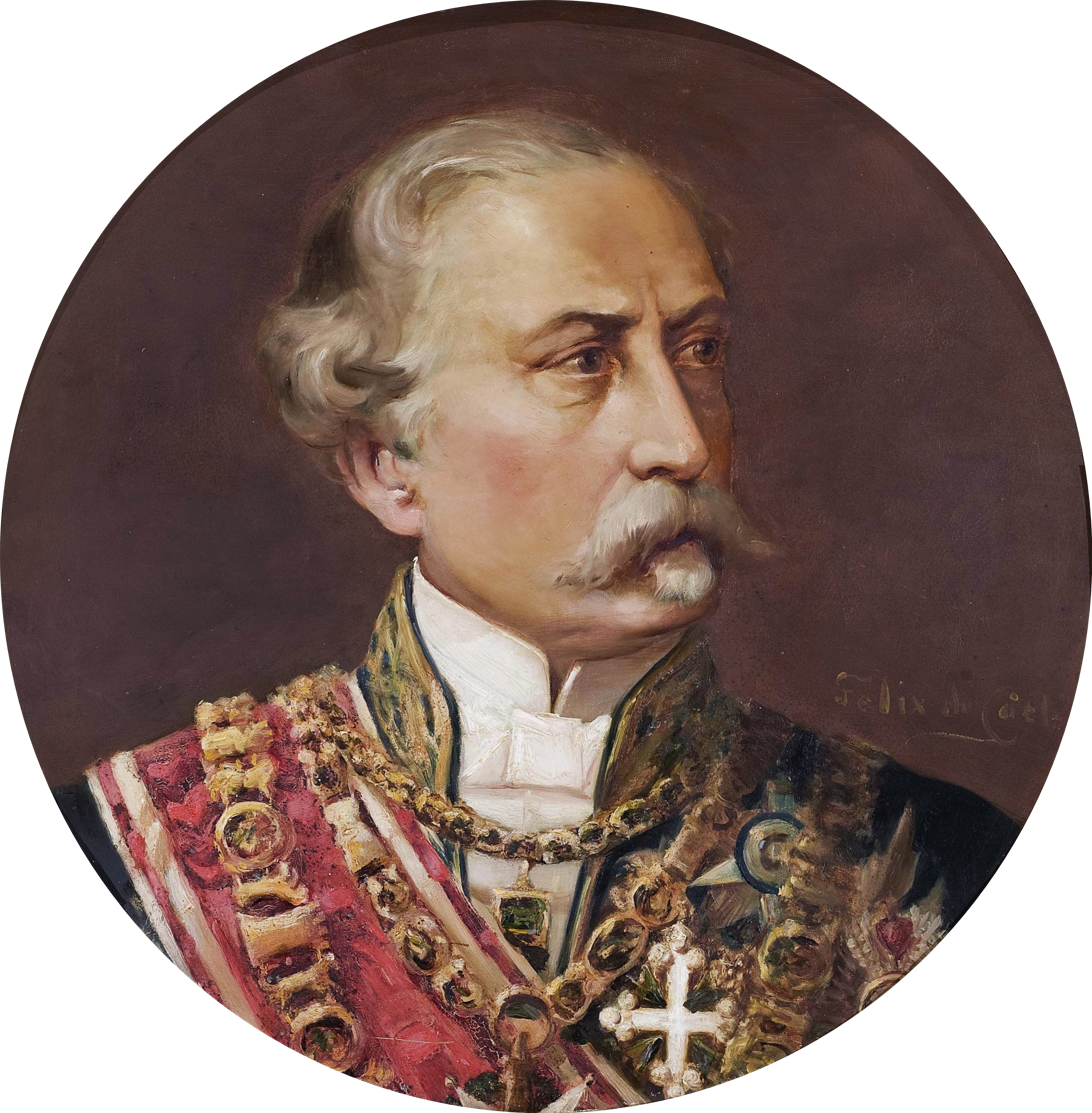

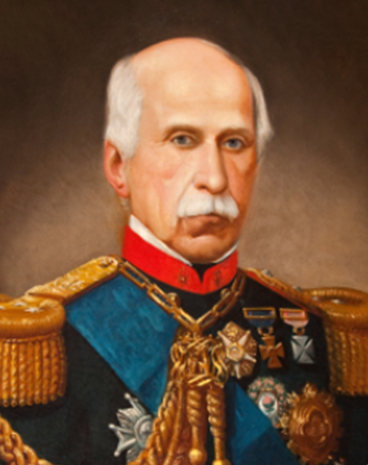

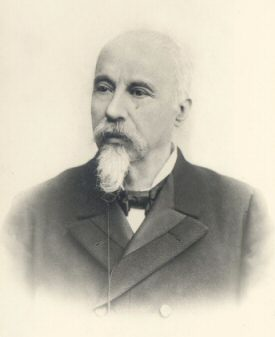
	First party	Second party
Leader	Fontes Pereira de Melo	1st Duke of Loulé
Party	Regenerator	Historic
Last election	49 seats (Note: Including Avilistas)	31 seats
Seats won	78	8
Seats after	▲29	▼23
	Third party	Fourth party
Leader	1st Marquis of Sá da Bandeira	José Dias Ferreira
Party	Reformist	Constituent
Last election	14 seats	8 seats
Seats won	8	6
Seats after	▼6	▼2
Prime Minister before election
Fontes Pereira de Melo
Regenerator
Prime Minister after election
Fontes Pereira de Melo
Regenerator

Parliamentary elections were held in Portugal on 12 July 1874.

== Results ==
Party	Votes	%	Seats	+/–
Regenerator Party and Avilistas			78	+29
Historic Party			8	–23
Reformist Party			8	–6
Constituent Party			6	–2
Overseas seats			7	–
Total			107	0
Total votes	291,402	–		
Registered voters/turnout	452,036	64.46		
Source: ISCSP, Nohlen & Stöver
