= 1871 Portuguese legislative election =

- 9 July 1871

All 107 seats in the Chamber of Deputies 54 seats needed for a majority
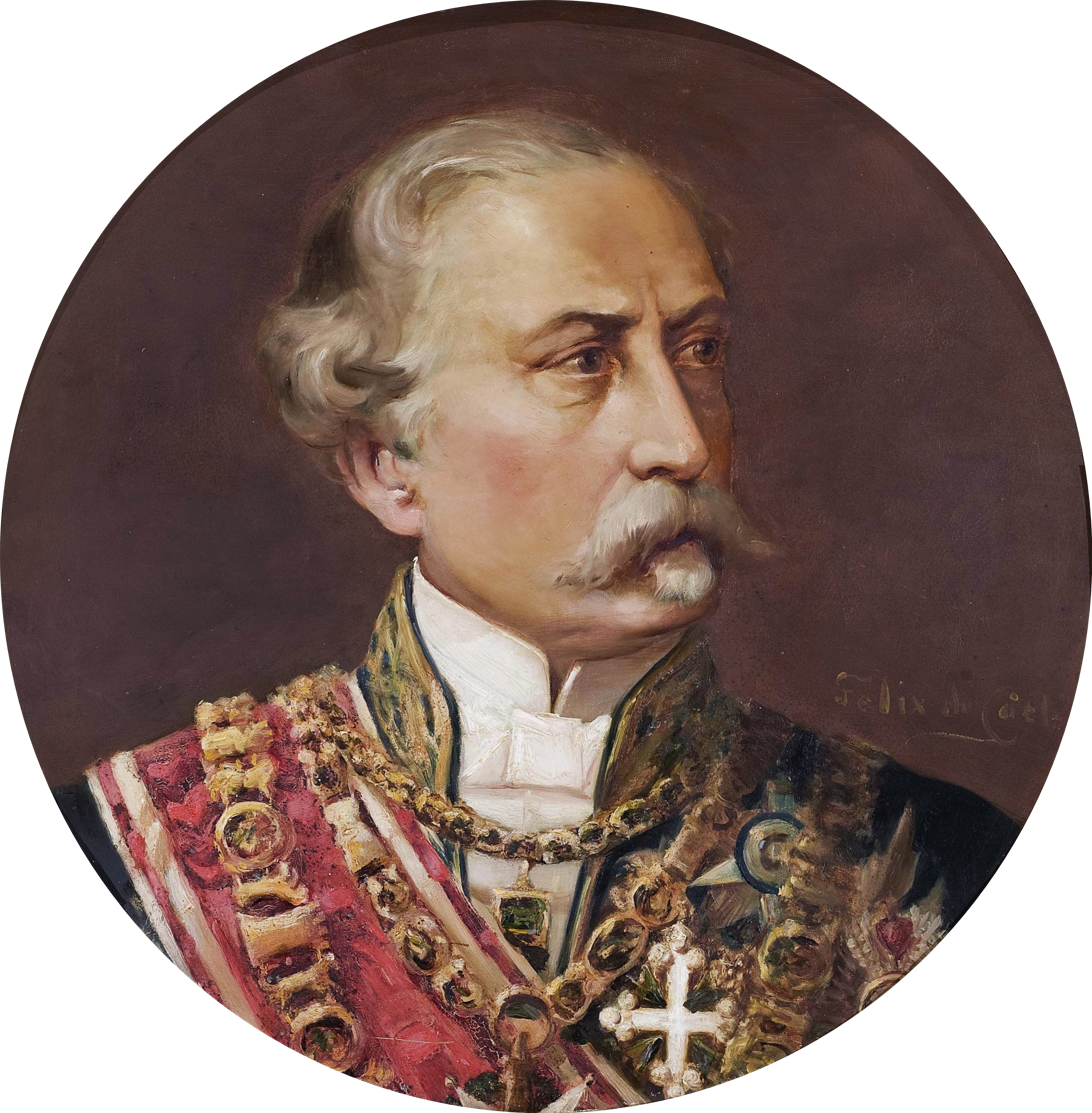

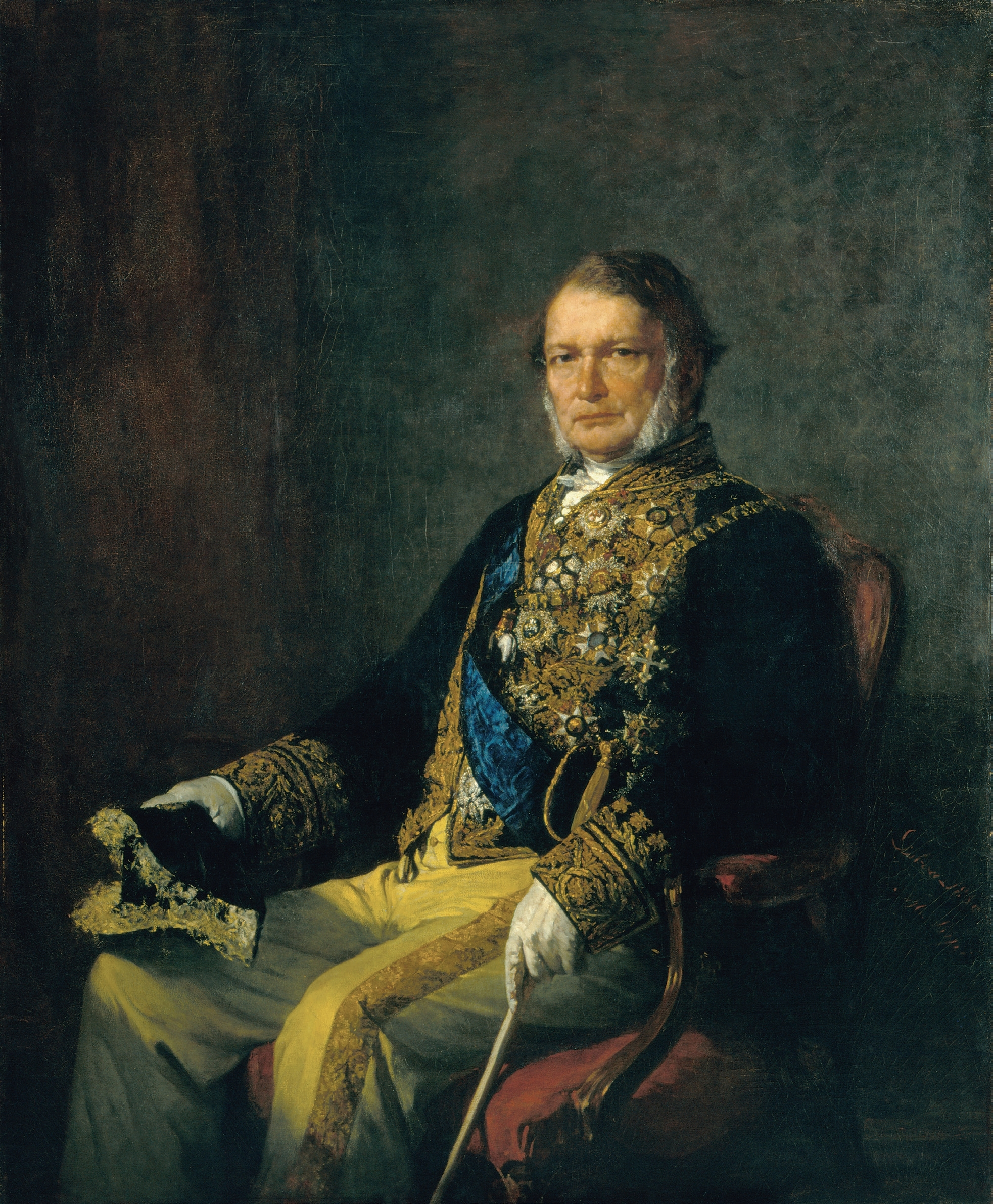

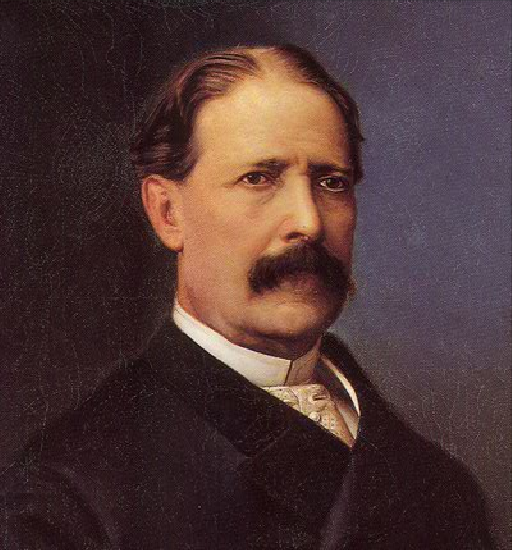

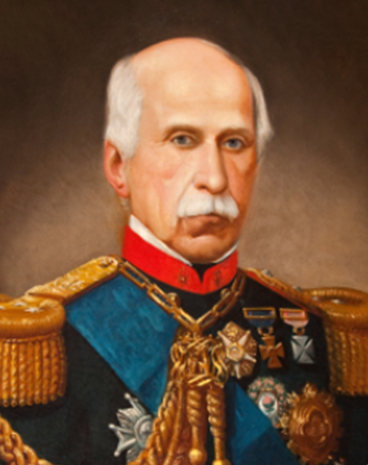

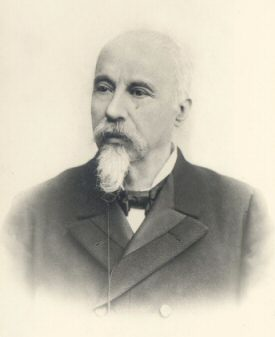
	First party	Second party	Third party
Leader	1st Duke of Loulé	1st Duke of Ávila	Fontes Pereira de Melo
Party	Historic	Avilists	Regenerator
Last election	20 seats	16 seats	12 seats
Seats won	31	27	22
Seats after	▲11	▲11	▲10
	Fourth party	Fifth party
Leader	1st Marquis of Sá da Bandeira	José Dias Ferreira
Party	Reformist	Constituent
Last election	59 seats	–
Seats won	14	8
Seats after	▼45	New
Prime Minister before election
1st Duke of Ávila
Avilista
Prime Minister after election
1st Duke of Ávila
Avilista

Parliamentary elections were held in Portugal on 9 July 1871.

== Results ==
Party	Votes	%	Seats	+/–
Historic Party			31	+11
Avilistas			27	+11
Regenerator Party			22	+10
Reformist Party			14	–45
Constituent Party			8	New
Others			5	–
Total			107	0
Total votes	242,714	–		
Registered voters/turnout	430,289	56.41		
Source: ISCSP, Nohlen & Stöver
