= 1868 Portuguese legislative election =

- 22 March and 12 April 1868

All 177 seats in the Chamber of Deputies 89 seats needed for a majority
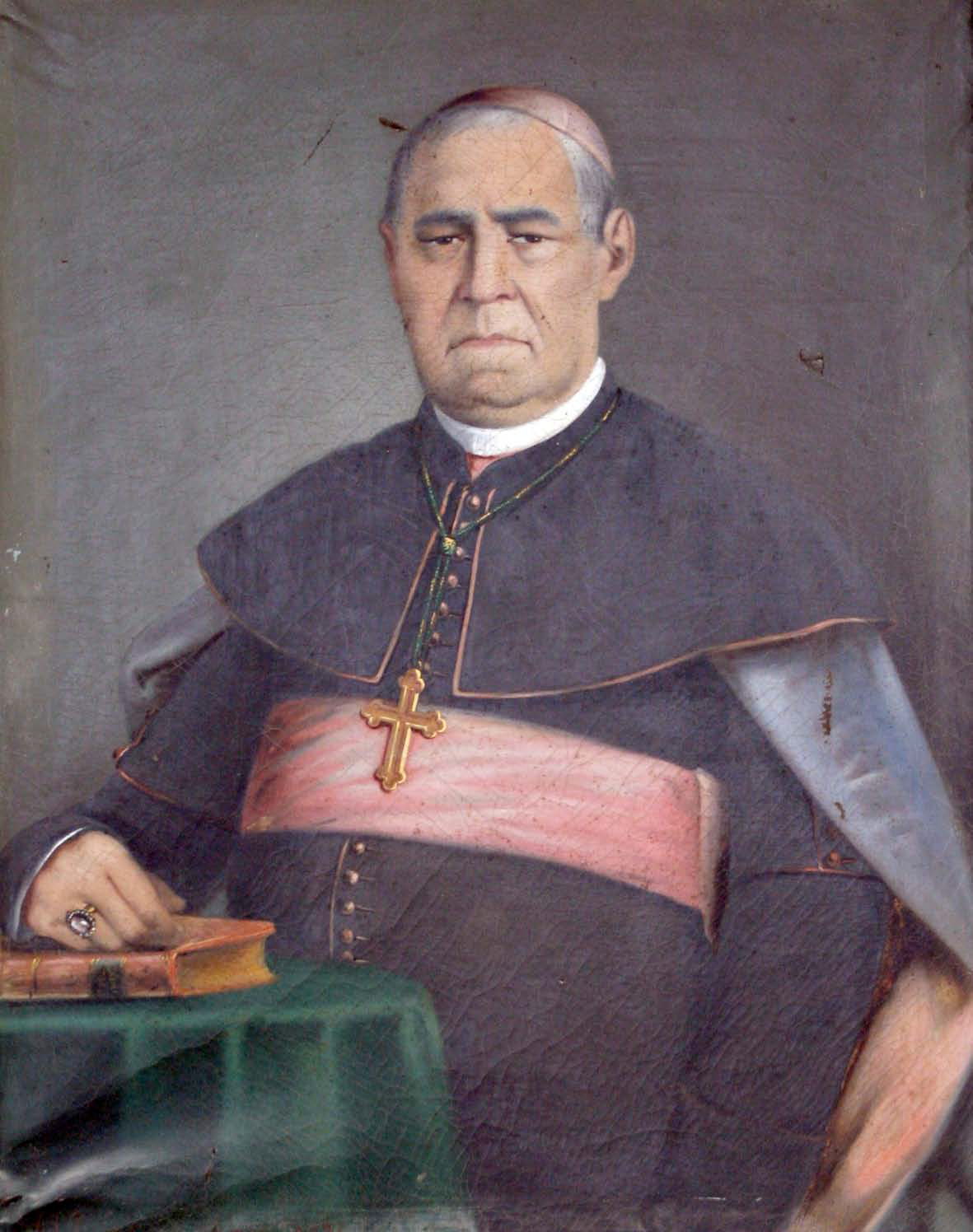

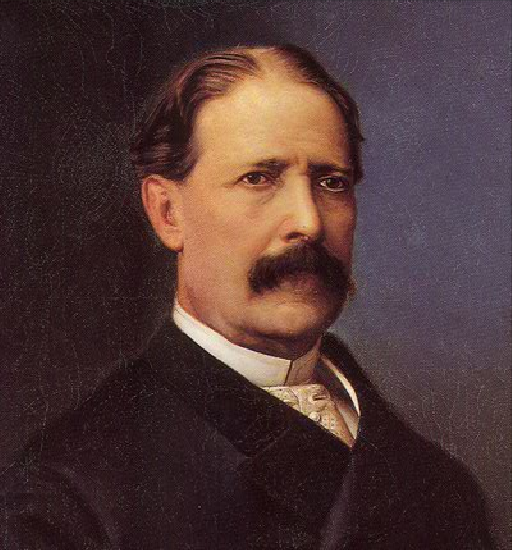

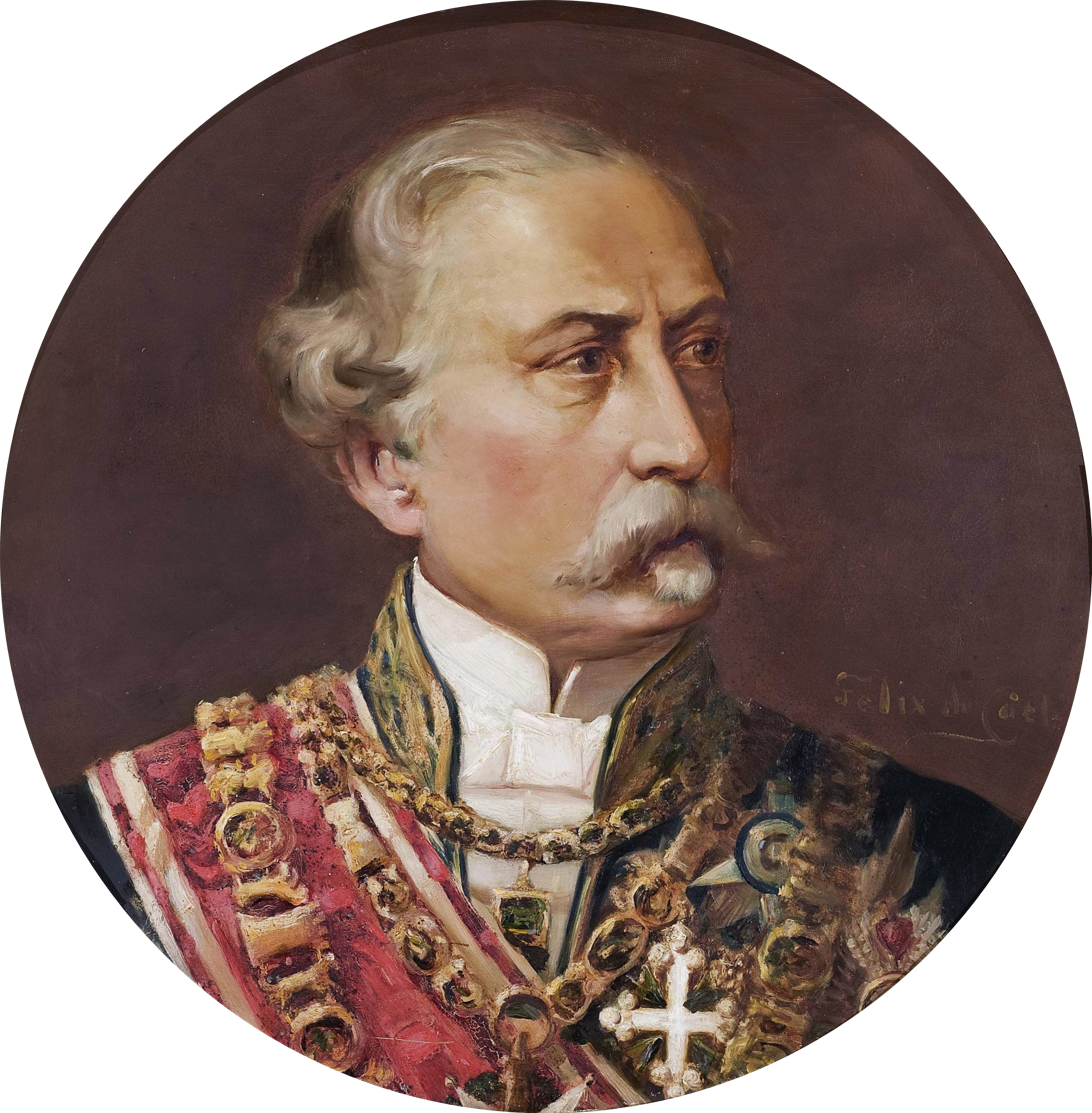
	First party	Second party	Third party
Leader	António Alves Martins	Fontes Pereira de Melo	1st Duke of Loulé
Party	Reformist & Avilista	Regenerator	Historic
Seats won	157	13	9
Prime Minister before election
1st Marquis of Sá da Bandeira
Reformist
Prime Minister after election
1st Marquis of Sá da Bandeira
Reformist

Parliamentary elections were held in Portugal on 22 March and 12 April.

== Results ==
Party	Votes	%	Seats
Reformist Party			157
Avilistas			157
Regenerator Party			13
Historic Party			9
Total			179
Total votes	266,018	–	
Registered voters/turnout	366,448	72.59	
Source: ISCSP, Nohlen & Stöver
