= September 1870 Portuguese legislative election =

- 18 September 1870

All 107 seats in the Chamber of Deputies 54 seats needed for a majority
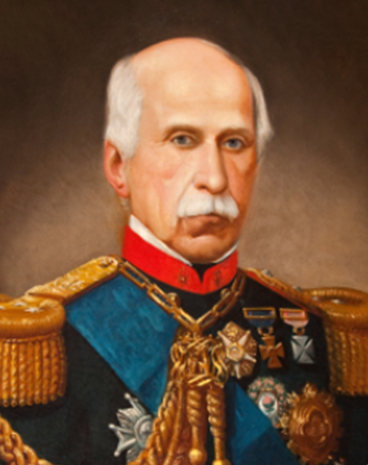

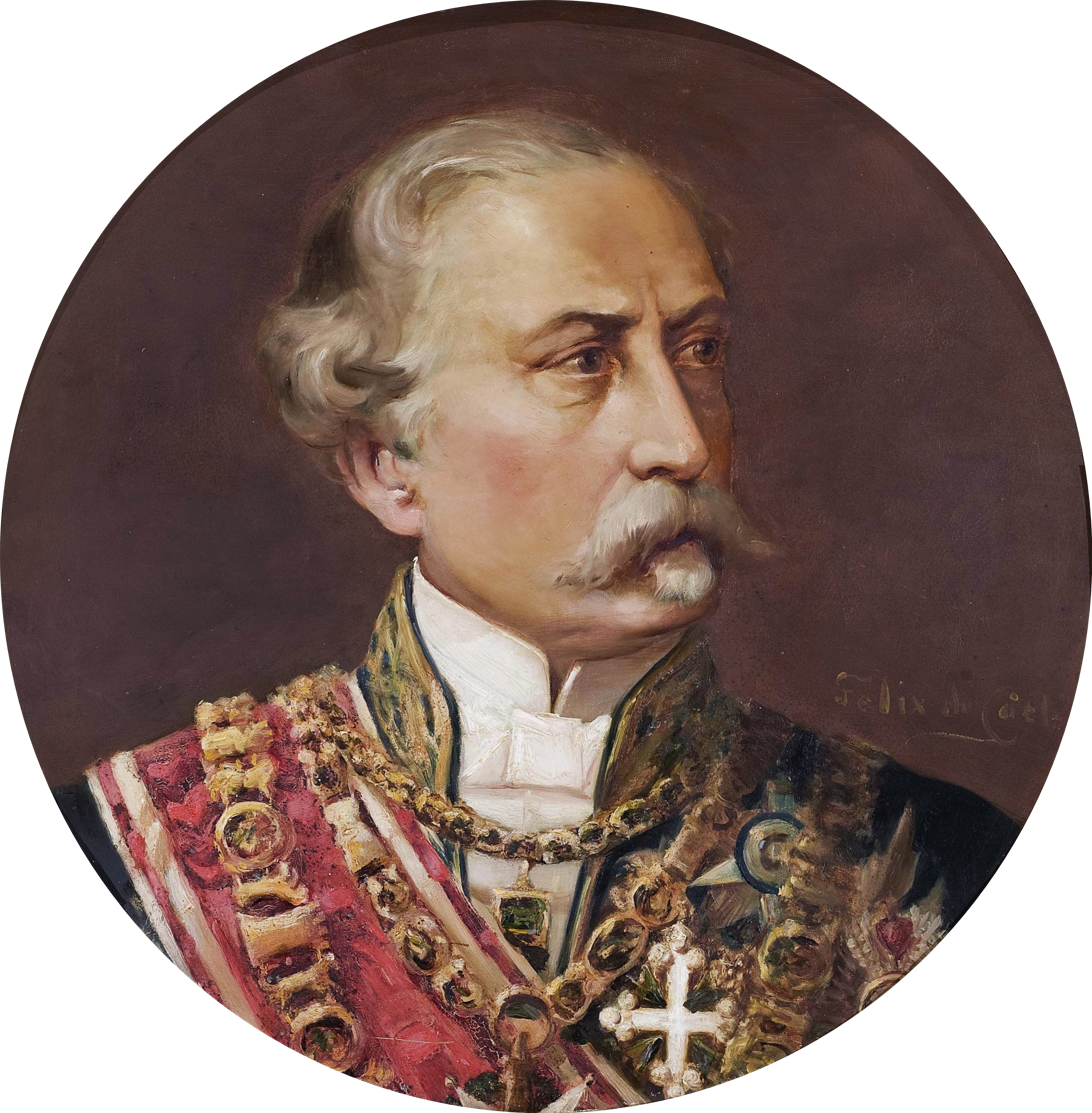

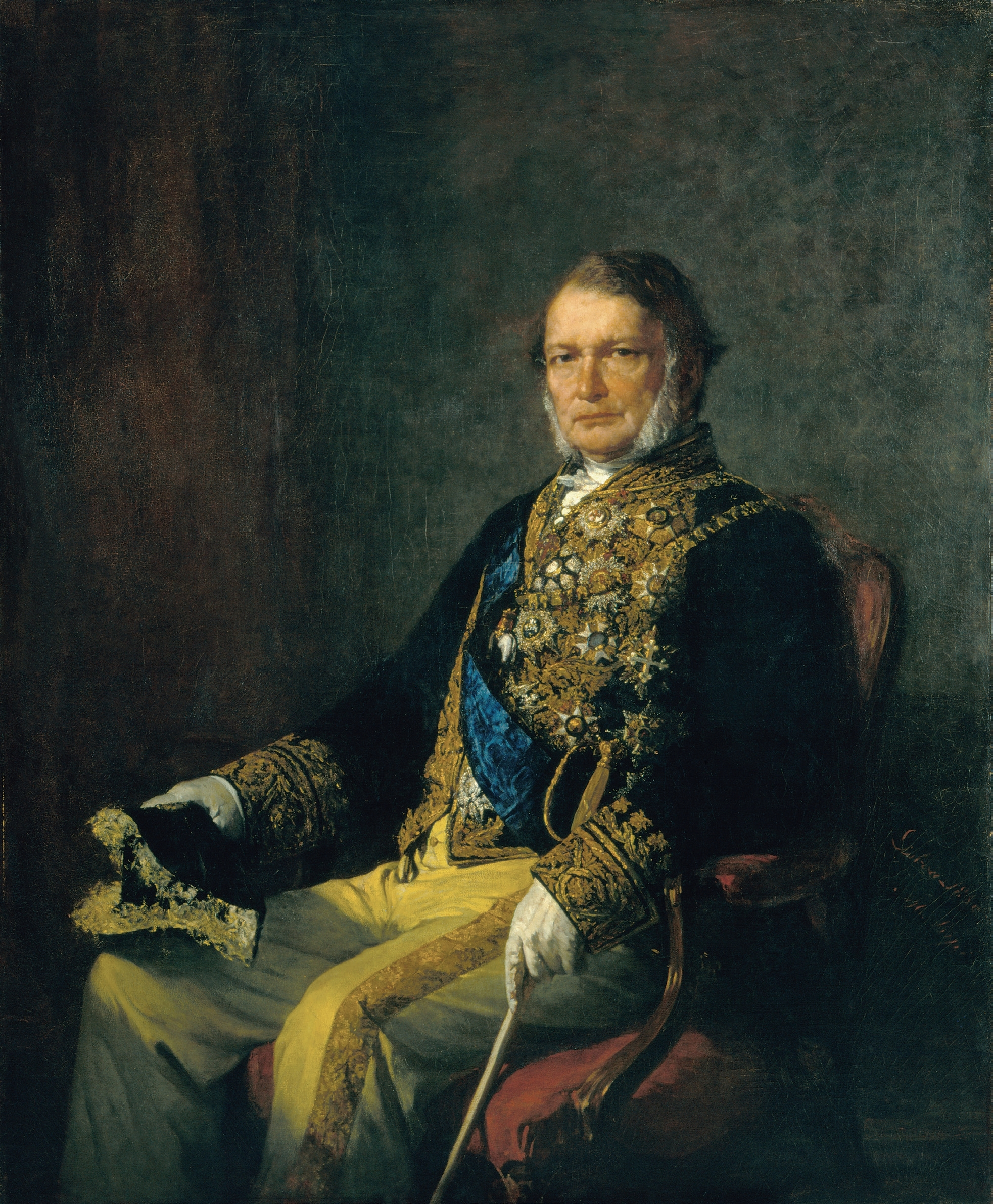

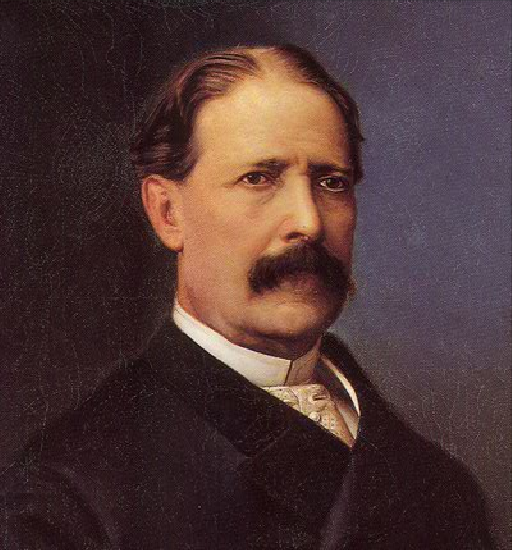
	First party	Second party
Leader	1st Marquis of Sá da Bandeira	1st Duke of Loulé
Party	Reformist	Historic
Last election	15 seats	75 seats
Seats won	59	20
Seats after	▲44	▼55
	Third party	Fourth party
Leader	1st Duke of Ávila	Fontes Pereira de Melo
Party	Avilistas	Regenerator
Last election	–	14 seats
Seats won	16	12
Seats after	New	▼2
Prime Minister before election
1st Marquis of Sá da Bandeira
Reformist
Prime Minister after election
1st Marquis of Sá da Bandeira
Reformist

Parliamentary elections were held in Portugal on 18 September 1870.

== Results ==
Party	Votes	%	Seats	+/–
Reformist Party			59	+44
Historic Party			20	–55
Avilistas			16	New
Regenerator Party			12	–2
Total			107	0
Total votes	230,789	–		
Registered voters/turnout	422,642	54.61		
Source: ISCSP, Nohlen & Stöver
