= 1868 in Portugal =

- Centuries: 17th; 18th; 19th; 20th; 21st
- Decades: 1840s; 1850s; 1860s; 1870s; 1880s
- See also: List of years in Portugal

Events in the year 1868 in Portugal.

== Incumbents ==
- Monarch: Louis I
- Prime Ministers: Joaquim António de Aguiar; António José de Ávila, 1st Duke of Ávila and Bolama; Bernardo de Sá Nogueira de Figueiredo, 1st Marquis of Sá da Bandeira

== Events ==
- 22 March and 12 April - Legislative election.
- Janeirinha (protest movement)

== Births ==
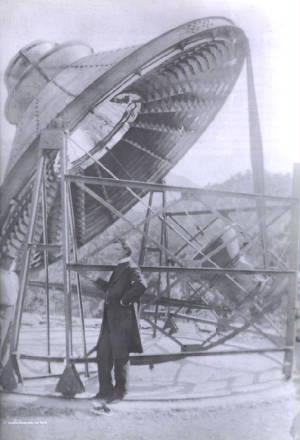
Manuel António Gomes in 1900

- 7 April – José de Castro, lawyer, journalist and politician (died 1929)
- 9 December – Manuel António Gomes, Catholic priest, inventor and physicist, a pioneer of solar energy in Portugal (d. 1933)
