= 1864 Portuguese legislative election =

- 11 September 1864

All 177 seats in the Chamber of Deputies 89 seats needed for a majority
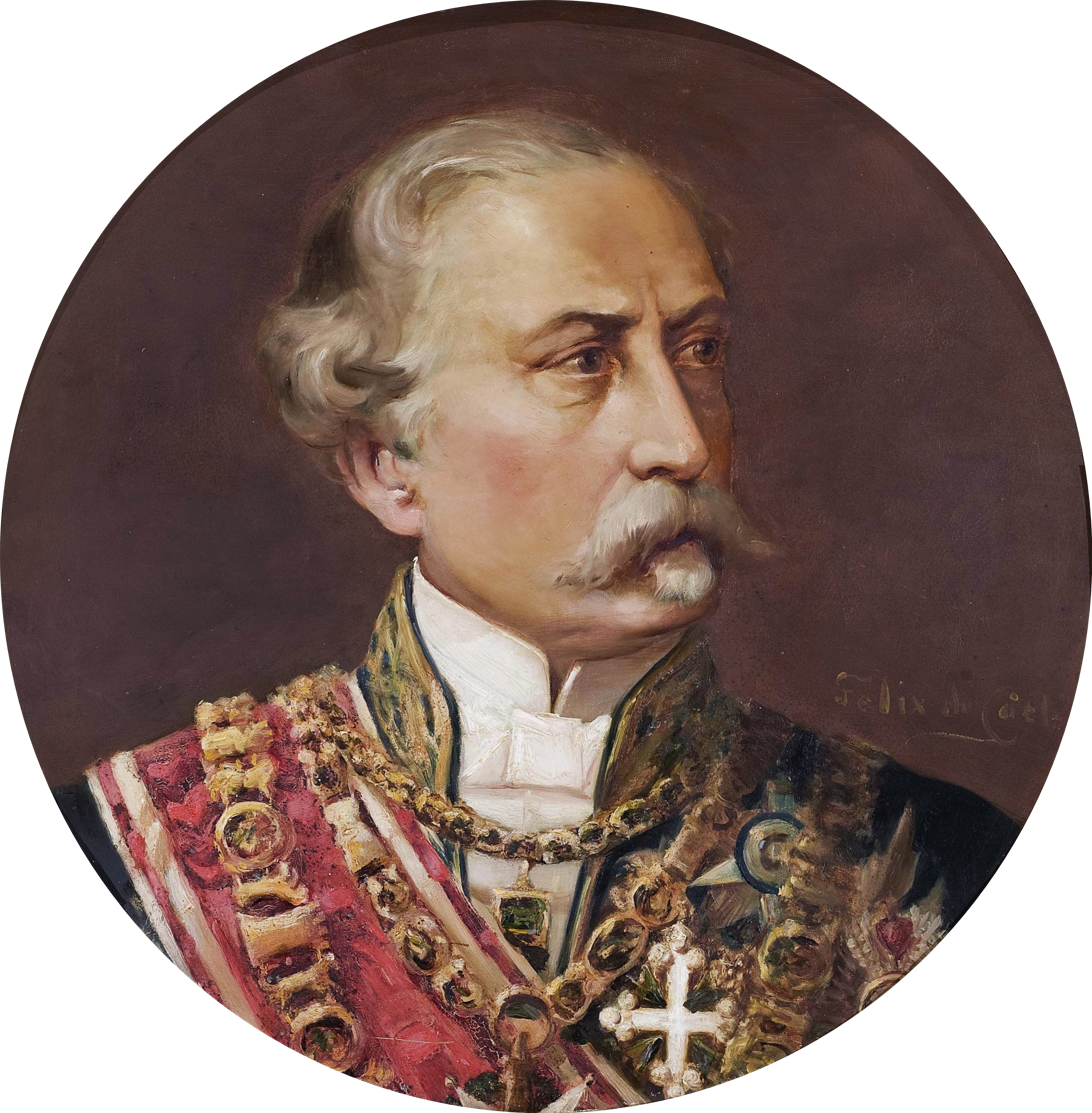

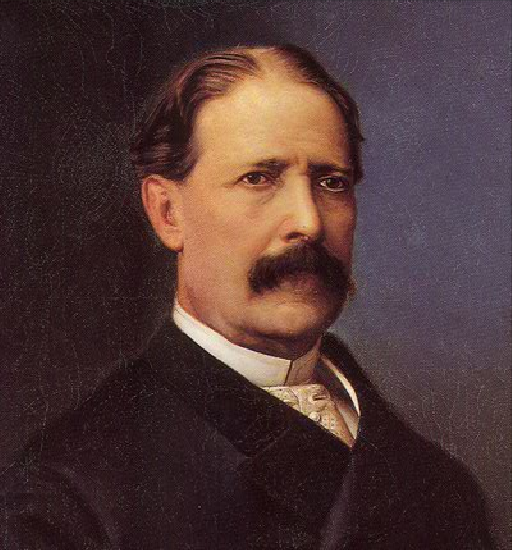
	First party	Second party
Leader	1st Duke of Loulé	Fontes Pereira de Melo
Party	Historic	Regenerator
Last election	137 seats	40 seats
Seats won	145	32
Seats after	▲8	▼8
Prime Minister before election
1st Duke of Loulé
Historic
Prime Minister after election
1st Duke of Loulé
Historic

Parliamentary elections were held in Portugal on 11 September 1864.

== Results ==
Party	Votes	%	Seats	+/–
Historic Party			145	+8
Regenerator Party			32	–8
Total			177	0
Total votes	238,462	–		
Registered voters/turnout	350,145	68.10		
Source: ISCSP, Nohlen & Stöver
