= 1860 Portuguese legislative election =

- 1 January 1860

All 179 seats in the Chamber of Deputies 90 seats needed for a majority
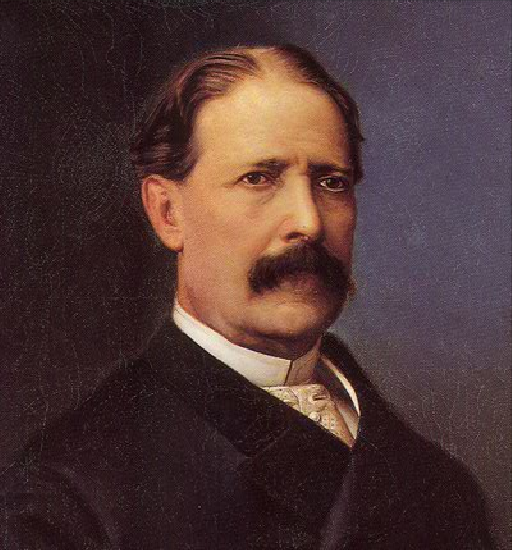

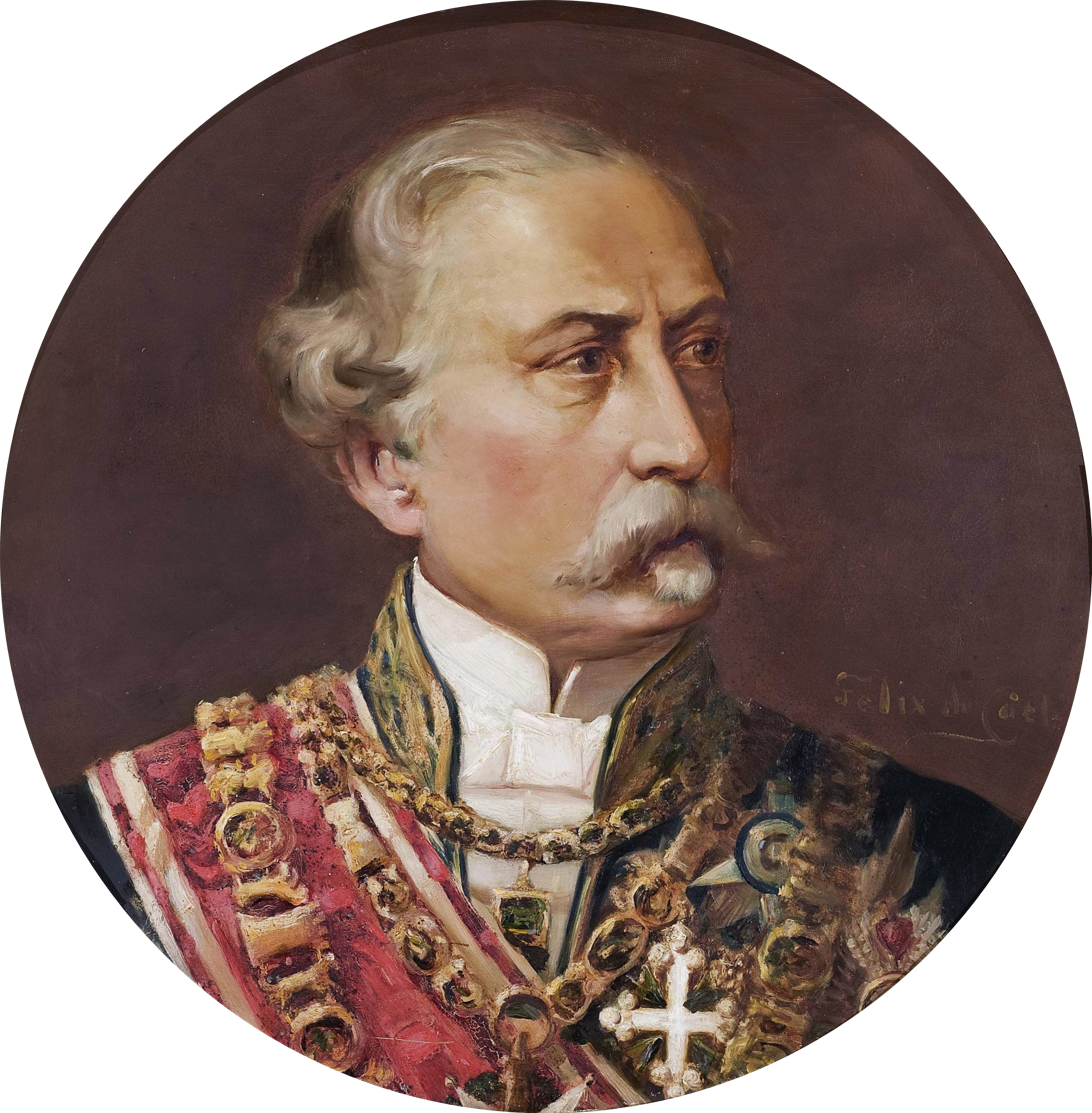

	First party	Second party	Third party
Leader	Fontes Pereira de Melo	1st Duke of Loulé
Party	Regenerator	Historic	Miguelistas
Last election	22 seats	138 seats	2 seats
Seats won	162	15	2
Seats after	▲140	▼123	Steady
Prime Minister before election
1st Duke of Terceira
Regenerator
Prime Minister after election
1st Duke of Terceira
Regenerator

Legislative elections were held in Portugal on 1 January 1860.

== Results ==
Party	Votes	%	Seats	+/–
Regenerator Party and Cabralistas			162	+140
Historic Party			15	–123
Miguelistas			2	0
Total			179	+17
Registered voters/turnout	310,494	–		
Source: ISCSP, Tavares de Almeida
