= March 1870 Portuguese legislative election =

- 13 March 1870

All 107 seats in the Chamber of Deputies 54 seats needed for a majority
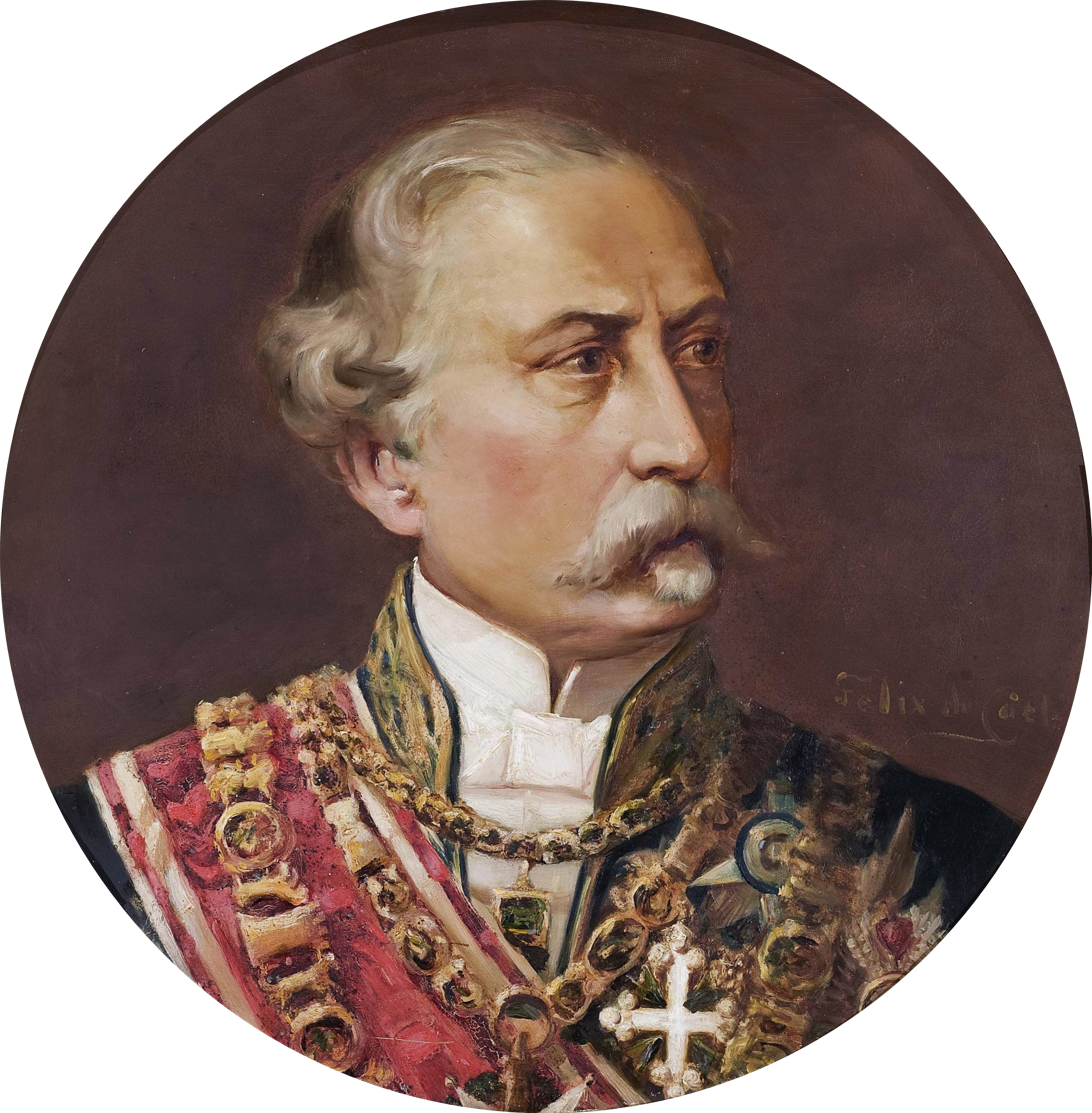

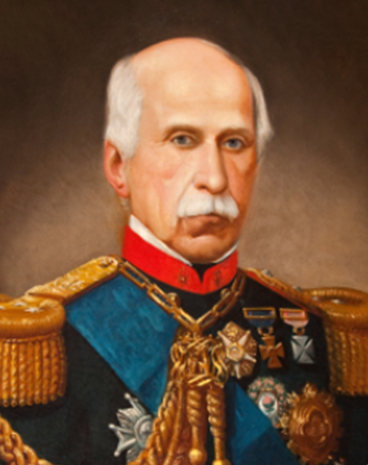

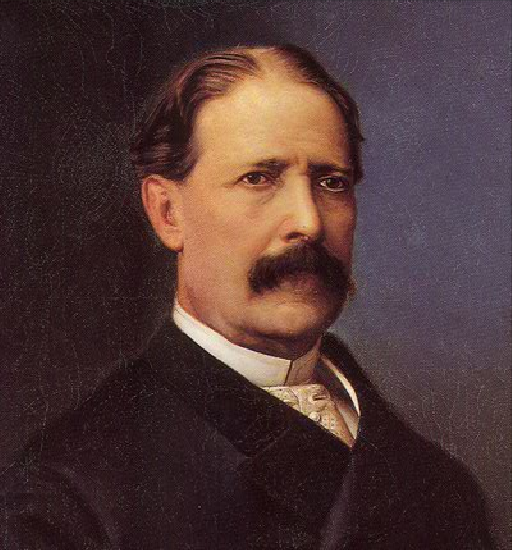
	First party	Second party	Third party
Leader	1st Duke of Loulé	1st Marquis of Sá da Bandeira	Fontes Pereira de Melo
Party	Historic	Reformist	Regenerator
Last election	20 seats	79 seats	5 seats
Seats won	75	15	14
Seats after	▲55	▼64	▲9
Prime Minister before election
1st Duke of Loulé
Historic
Prime Minister after election
1st Duke of Loulé
Historic

Parliamentary elections were held in Portugal on 13 March 1870.

== Results ==
Party	Votes	%	Seats	+/–
Historic Party			75	+55
Reformist Party			15	–64
Regenerator Party			14	+9
Independents			3	–
Total			107	0
Total votes	227,298	–		
Registered voters/turnout	366,886	61.95		
Source: ISCSP, Nohlen & Stöver
