= 1861 Portuguese legislative election =

- 22 April 1861

All 177 seats in the Chamber of Deputies 89 seats needed for a majority
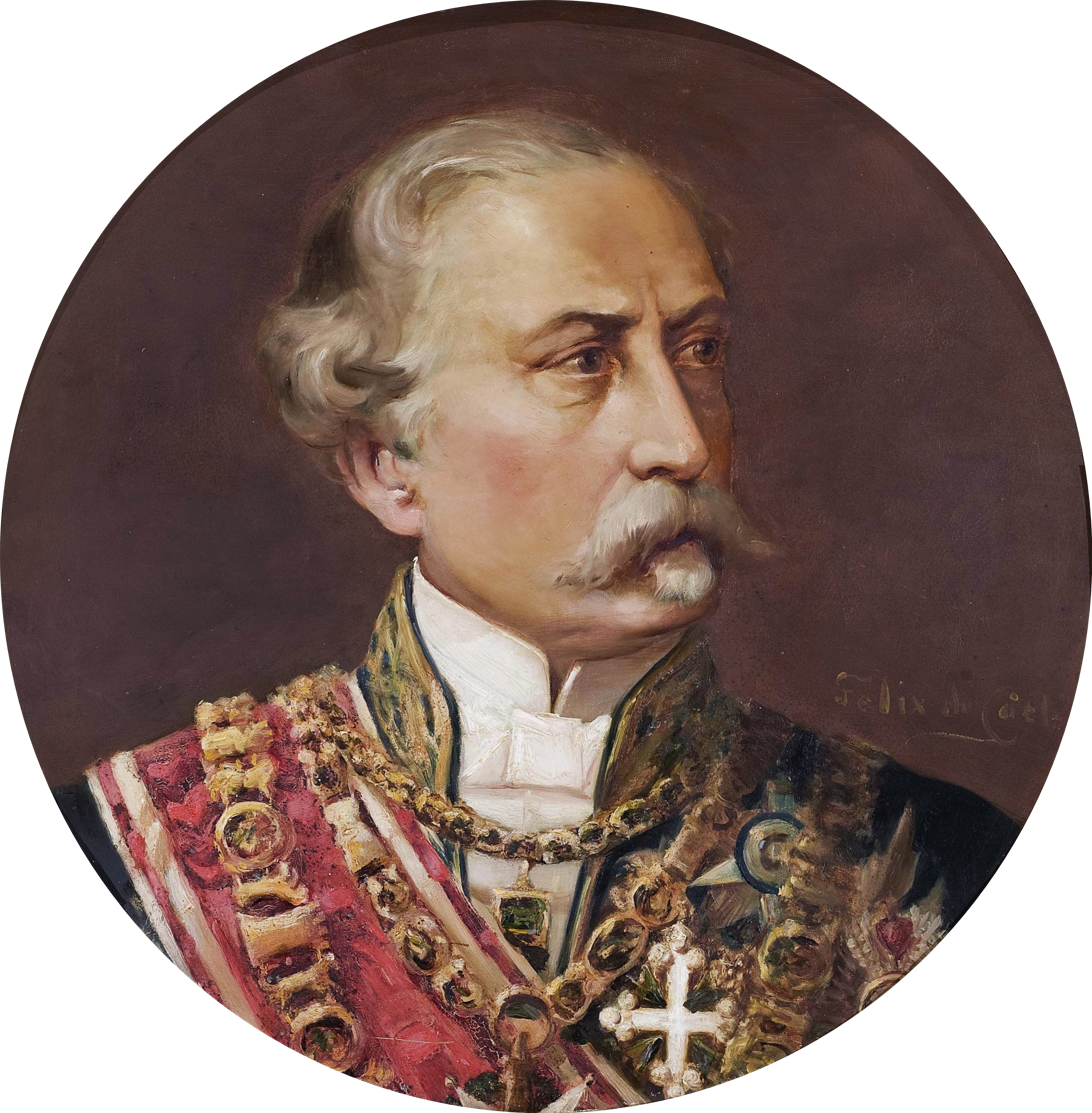

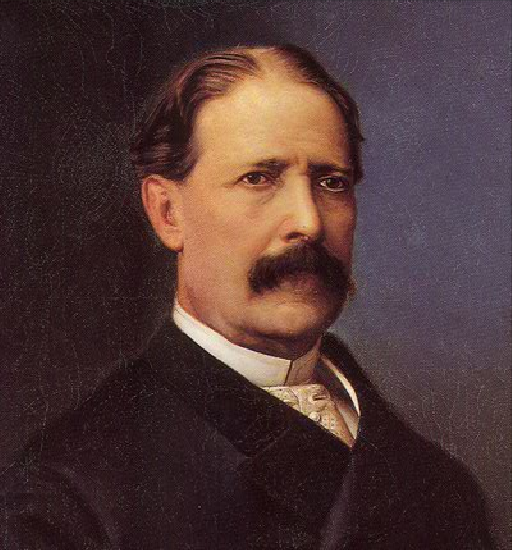
	First party	Second party
Leader	1st Duke of Loulé	Fontes Pereira de Melo
Party	Historic	Regenerator
Last election	15 seats	162 seats
Seats won	137	40
Seats after	▲122	▼122
Prime Minister before election
1st Duke of Loulé
Historic
Prime Minister after election
1st Duke of Loulé
Historic

Parliamentary elections were held in Portugal on 22 April 1861.

== Results ==
Party	Votes	%	Seats	+/–
Historic Party			137	+122
Regenerator Party			40	–122
Total			177	–2
Total votes	194,818	–		
Registered voters/turnout	302,169	64.47		
Source: ISCSP, Nohlen & Stöver
