= 1870 in Portugal =

- Centuries: 17th; 18th; 19th; 20th; 21st
- Decades: 1850s; 1860s; 1870s; 1880s; 1890s
- See also: List of years in Portugal

Events in the year 1870 in Portugal.

== Incumbents ==
- Monarch: Louis I
- Prime Ministers: Four different

== Events ==
- 13 March - Legislative election.
- 19 May – João Carlos Saldanha de Oliveira Daun, 1st Duke of Saldanha takes over as Prime Minister
- 29 August – Bernardo de Sá Nogueira de Figueiredo, 1st Marquis of Sá da Bandeira takes over as Prime Minister
- 18 September - Legislative election
- 29 October – António José de Ávila, 1st Duke of Ávila and Bolama takes over as Prime Minister

== Births ==
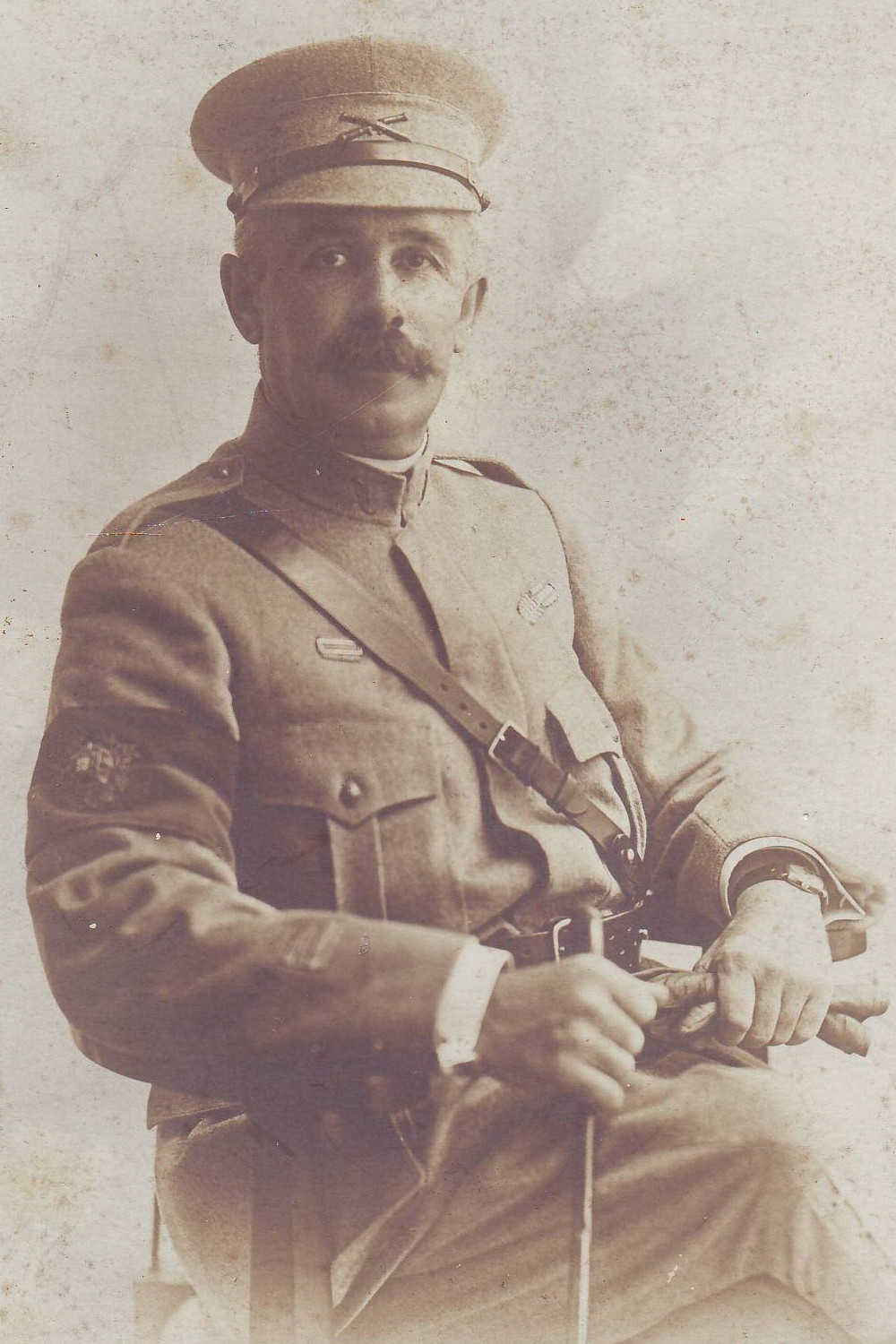
Artur Ivens Ferraz in 1923

- 1 December – Artur Ivens Ferraz, military officer and politician (died 1933)
