= 1858 Portuguese legislative election =

- 2 May 1858

All 162 seats in the Chamber of Deputies 82 seats needed for a majority
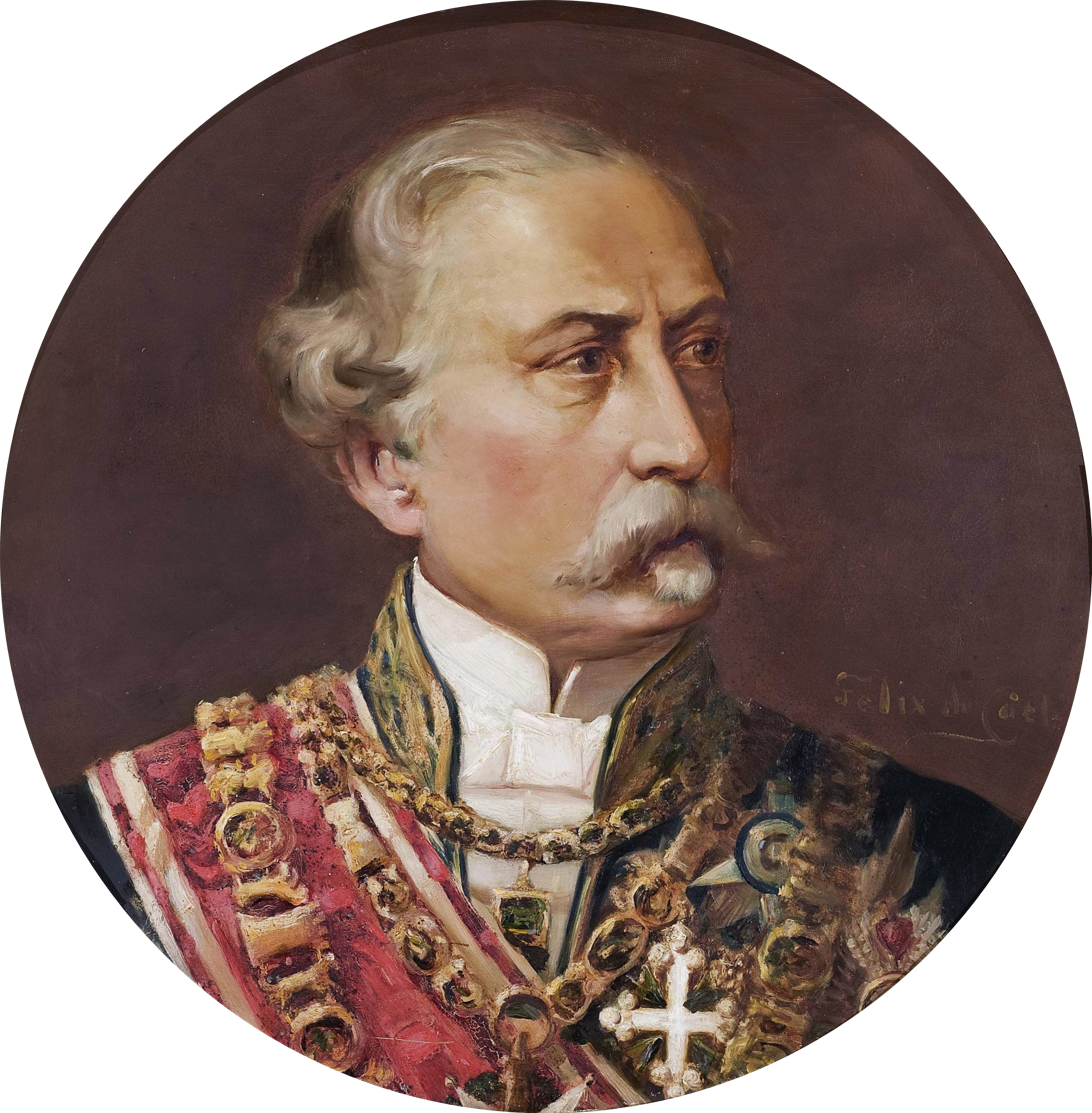

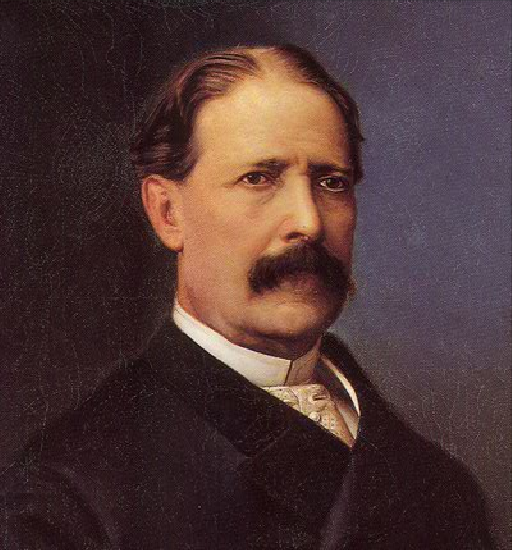

	First party	Second party	Third party
Leader	1st Duke of Loulé	Fontes Pereira de Melo
Party	Historic	Regenerator	Miguelistas
Last election	116 seats	41 seats	5 seats
Seats won	138	22	2
Seats after	▲22	▼19	▼3
Prime Minister before election
1st Duke of Loulé
Historic
Prime Minister after election
1st Duke of Loulé
Historic

Legislative elections were held in Portugal on 2 May 1858.

== Results ==
Party	Seats	+/–
Historic Party	138	+22
Regenerator Party	22	–19
Miguelistas	2	–3
Total	162	0
Source: ISCSP
