= Partido Progressista =

Partido Progressista may refer to:

- Progressistas, in Brazil
- Progressive Party (Portugal)
