= 1890 Portuguese legislative election =

- 30 March 1890

All seats in the Chamber of Deputies
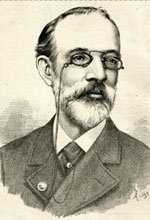

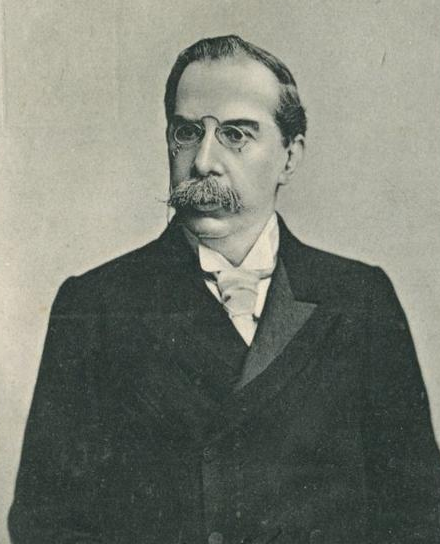
	First party	Second party	Third party
			Rep
Leader	António de Serpa Pimentel	José Luciano de Castro	Political Directory
Party	Regenerator	Progressive	Republican
Seats won	115	33	4
Prime Minister before election
António de Serpa Pimentel
Regenerator
Prime Minister after election
António de Serpa Pimentel
Regenerator

Parliamentary elections were held in Portugal on 30 March 1890. The result was a victory for the Regenerator Party, which won 115 seats.

== Results ==
Party	Votes	%	Seats
Regenerator Party			115
Progressive Party			33
Portuguese Republican Party			4
Total			152
Registered voters/turnout	951,490	–	
Source: Nohlen & Stöver

The results exclude the six seats won at national level and those from overseas territories.
