= 1871 in Portugal =

- Centuries: 17th; 18th; 19th; 20th; 21st
- Decades: 1850s; 1860s; 1870s; 1880s; 1890s
- See also: List of years in Portugal

Events in the year 1871 in Portugal.

== Incumbents ==
- Monarch: Louis I
- Prime Minister: António José de Ávila, 1st Duke of Ávila and Bolama (until 13 September); Fontes Pereira de Melo

== Events ==
9 July – Portuguese legislative election, 1871.

== Births ==
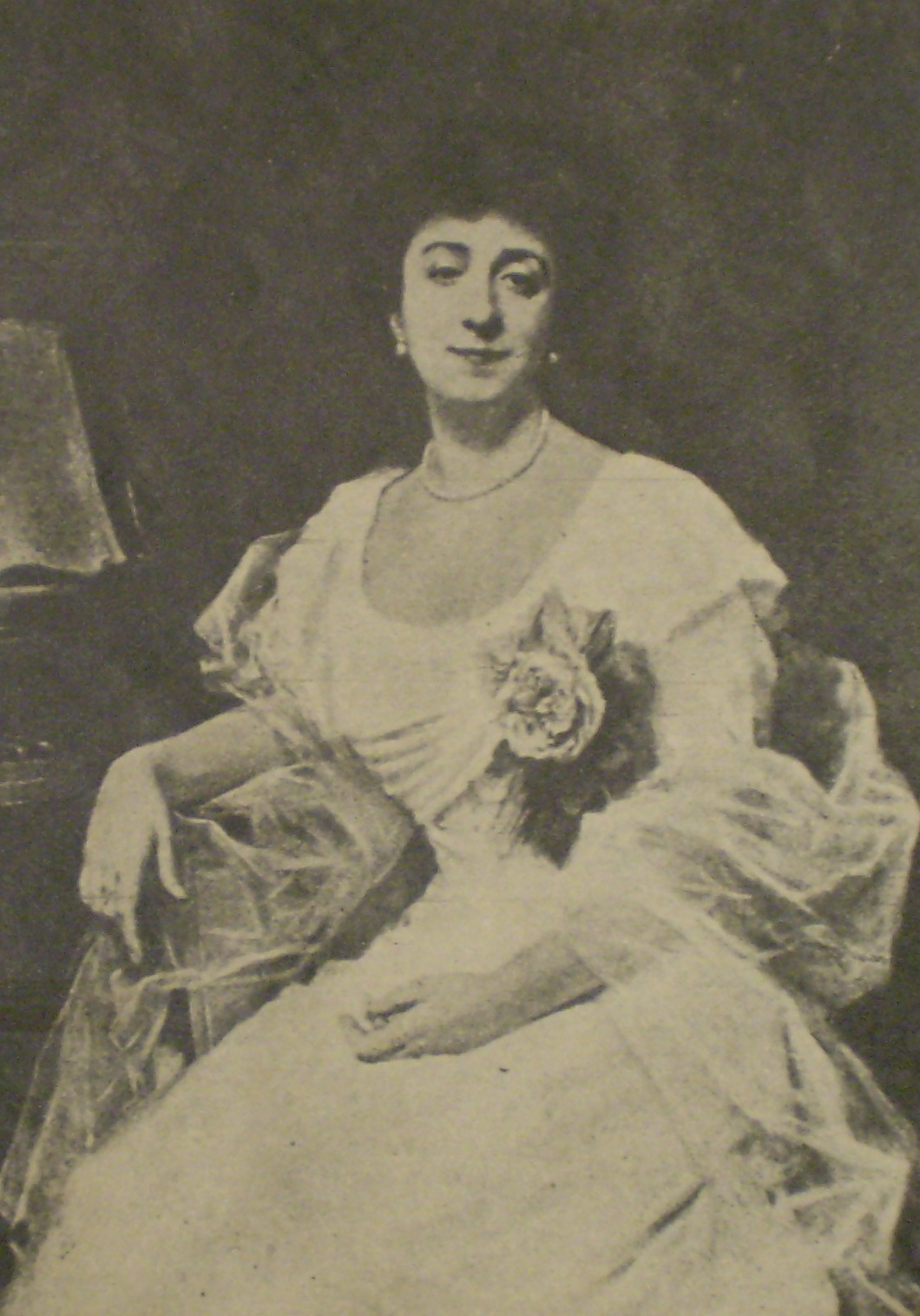
Regina Pacini

- Regina Pacini, lyric soprano (died 1965)
- José Ramos Preto, politician (died 1949)
