= 1894 Portuguese legislative election =

- 15 April 1894

All seats in the Chamber of Deputies
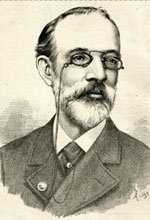

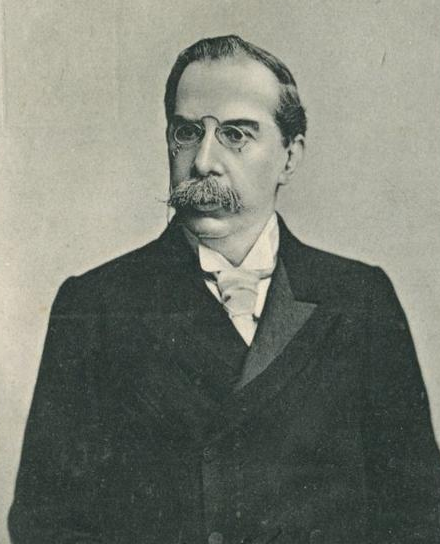
	First party	Second party	Third party
			Rep
Leader	António de Serpa Pimentel	José Luciano de Castro	Political Directory
Party	Regenerator	Progressive	Republican
Seats won	101	33	2
Prime Minister before election
Ernesto Hintze Ribeiro
Regenerator
Prime Minister after election
Ernesto Hintze Ribeiro
Regenerator

Parliamentary elections were held in Portugal on 15 April 1894. The result was a victory for the Regenerator Party, which won 101 seats.

== Results ==
Party	Votes	%	Seats
Regenerator Party			101
Progressive Party			33
Portuguese Republican Party			2
Other parties and independents			16
Total			152
Registered voters/turnout	986,233	–	
Source: Nohlen & Stöver

The results exclude the six seats won at national level and those from overseas territories.
