= 1910 Portuguese legislative election =

- 28 August 1910

All 155 seats in the Chamber of Deputies 78 seats needed for a majority
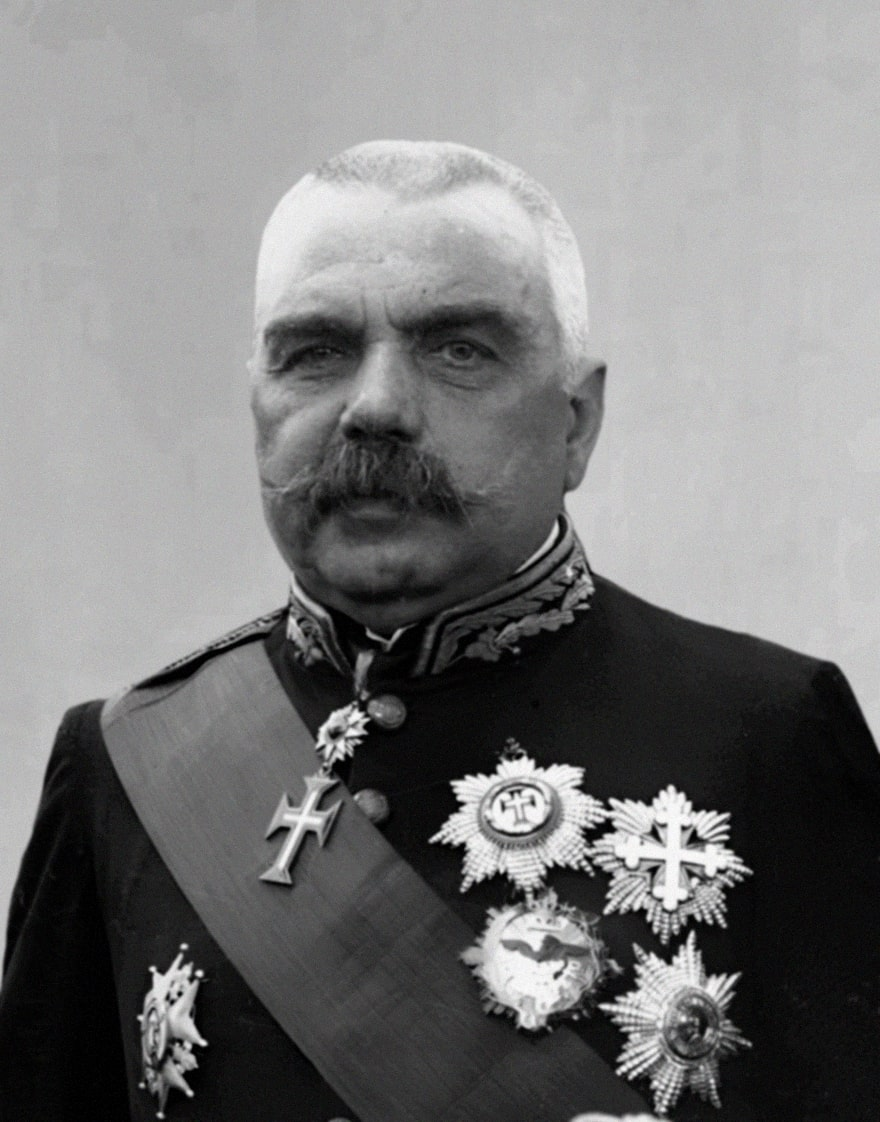

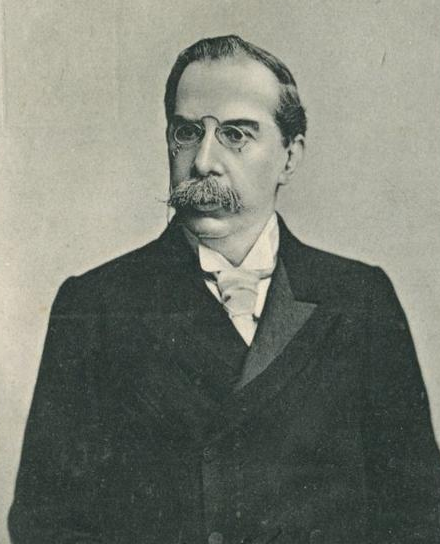

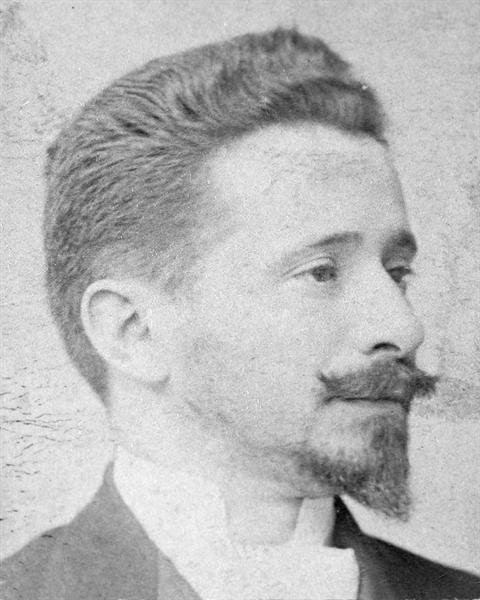
	First party	Second party	Third party
Leader	António Teixeira de Sousa (Regenerator)	José Luciano de Castro (Progressive)	Afonso Costa
Party	Liberal Bloc	Conservative Bloc	Republican
Seats won	90	51	14
Prime Minister before election
António Teixeira de Sousa
Regenerator
Prime Minister after election
Teófilo Braga
(Head of the provisional government)
Republican

Parliamentary elections were held in Portugal on 28 August 1910. However, before the results were confirmed, a coup d'état overthrew the monarchy on 5 October. A Constituent Assembly was elected the following year.

== Results ==
Party or alliance		Votes	%	Seats
Liberal Bloc	Liberal Bloc			52
Liberal Bloc	Regenerator Party (Liberal)			30
Liberal Bloc	Progressive Dissidence			8
Liberal Bloc	Total			90
Conservative Bloc	Progressive Party			23
Conservative Bloc	Regenerator Party (Conservative)			20
Conservative Bloc	Liberal Regenerator Party			5
Conservative Bloc	Nationalist Party			3
Conservative Bloc	Total			51
Portuguese Republican Party				14
Total				155
Registered voters/turnout		695,471	–	
Source: Maltez
