= 1881 Portuguese legislative election =

- 21 August 1881

All seats in the Chamber of Deputies
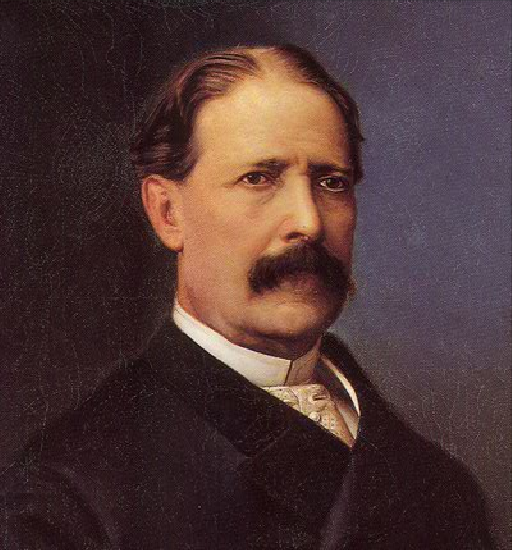

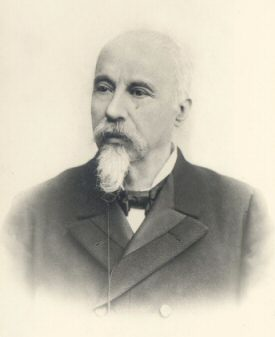

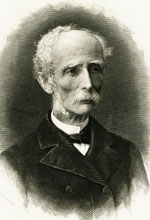
	First party	Second party
Leader	Fontes Pereira de Melo	José Dias Ferreira
Party	Regenerator	Constituent
Leader's seat	Alcobaça	Aveiro
Seats won	122	8
	Third party	Fourth party
		Rep
Leader	Anselmo José Braamcamp	Political Directory
Party	Progressive	Republican
Leader's seat	Not standing
Seats won	6	1
Prime Minister before election
António Rodrigues Sampaio
Regenerator
Prime Minister after election
António Rodrigues Sampaio
Regenerator

Parliamentary elections were held in Portugal on 21 August 1881. The result was a landslide victory for the Regenerator Party, which won 122 seats.

== Results ==
Party	Votes	%	Seats
Regenerator Party			122
Constituent Party			8
Progressive Party			6
Portuguese Republican Party			1
Total			137
Total votes	491,766	–	
Registered voters/turnout	841,511	58.44	
Source: Nohlen & Stöver

The results exclude seats from overseas territories.
