= 1878 Portuguese legislative election =

- 13 October 1878

All seats in the Chamber of Deputies
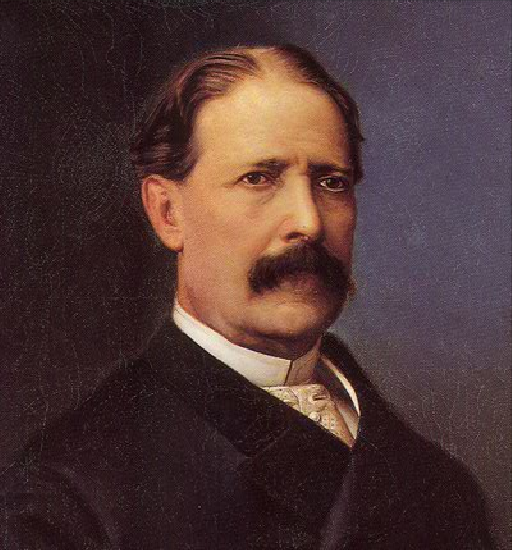

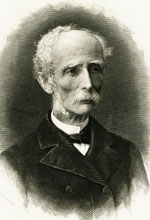

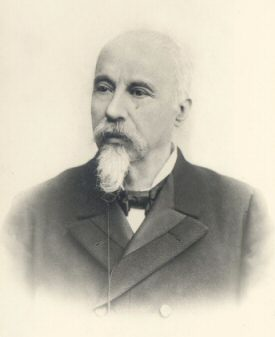
	First party	Second party
Leader	Fontes Pereira de Melo	Anselmo José Braamcamp
Party	Regenerator	Progressive
Seats won	97	22
	Third party	Fourth party
		Rep
Leader	José Dias Ferreira	Political Directory
Party	Constituent	Republican
Seats won	14	1
Prime Minister before election
Fontes Pereira de Melo
Regenerator
Prime Minister after election
Fontes Pereira de Melo
Regenerator

Parliamentary elections were held in Portugal on 13 October 1878. The result was a victory for the Regenerator Party, which won 97 seats.

== Results ==
Party	Votes	%	Seats
Regenerator Party			97
Progressive Party			22
Constituent Party			14
Portuguese Republican Party			1
Other parties and independents			3
Total			137
Total votes	523,929	–	
Registered voters/turnout	824,726	63.53	
Source: Nohlen & Stöver

The results exclude the seats from overseas territories.
