= 1895 Portuguese legislative election =

- 17 November 1895

All seats in the Chamber of Deputies
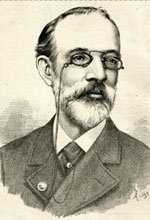
| | First party |
|---|---|
| Leader | António de Serpa Pimentel |
| Party | Regenerator and independents |
| Seats won | 114 |
Prime Minister before election
Ernesto Hintze Ribeiro
Regenerator
Prime Minister after election
Ernesto Hintze Ribeiro
Regenerator

Parliamentary elections were held in Portugal on 17 November 1895. They were boycotted by the Progressive Party and the Portuguese Republican Party, resulting in the Regenerator Party and a small number of independents winning all the seats.

== Results ==
| Party | Votes | % | Seats |
|---|---|---|---|
| Regenerator Party | | | 114 |
| Independents | | | 114 |
| Total | | | 114 |
| Registered voters/turnout | 493,869 | – | |
Source: Nohlen & Stöver

The results exclude the six seats won at national level and those from overseas territories.
