= 1851 Portuguese legislative election =

- 2 and 16 November 1851

All 159 seats in the Chamber of Deputies 80 seats needed for a majority
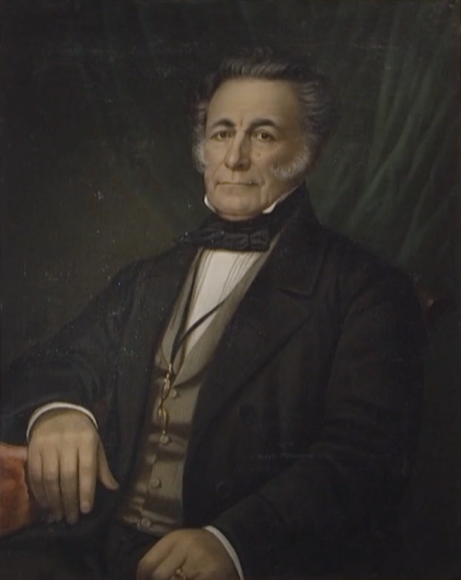

| | First party | Second party |
|---|---|---|
| Leader | Rodrigo da Fonseca Magalhães |
| Party | Regenerator | Cartista |
| Seats won | 125 | 34 |
Prime Minister before election
1st Duke of Saldanha
Regenerator
Prime Minister after election
1st Duke of Saldanha
Regenerator

Legislative elections were held in Portugal on 2 and 16 November 1851.

== Results ==
| Party | Seats |
|---|---|
| Regenerator Party | 125 |
| Cartistas | 34 |
| Total | 159 |
Source: ISCSP
