= 1884 Portuguese legislative election =

- 29 June 1884

All seats in the Chamber of Deputies
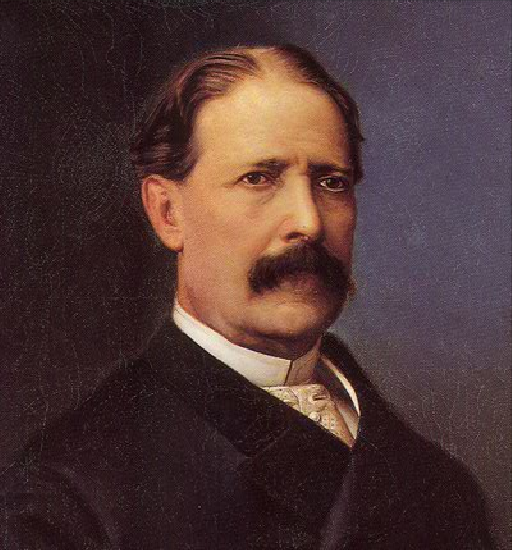

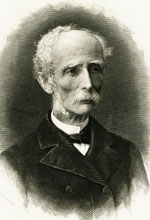

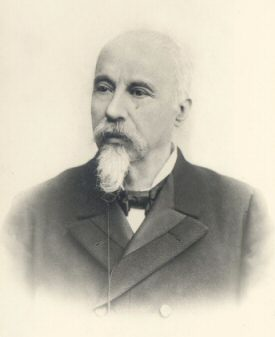
	First party	Second party
Leader	Fontes Pereira de Melo	Anselmo José Braamcamp
Party	Regenerator	Progressive
Seats won	110	31
	Third party	Fourth party
		Rep
Leader	José Dias Ferreira	Political Directory
Party	Constituent	Republican
Seats won	8	2
Prime Minister before election
Fontes Pereira de Melo
Regenerator
Prime Minister after election
Fontes Pereira de Melo
Regenerator

Parliamentary elections were held in Portugal on 29 June 1884. The result was a victory for the Regenerator Party, which won 110 seats.

== Results ==
Party	Seats
Regenerator Party	110
Progressive Party	31
Constituent Party	8
Portuguese Republican Party	2
Total	151
Source: Nohlen & Stöver

The results exclude the six seats won at national level and those from overseas territories.
