= 1869 in Portugal =

- Centuries: 17th; 18th; 19th; 20th; 21st
- Decades: 1840s; 1850s; 1860s; 1870s; 1880s
- See also: List of years in Portugal

Events in the year 1869 in Portugal.

== Incumbents ==
- Monarch: Louis I
- Prime Ministers: Bernardo de Sá Nogueira de Figueiredo, 1st Marquis of Sá da Bandeira (until 11 August); Nuno José Severo de Mendoça Rolim de Moura Barreto, 1st Duke of Loulé (starting 11 August)

== Events ==
- 27 February – King Louis signs a decree of the government, chaired by the Marquis Sá da Bandeira, abolishing slavery in all Portuguese territories.

== Births ==
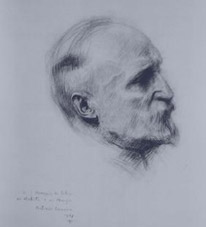
José Marques da Silva

- 18 October – José Marques da Silva, architect (died 1947)
- 24 November – Óscar Carmona, president (died 1951)

== Deaths ==
- 30 September – Francisco Luís Gomes, physician, writer, historian, economist, political scientist and MP (born 1829)
