= 1852 Portuguese legislative election =

- 12 December 1852

All 156 seats in the Chamber of Deputies 79 seats needed for a majority
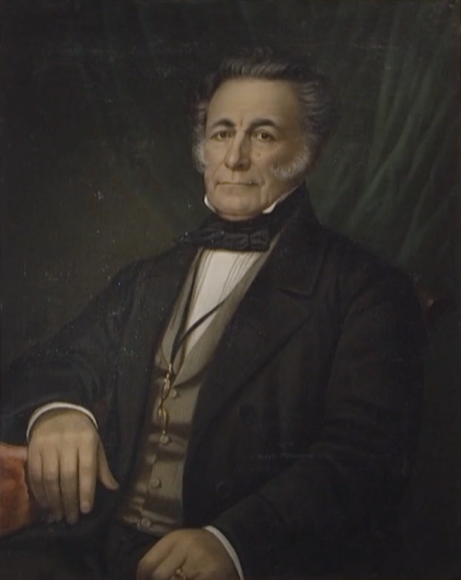

	First party	Second party
Leader	Rodrigo da Fonseca Magalhães
Party	Regenerator	Cartista
Last election	125 seats	34 seats
Seats won	121	35
Seats after	▼4	▲1
Prime Minister before election
1st Duke of Saldanha
Regenerator
Prime Minister after election
1st Duke of Saldanha
Regenerator

Legislative elections were held in Portugal on 12 December 1852.

== Results ==
Party	Seats	+/–
Regenerator Party	121	–4
Cartistas	35	+1
Total	156	–3
Source: ISCSP
