= 1900 Portuguese legislative election =

- 25 November 1900

All seats in the Chamber of Deputies
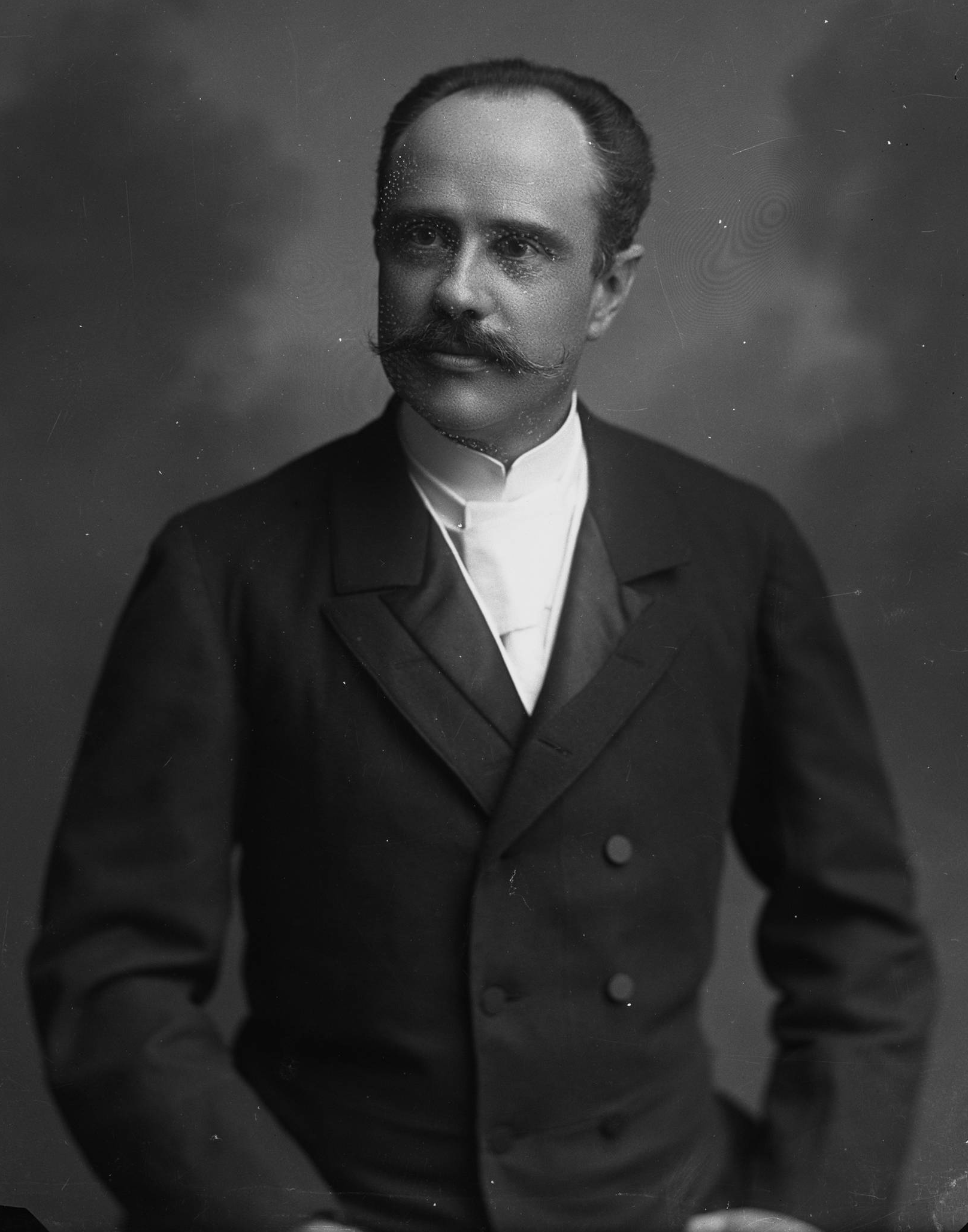

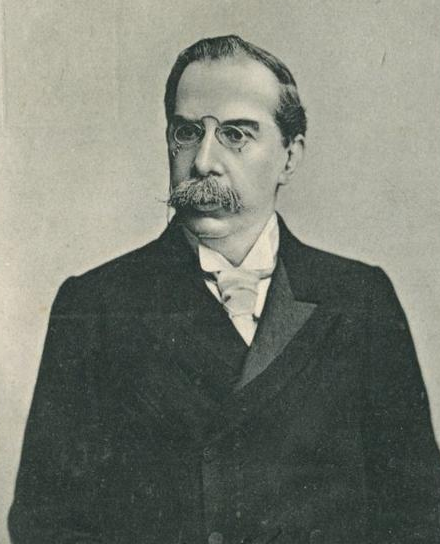
	First party	Second party
Leader	Ernesto Hintze Ribeiro	José Luciano de Castro
Party	Regenerator	Progressive
Seats won	104	28
Prime Minister before election
Ernesto Hintze Ribeiro
Regenerator
Prime Minister after election
Ernesto Hintze Ribeiro
Regenerator

Parliamentary elections were held in Portugal on 25 November 1900. The result was a victory for the Regenerator Party, which won 104 seats.

== Results ==
Party	Seats
Regenerator Party	104
Progressive Party	28
Other parties and independents	6
Total	138
Source: Nohlen & Stöver

The results exclude seats from overseas territories.
