= 1901 Portuguese legislative election =

- 6 October 1901

All seats in the Chamber of Deputies
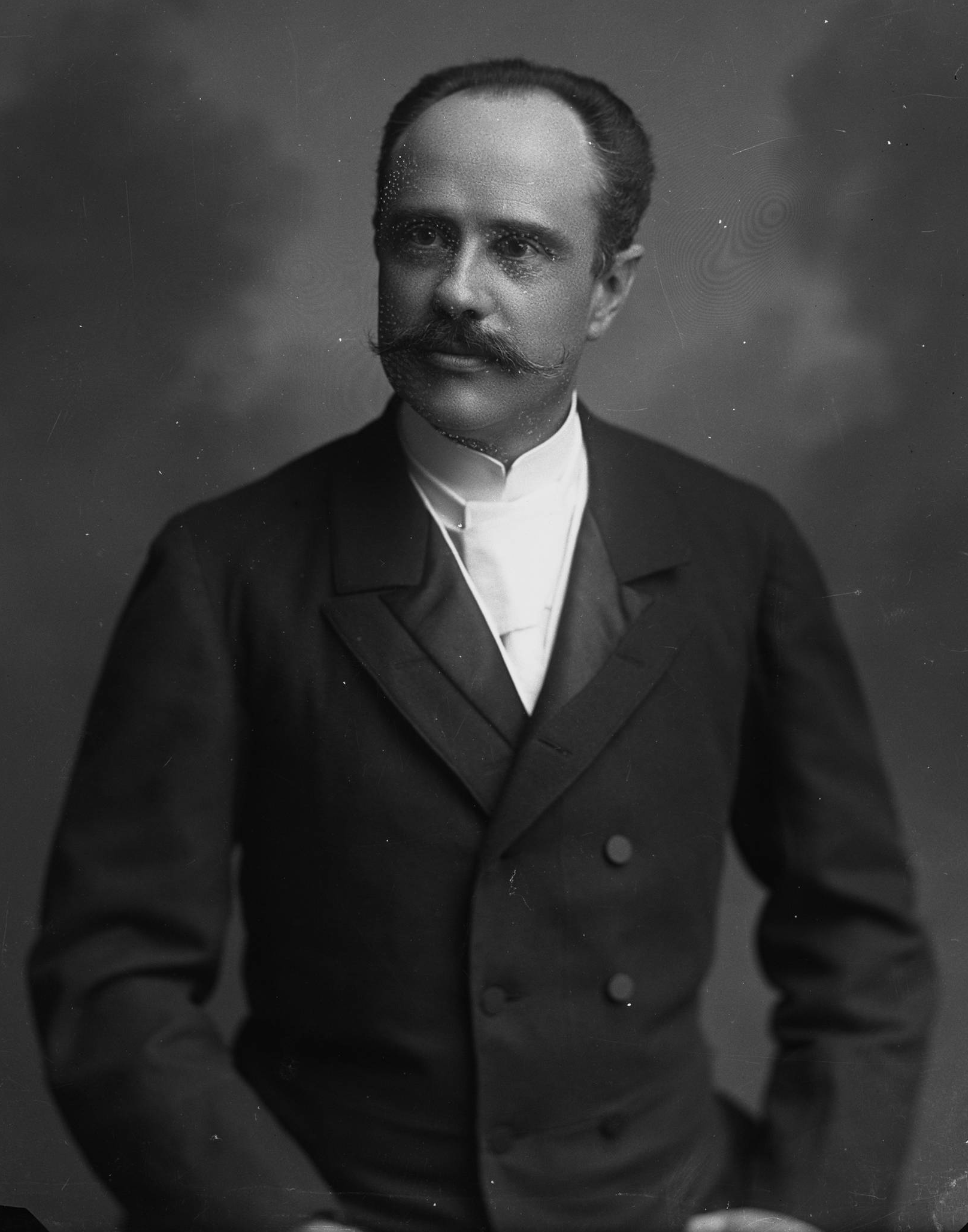

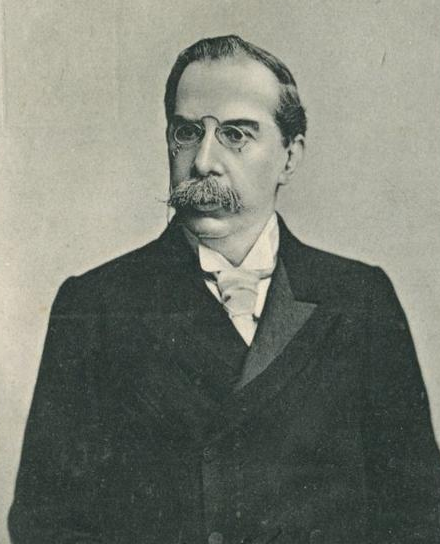

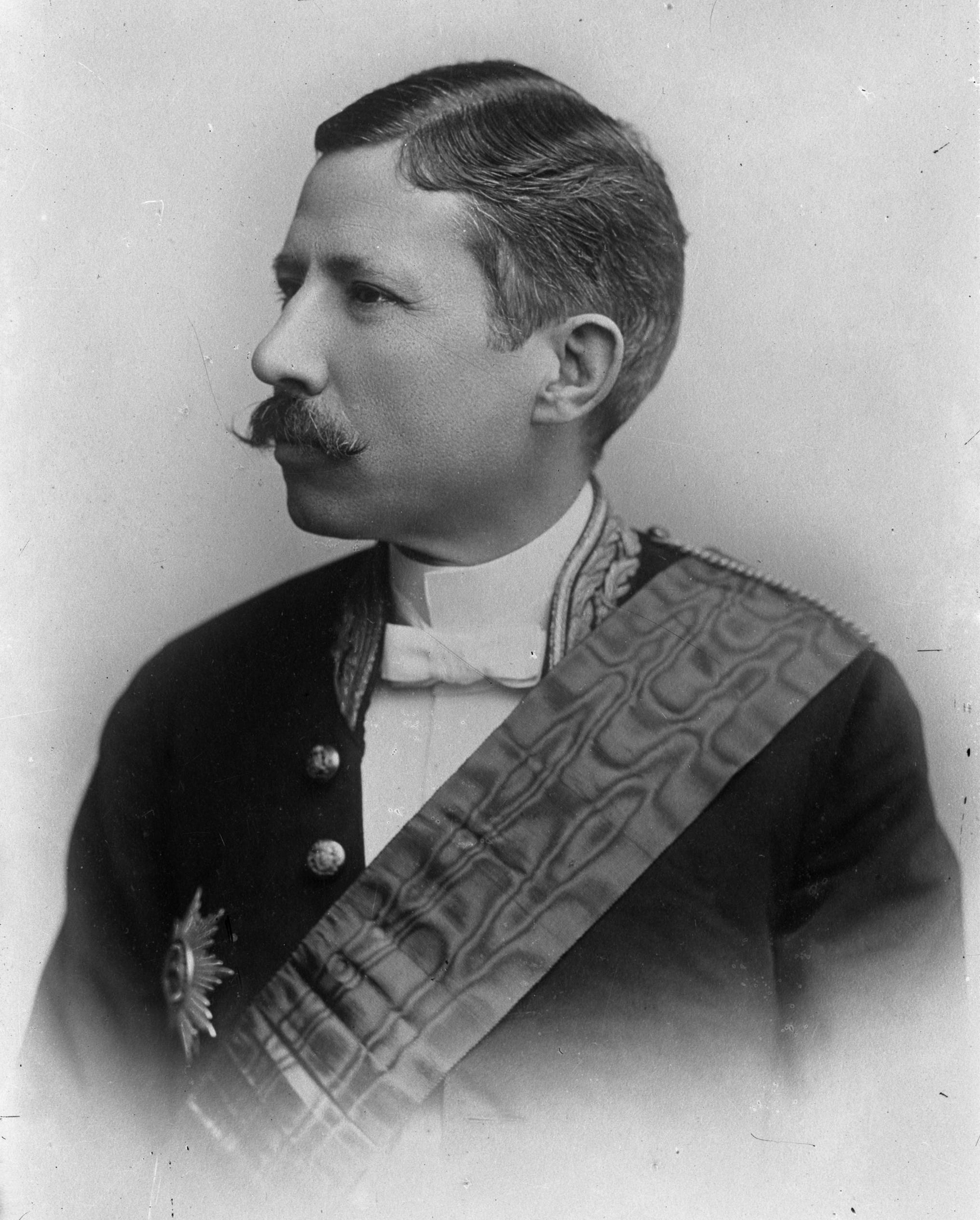
	First party	Second party	Third party
Leader	Ernesto Hintze Ribeiro	José Luciano de Castro	João Franco
Party	Regenerator	Progressive	PRL
Seats won	100	41	1
Prime Minister before election
Ernesto Hintze Ribeiro
Regenerator
Prime Minister after election
Ernesto Hintze Ribeiro
Regenerator

Parliamentary elections were held in Portugal on 6 October 1901, the third in three years. The result was a victory for the Regenerator Party, which won 100 seats.

== Results ==
Party	Seats
Regenerator Party	100
Progressive Party	41
Liberal Regenerator Party	1
Other parties and independents	6
Total	148
Source: Nohlen & Stöver

The results exclude seats from overseas territories.
