= Janeirinha =

In the history of Portugal, the Janeirinha (Portuguese: Little January) was the name of the movement which on 1 January 1868 protested against the tax on consumables and went on to carry out administrative reform of the country. With great support in the cities of Lisbon, Porto and Braga (a large demonstration in Porto on 1 January 1868 as part of this movement led to the local paper being called O Primeiro de Janeiro), the movement immediately caused the fall of the government on 4 January. This discontent caused the formation of a new government presided over by António José d'Ávila and, for some historians, marks the end of the Regeneration. For, besides the fall of the government, the Janeirinha also brought about a new arrangement of Portugal's political forces, leading to the formation of a new political party, the Reformist Party, opening the doors to a new and prolonged period of governmental instability, and putting an end to the stability imposed by the "regenerador" movement.
