= Regeneration (Portugal) =

In the history of Portugal, the Regeneration (Portuguese: Regeneração) is the name given to the period of the Portuguese Constitutional Monarchy after the military insurrection of 1 May 1851 that caused the end of Costa Cabral's tenure and of the Septembrist government. Despite the ministry that resulted from the strike, presided over by marshal Saldanha, the main person of the Regeneration was Fontes Pereira de Melo. Although it cannot be delimited definitely in the time, the period of the Regeneration endured for about 17 years, ending with the Janeirinha revolt in 1868, which brought the Reformist Party to power. The Regeneration was characterized by attempts to develop the country economically and modernize it, and the associated stringent fiscal measures.
