= Progressive Party (Portugal) =

Progressive Party Portuguese: Partido Progressista
- Abbreviation: PP
- Leader: Anselmo José Braamcamp
- Founded: 1876
- Dissolved: 1910
- Merger of: Historic Party; Reformist Party
- Headquarters: Lisbon
- Ideology: Constitutional monarchism Liberalism; Progressivism; Republicanism (minority)
- Political position: Centre-left
- Colors: Red

The Progressive Party (Portuguese: Partido Progressista), along with their opponent the Partido Regenerador, was a political party in Portugal during the constitutional monarchy at the end of the 19th century.

== Ideology ==
It developed from the Pact of Granja (7 September 1876), which fused the Historic Party and the Reformist Party, which both espoused liberal ideals, and had political opinions counter the Regenerator Party's leader (which included both left-leaning and conservative members), Fontes Pereira de Melo.

At the time, the Progressista and Regenerator parties were sociological and psychological different entities, causing factionalist divisions in society. A good example of this breach occurred in Seixal, where two philharmonic bands were established that supported the Partido Regenerador, the Timbre Seixalense, and the Sociedade Filarmónica União Seixalense (created in 1871), which supported the Partido Progressista.

The Progressistas (as they were referred) began their activities on 17 November 1876.

== History ==
The first Progressive Party government assumed their functions on 1 June 1879, under the Party leader Anselmo José Braamcamp, and would last until 25 March 1881. During its 664 days in office, the group promoted a program of morality and liberal idealism, supported by various important figures (such as José Luciano, Cardoso Machado, Henrique de Barros Gomes, Saraiva de Carvalho, João Crisóstomo and José Joaquim de Castro (the Marquis of Sabugosa and Viscount of São Januário). In their 19 October 1879 electoral victory, new faces were added, including António Cândido (who would be responsible for defending their program Vida Nova), Emídio Navarro and Veiga Beirão would be elected. In February 1885, the former socialist and nascent republican, Oliveira Martins, joins the party, declaring himself the inheritor of Passos. Carlos Lobo d’Ávila, would later join the party after Antero Quental declares that the Fontist regime would not evolve beyond a bureaucratic and financial oligarchy. In September 1885 Luciano de Castro was elected president of the Party (on 10 December 1885), supported by Barros Gomes and Oliveira Martins, while being opposed by Emídio Navarro and Mariano de Carvalho's faction.

In the elections of 30 March 1879, under the government of António Serpa there were 33 Progressista deputies, a number that would remain constant in the 23 October 1892 government of Dias Ferreira.

During the 6 March 1887 would form a majority with 113 of 169 seats, a feat that they would repeat, albeit with a reduced plurality in the 20 October 1889 election (retaining 104 deputies). From 20 February 1886 and 14 February 1890, a Progressive Party would govern under the party leadership of José Luciano, which included in his cabinet Veiga Beirão, Barros Gomes, Henrique de Macedo, Ressano Garcia, Emídio Navarro, Mariano de Carvalho, Augusto José da Cunha, Visconde de S. Januário, Eduardo José Coelho and Marino João Franzini.

During the government of Ernesto Hintze Ribeiro (April 1894), the number of Progressive deputies would fall to 11 representatives and for a time the Progressive party would form a liberal alliance with the Republican Party (1894–1895).

== Election results ==
Election	Leader	Seats	+/-	Government
1878	Anselmo José Braamcamp	22 / 137		Opposition
1879	Anselmo José Braamcamp	106 / 137	▲84	Government
1881	Anselmo José Braamcamp	6 / 137	▼100	Opposition
1884	Anselmo José Braamcamp	31 / 151	▲25	Opposition
1887	José Luciano de Castro	113 / 152	▲82	Government
1889	José Luciano de Castro	104 / 152	▼9	Government
1890	José Luciano de Castro	33 / 152	▼71	Opposition
1890	José Luciano de Castro	45 / 152	▲12	Opposition
1894	José Luciano de Castro	33 / 152	▼12	Opposition
1895	José Luciano de Castro	Boycotted		
1897	José Luciano de Castro	88 / 114	▲88	Government
1899	José Luciano de Castro	91 / 138	▲3	Government
1900	José Luciano de Castro	28 / 138	▼63	Opposition
1901	José Luciano de Castro	41 / 148	▲13	Opposition
1904	José Luciano de Castro	43 / 148	▲2	Opposition
1905	José Luciano de Castro	109 / 148	▲66	Government
Apr. 1906	José Luciano de Castro	19 / 148	▼90	Opposition
Aug. 1906	José Luciano de Castro	45 / 148	▲26	Opposition
1908	José Luciano de Castro	58 / 148	▲13	Opposition
1910	José Luciano de Castro	31 / 155	▼27	Opposition
