= Regenerator Party =

Regenerator Party Portuguese: Partido Regenerador
- Abbreviation: PR
- Leader: Duke of Saldanha Fontes Pereira de Melo
- Founded: 1851
- Dissolved: 1910
- Headquarters: Lisbon
- Ideology: Constitutional Monarchy; Conservatism
- Political position: Right-wing
- Religion: Roman Catholicism
- Colors: Blue

The Regenerator Party (Portuguese: Partido Regenerador) was a Portuguese political party. Along with their "rivals" the Progressive Party, they dominated politics in the Kingdom of Portugal in the second half of the 19th century and early 20th century. The Regenerator, Progressist, and other political parties in the late Kingdom of Portugal were all run by friends of the king.

== Election results ==
Election	Leader	Seats	+/-	Government
1851	Rodrigo da Fonseca Magalhães	125 / 159		Government
1852	Rodrigo da Fonseca Magalhães	121 / 156	▼4	Government
1852	Rodrigo da Fonseca Magalhães	41 / 162	▼80	Opposition
1858	Fontes Pereira de Melo	22 / 162	▼19	Opposition
1860	Fontes Pereira de Melo	162 / 179	▲140	Government
1861	Fontes Pereira de Melo	40 / 177	▼122	Opposition
1864	Fontes Pereira de Melo	32 / 177	▼8	Opposition
1868	Fontes Pereira de Melo	13 / 179	▼19	Opposition
1869	Fontes Pereira de Melo	5 / 107	▼8	Opposition
Mar. 1870	Fontes Pereira de Melo	14 / 107	▲9	Opposition
Sep. 1870	Fontes Pereira de Melo	12 / 107	▼2	Opposition
1871	Fontes Pereira de Melo	22 / 107	▲10	Opposition
1874	Fontes Pereira de Melo	78 / 107	▲56	Government
1878	Fontes Pereira de Melo	97 / 137	▲19	Government
1879	Fontes Pereira de Melo	21 / 137	▼76	Opposition
1881	Fontes Pereira de Melo	122 / 137	▲101	Government
1884	Fontes Pereira de Melo	110 / 151	▼12	Government
1887	António de Serpa Pimentel	36 / 152	▼74	Opposition
1889	António de Serpa Pimentel	38 / 152	▲2	Opposition
1890	António de Serpa Pimentel	115 / 152	▲77	Government
1890	António de Serpa Pimentel	103 / 152	▼12	Government
1894	António de Serpa Pimentel	101 / 152	▼2	Government
1895	António de Serpa Pimentel	114 / 114	▲13	Government
1897	António de Serpa Pimentel	23 / 114	▼91	Opposition
1899	António de Serpa Pimentel	39 / 138	▲16	Opposition
1900	Ernesto Hintze Ribeiro	104 / 138	▲65	Government
1901	Ernesto Hintze Ribeiro	100 / 148	▼4	Government
1904	Ernesto Hintze Ribeiro	100 / 148	0	Government
1905	Ernesto Hintze Ribeiro	32 / 148	▼68	Opposition
Apr. 1906	Ernesto Hintze Ribeiro	104 / 148	▲72	Government
Aug. 1906	Ernesto Hintze Ribeiro	24 / 148	▼80	Opposition
1908	Júlio de Vilhena	62 / 148	▲38	Government
1910	António Teixeira de Sousa	50 / 155	▼12	Government
