= Reformist Party (Portugal, 1868) =

Defunct 19th century Portuguese political party

Reformist Party Portuguese: Partido Reformista
- Abbreviation: PR
- Leader: António Alves Martins; 1st Marquis of Sá da Bandeira
- Founded: 1868
- Dissolved: 1876
- Split from: Historic Party
- Merged into: Progressive Party
- Headquarters: Lisbon
- Ideology: Constitutional Monarchy; Liberalism; Progressivism
- Political position: Centre-left
- Colors: Pink

The Reformist Party (Portuguese: Partido Reformista) was a Portuguese political party created as a breakaway from the Historic Party following an ideological split over the Janeirinha, which had overthrown the government of 1st Duke of Ávila. Those who supported the Janeirinha formed the Reformist Party, whilst those who opposed it stayed with the Historic Party.

The first leader of the party was António Alves Martins who led the movement until it solidified into a full fledged party in 1869 under the abolitionist, the 1st Marquis of Sá da Bandeira, who led the party until its dissolution. The Ávilist faction of the party broke away in 1870 in support of the 1st Duke of Ávila, but merged with the Regenerator Party only 4 years later.

The party came to an end with the Granja Pact, which was an agreement with the Historic Party to merge into one party, the Progressive Party, under the leadership of Anselmo José Braamcamp.
