= Historic Party =

Former political party of Portugal

Historic Party Portuguese: Partido Histórico
- Abbreviation: PH
- Leader: 1st Duke of Loulé
- Founded: 1852
- Dissolved: 1876
- Merged into: Progressive Party
- Headquarters: Lisbon
- Ideology: Constitutional Monarchy; Liberalism; Progressivism
- Political position: Centre
- Colors: Red

The Historic Party (Portuguese: Partido Histórico) was a Portuguese political party active between 1852 and 1876. It was founded by the 1st Duke of Loulé as new opposition to the new Regenerator Party, which had consolidated the Cartista political forces in the wake of the Regeneration, a military insurrection which overthrew the Septembrist government of Costa Cabral.

It integrated the opposition to the governments of the 1st Duke of Saldanha, and won a majority in the first election it contested in 1856. It was led from its inception in the wake of the defeat of the Progressive Historic Party in the 1852 election, by the 1st Duke of Loulé, who continued to represent the party until his death in 1875, leading several Historic governments.

Upon the death of the 1st Duke of Loulé, the Historic Party and the Reformist Party agreed on the Granja Pact, which merged the two parties into the Progressive Party, under the leadership of Anselmo José Braamcamp.
