= Chamber of Deputies of Portugal (1822–1910) =

Chamber of the Gentlemen Deputies of the Portuguese Nation Câmara dos Senhores Deputados da Nação Portuguesa

Type
- Type: Lower house of the Cortes Gerais

History
- Founded: 1822
- Disbanded: 1910

Leadership
- First President of the Chamber: Fr. Francisco de São Luís Saraiva
- Last President of the Chamber: José Capelo Franco Frazão, 1st Count of Penha Garcia
- Seats: 148

Meeting place
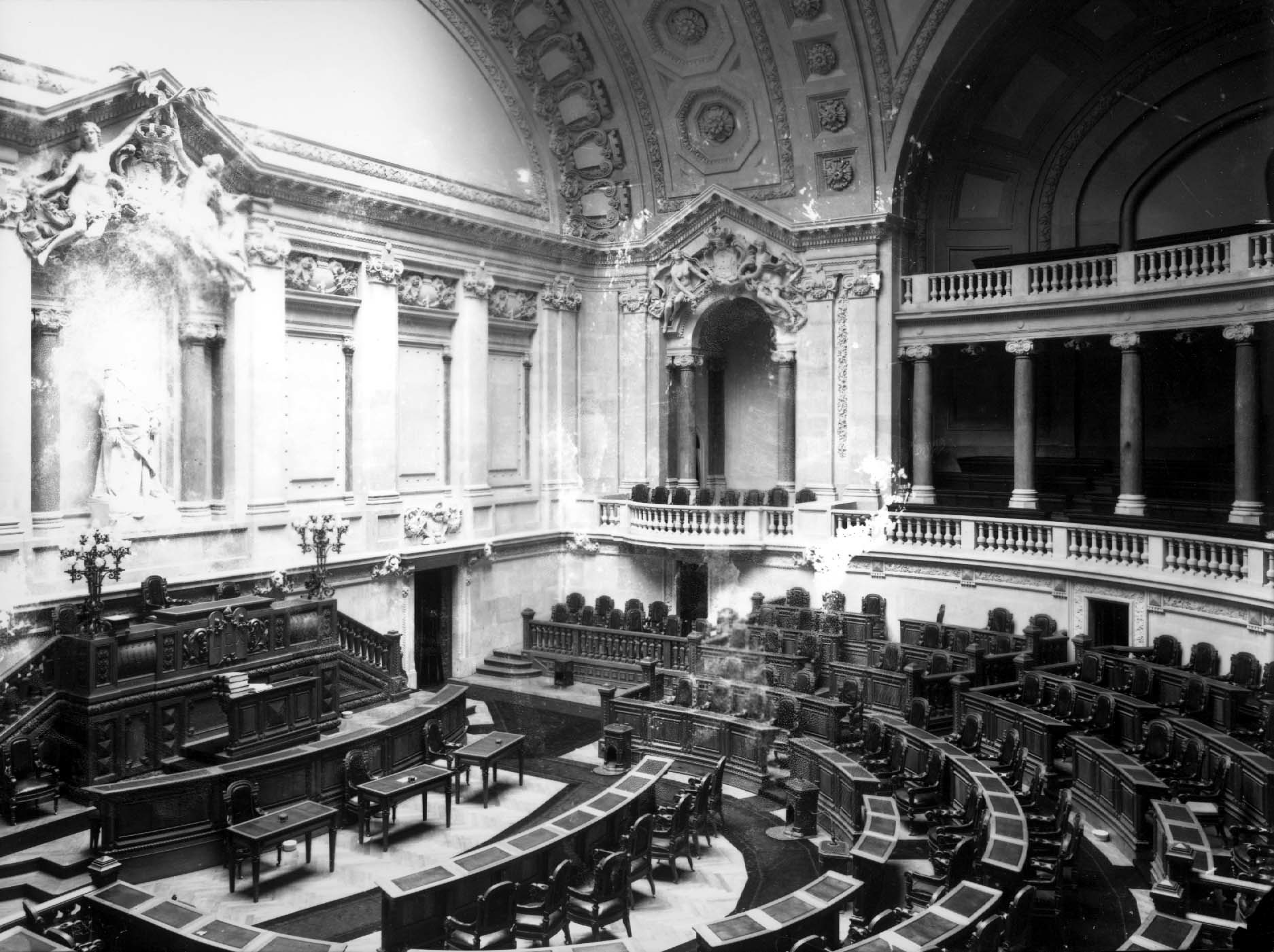
- São Bento Palace; Lisbon, Kingdom of Portugal

The Chamber of Deputies of Portugal, alternatively translatable as the House of Commons and formally styled the Chamber of the Gentlemen Deputies of the Portuguese Nation (Portuguese: Câmara dos Deputados or Câmara dos Senhores Deputados da Nação Portuguesa) was the lower house of the Cortes Gerais, the legislature of the Kingdom of Portugal during most of the constitutional monarchy period. The Chamber of Deputies directly represented the Portuguese Nation, elected through direct suffrage of the electoral circuits corresponding to the districts of Portugal. During the First Republic, the Chamber of Deputies was remodeled after the US House of Representatives.

== History ==
The Chamber was created in 1826 with the Constitutional Charter.
