= Pinto =

Origin
- Language: Portuguese
- Meaning: Painted or lively
- Region of origin: Portuguese-speaking world, as well as Spain, Italy, India,

Other names
- Cognate: Pinter
- See also: Pinto bean, Ford Pinto, Pinto horse

Pinto is a Portuguese surname. It is a high-frequency surname in all Portuguese-speaking countries and is also widely present in Spanish-speaking countries, Italy, India (especially in Mangalore, Karnataka), France and Israel.

In many languages, Pinto means "coloured" or "painted" as it derives from the Late Latin pinctus and Classical Latin pictus, and in some cases, at least from the same word in the sense "lively or restless person". It is linguistically related to the name of Christopher Columbus' ship La Pinta, meaning "The Painted One", "The Look", or "The Spotted One". Also related, though greatly diverging in meaning, is the unit of measurement pint, which comes from the Old French word pinte and perhaps ultimately from Vulgar Latin pincta meaning "painted", for marks painted on the side of a container to show capacity.

== Origins ==
Surname of one of the oldest lineages in Portugal, according to the nobiliaries it derives from Paio Soares Pinto, documented in the cartulary called "Baio Ferrado" of the Grijó monastery, in a deed from April 1156, where he appears as "Pelagio Pinto", also referred to in the same document as "Pelagio Suariz, cognomento Pinto" or Paio Soares, "said Pinto". This knight lived on his estate at Paço in Feira, during the time of Henry, Count of Portugal. Amado de Azambuja says that he was already deceased in 1126, (Note: Spurious date, as it should be 1156, as documented in other sources.) date on which his widow, Maria Mendes (daughter of Mendo Odoriz), sold the said estate to the Grijó monastery in her name and that of her daughters. She was the daughter and heiress of Maior Pais Pinto, married to D. Egas Mendes de Gundar, knight who participated alongside D. Afonso Henriques, in the battle of Ourique (1139). This would be the son of Mendo de Gundar.

From the aforementioned couple there was a notable spread of this surname, especially in the area of Ferreiros de Tendais, parish of the municipality of Cinfães, where the Torre da Chã was located, also known as «Torre dos Pintos».

Indeed, the Pintos maintained a prominent social position in the Portuguese landscape.

The aforementioned Torre da Chã estate was leased by the crown, at the beginning of the 14th century, to the knight Vasco Martins Pinto. According to the writer and genealogist Manuel Abranches de Soveral, the great-grandson of this Vasco Martins, called Vasco Rodrigues Pinto (known by the nickname "the one from Ceuta" for having participated in its conquest in 1415), received from John I of Portugal, on March 13, 1423, the favor of having the Torre da Chã estate free, for which until then the Pinto family paid rent to the crown.

== Heraldry ==
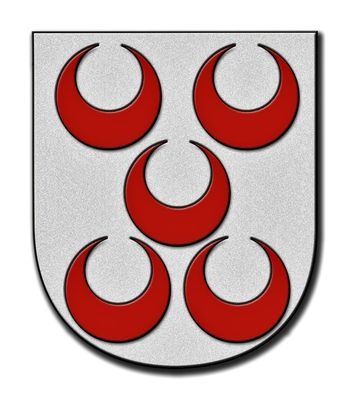
Coat of arms of the Pinto Family

There is a heraldic-genealogical legend in a 17th-century manuscript, designated "Armaria," located in the reserve collection of the National Library, folio 259 vº, which states that it is:

"Tradition of those with this surname - To the first of this family, King D. Afonso Henriques said in Campo de Ourique, seeing that he was very wounded and stained with the blood of the Moors: 'As you come, Pinto (stained/painted), with blood,' and from this he got the surname and the moons he took for winning them in a battle against the Moors. This battle took place in the Serra do Arestal, two leagues from Arouca, near Arões, in the battle that Count Vermudes Forjaz and Pedro Fernandes de Almeida, cousin of Afonso Annes Pinto, had with Almançor..." Adding that the expression "as you come, Pinto (d)e sange" was a way of speaking from that time. Pinto today is (s)t(ar). Tinto, or painted. Recent works also mention that, "Some authors say that the nickname derives from a moniker motivated by a knight returning from a battle with his armor and the rest of his attire splattered with drops of blood."

The arms of this lineage: A silver shield, with five red crescents. Crest: a silver leopard, armed and langued red, with a crescent from the shield on its shoulder.

The heraldic symbolism of this lineage, "five red crescents," is a clear allusion to victories over the Moors, representing the banners taken from the Saracens in combat, thus referring to the period of the Christian reconquest.

== Politicians ==
- Abelardo Pinto Guatemalan politician
- Alcino Pinto (1950s–2020), São Toméan politician
- Aníbal Pinto (1825–1884), President of Chile from 1876 to 1881
- António Pinto Soares (1780–1865), Head of State of Costa Rica in 1842
- Carlos Mota Pinto (1936–1985), Portuguese politician
- Cyril Pinto Jayatilake Seneviratne (1918–1984), Sri Lankan Sinhala military officer and politician
- Elsa Teixeira Pinto, São Toméan politician
- Filipa Pinto (born 1971), Portuguese politician
- Francisco Antonio Pinto (1785–1858), President of Chile from 1827 to 1829
- Francisco Pinto Balsemão (1937–2025), Prime Minister of Portugal from 1981 to 1983
- Germán Serrano Pinto (1940–2016), Vice President of Costa Rica from 1990 to 1994
- Ignacio Pinto (1723-1797), head of the Pinto family that revolted against the Portuguese colonialists in Portuguese India
- João Franco (1855–1929), Prime Minister of Portugal from 1906 to 1908
- John Pinto (politician) (1924–2019), Democratic member of the New Mexico Senate
- Jorge Pinto (born 1987), Portuguese politician
- José Antonio Pinto Castro (1817–1887), Costa Rican Vice President, politician, and judge
- José Concepción Pinto Castro (1829–1898), Costa Rican judge and politician
- José de Magalhães Pinto (1909–1996), Brazilian governor who successfully led a military coup d'etat of the Brazilian government in 1964
- José María Orellana Pinto (1872–1926), President of Guatemala from 1921 to 1926
- José Sócrates Carvalho Pinto de Sousa (born 1957), Prime Minister of Portugal from 2005 to 2011
- Lakshman Pinto Jayatilaka Senewiratne (born 1957), Sri Lankan Sinhala Member of Parliament
- Manuel Guillermo Pinto (1783–1853), Argentinian general
- Manuel Pinto da Costa (born 1937), economist and President of São Tomé and Príncipe from 1975 to 1991 and 2011 to 2016
- Manuel Pinto da Fonseca (1681–1773), Portuguese nobleman and Grand Master of the Order of Saint John and sovereign over Malta
- Mário Pinto de Andrade (1928–1990), Angolan politician and poet
- Manuel Pinto (Scouting) (1938–2008), Ugandan parliamentarian and Chief Scout
- Pio Gama Pinto (1927–1965), Kenyan politician
- Sérgio Sousa Pinto (born 1972), Portuguese politician and Member of the European Parliament
- Shirly Pinto (born 1989), Israeli deaf activist and politician

== Sports players ==
- Antoine Pinto, (born 1991), French Muay Thai kickboxer
- António Pinto (runner) (born 1966), Portuguese long-distance runner
- Dirceu José Pinto (1980–2020), Brazilian Paralympic boccia player
- João Pinto (footballer, born 1961), Portuguese footballer and manager of FC Porto
- João Vieira Pinto (born 1971), Portuguese footballer
- José Manuel Pinto (born 1975), Spanish footballer
- Keivi Pinto (born 1979), Venezuelan judoka
- Pepe Pinto (1929–2024), Spanish footballer and coach
- Rafael Pinto Pedrosa (born 2007), German footballer
- Raffaele Pinto (1945–2020), Italian racing driver
- René Pinto (baseball) (born 1996), Venezuelan baseball player
- Renyel Pinto (born 1982), baseball pitcher
- Ricardo Pinto (baseball) (born 1994), Venezuelan baseball player
- Ricardo Pinto (footballer, born 1965), Brazilian footballer
- Ricardo Sá Pinto (born 1972), former Portuguese international footballer and present coach
- Roberto Pinto (Brazilian footballer) (1937–1994), Brazilian footballer
- Shane Pinto (born 2000), American ice hockey player

== Religious leaders ==
- Chaim Pinto (1748–1845), leading rabbi in Morocco
- Evarist Pinto (born 1933), Pakistani Catholic priest, 4th Archbishop of Karachi, Pakistan
- Isaac de Pinto (1717–1787), Jewish philosophe and scholar who was a key investor in the Dutch East India Company
- Josiah ben Joseph Pinto (1565–1648), Syrian rabbi and author
- Yoshiyahu Yosef Pinto (born 1973), Israeli Jewish spiritual leader and Kabbalist
- Zinia Pinto (1929–2013), Pakistani Catholic nun and teacher

== Explorers ==
- Alexandre de Serpa Pinto (aka Serpa Pinto; 1846–1900), Portuguese explorer of southern Africa and colonial administrator
- Fernão Mendes Pinto (c. 1509–1583), Portuguese explorer and writer

== Writers ==
- Clara Pinto-Correia (1960–2025), Portuguese novelist, journalist and educator
- Ricardo Pinto (novelist) (born 1961), UK-based fantasy writer
- Sara Pinto Coelho (1913–1990), Portuguese writer of fiction and plays
- Silvia Corzo (born 1973), Colombian lawyer, journalist and newscaster
- Vivian de Sola Pinto (1895–1969), British poet, literary critic and historian

== Academics ==
- Aníbal Pinto Santa Cruz (1919–1996), Chilean economist
- Diana Pinto (born 1949), intellectual historian on Jewish identity
- Jorge Pinto Rodríguez (born 1944), Chilean historian
- Nina Pinto-Abecasis (1971–2019), Israeli folklorist, writer and educator

== Other ==
- Freida Pinto (born 1984), Indian model and actress
- Dan Pinto (born 1960), American composer, keyboardist and drummer-percussionist
- Dani Pinto (born 1958), football manager
- Filipe Pinto (born 1988), Portuguese singer and winner of 2009/2010 Ídolos
- George Pinto (composer) (1785–1806), English composer and keyboard virtuoso
- Giovanni Battista Emanuele Pinto (c. 1723–1749), Ottoman Tripolitanian former slave and rebel leader
- Joaquim Pinto (born 1957), Portuguese film director
- Jorge Nuno Pinto da Costa (1937–2025), Portuguese sports executive, President of sports club F.C. Porto from 1982 until 2024
- Malucha Pinto (born 1955), Chilean actress and dramatist
- Maria Pinto (fashion designer) (born 1957), American fashion designer
- Olivério Pinto (1896–1981), Brazilian ornithologist and physician
- Oreste Pinto (1889–1961), Dutch counterintelligence officer
- Paulo Xisto Pinto Jr. (born 1969), Brazilian bassist of the heavy metal band Sepultura
- Sam Pinto (born 1989), Filipina model and actress
- Rui Pinto, Portuguese whistleblower
- Thomas Pinto (1728–1773), British violinist

== People with the given name or nickname ==
- Pinto Colvig (1892–1967), American actor and cartoonist
- Pinto Itamaraty (born 1960), Brazilian politician
- Pinto Machado (1926–2009), Portuguese footballer

== See also ==
- Pinter (surname)
