= Municipal Library Elevator Coup =

1908 attempted coup in Portugal

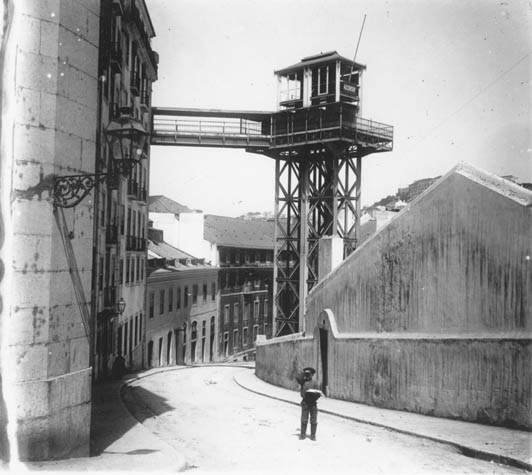
- The Municipal Elevator, also referred to as the Library Elevator as seen from the Calçada de São Francisco
- Date: January 28, 1908
- Location: Lisbon, Portugal
- Also known as: The Elevator Coup; 28 January 1908 Coup
- Participants: King Carlos I of Portugal; João Franco; José Maria de Alpoim; Afonso Costa; Francisco Correia Herédia; António José de Almeida; Luz de Almeida; João Chagas
- Outcome: Arrests initially, leading to the Lisbon Regicide

The Municipal Library Elevator Coup (Portuguese: Golpe do Elevador da Biblioteca), also known as The Elevator Coup (Intentona do Elevador) or 28 January 1908 Coup (Golpe de 28 de Janeiro de 1908), was the name given for the attempted coup d'état in Lisbon, capital of Portugal, by members of the Portuguese Republican Party and Progressive Dissidency against the administrative dictatorship of Prime Minister João Franco (and the political ascendancy of the Liberal Regenerator Party). The event was not confined to the Municipal Library Elevator, but was so named for the arrest of many conspirators at the structure on the afternoon of 28 January 1908. Although the coup was prevented by government forces, it failed to capture all the conspirators, which contributed to the assassination of the monarch Carlos I of Portugal and the heir to the throne, the Prince Royal, Luís Filipe. These events would continue legislative instability and lead to the Portuguese First Republic, the raison d'être of the coup conspirators.

== Background ==
Since King Carlos I of Portugal had decided to support the Liberal-Regenerator leader João Franco and allow him to run the government as an administrative dictatorship (without parliament, but maintaining civil liberties), the parties in the Cortes had vocally rebelled. The traditional parties (the Regenerator and Progressive Parties) were the most critical, since they were fearful of losing their political clout within the rotativist system that existed (an inefficient system of rotating governments in which the main parties alternated via gentlemen's agreements). The Progressive Dissidency, which had been created exclusively by José Maria de Alpoim to obtain power, was likewise positioned in a way to remain on the fringes of power. Although it was officially monarchist, the Party was willing to abandon its platform in order to align itself with the Portuguese Republican Party, at the time a radical group of socialists, anarchists and nationalists intent on taking power by force. João Franco was also interested in marginalizing the Republicans by co-opting many of the planks of the other parties in order to form a program that would reduce the existing political instability. The election of 5 April 1908, which could have ushered in a legislative victory for João Franco's Liberal-Regenerators, and possibly installed a functional parliament, united the leaders of the Dissidency and Republican Party in a conspiracy to take power by force. The Dissidency would provide the money and arms; and the Republicans, with their contacts within Portuguese secret societies (principally the Carbonária and Freemasons) would provide the men.

== Plans ==
Originally, the conspirators hoped to force the abdication of the King Carlos I, but decided on proclaiming a republic as the better goal. Various versions of the plan existed, although they all shared the same goal of removing the dictator João Franco without forcing the intervention of the military, and thus escalating the conflict into a civil war. In its final version, brigades of Carbonária would neutralize the lines of communication, the mounted cavalry in the Largo do Carmo, the Municipal Guard in the Largo dos Lóios, the barracks in the Cabeço de Bola and the naval officers in the Vale de Zebo, while the remaining conspirators would take the municipal office buildings and eliminate João Franco.

On 27 January 1908 the plan to remove the dictator was approved by Afonso Costa and Francisco Correia Herédia (Viscount of Ribeira Brava) for both groups of dissidents. Meanwhile, other conspirators were not only interested in removing João Franco, but also eliminating the King. This change in plans is harder to pinpoint, but a recent study points to the end of 1907. José Maria Alpoim, who associated with members of the Carbonária, was responsible for a plan to acquire arms, promulgate a revolution, and two plans to execute the Prime Minister and the monarch. Whether republican leaders were aware of these plans is unclear; the relationships that existed between the conspirators and instigators of the coupe were later suppressed. But, these competing motivations likely played a part in the disorganization on the eve of the coupe, which was planned for either 31 January or 1 February.

Regardless, the confidence of the conspirators was so high that a shop-owner, Vitor dos Santos, attempted to bribe a police officer to join the conspiracy. The officer, after seeing a box of explosives (which the proprietor presented him) reported of the conspiracy to his superiors. Informed of the possible conspiracy in the works, João Franco ordered the imprisonment of Republican leader António José de Almeida, the Carbonária head Luz de Almeida, the republican journalist João Chagas and other suspects, as well as ordering the reinforcement of strategic points throughout Lisbon.

== Attempted coup ==
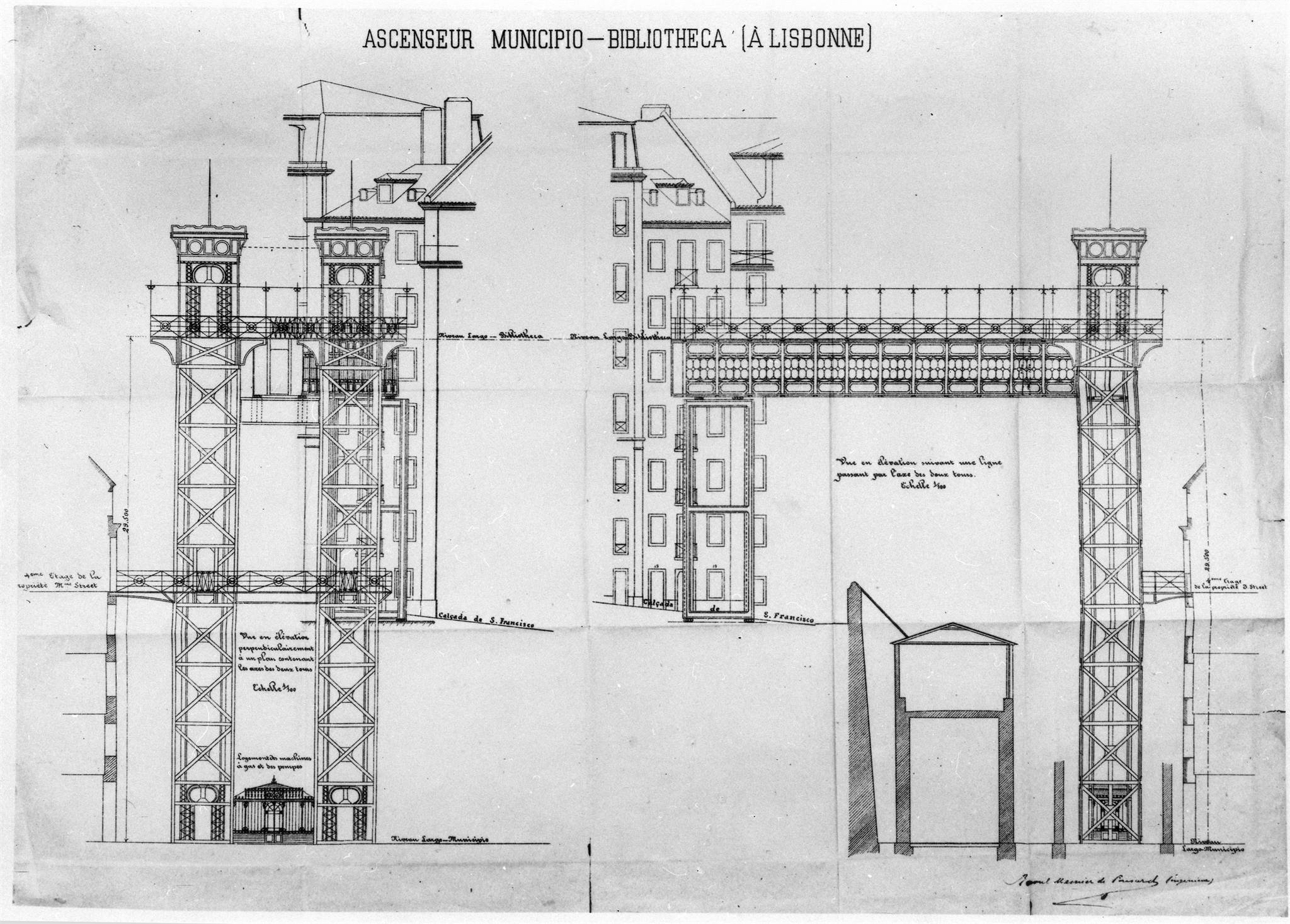
Plans of the Elevator of São Julião, showing the profile between the two squares

With the leadership of the movement almost decapitated, it fell to Afonso Costa to salvage the group's plans. The government had placed many sites under observation and the military was supported by government forces. A few, still belligerent conspirators, attempted to attack these forces in the bairro of Rato, in the civil parish of Alcântara, at the Campo de Santana and along the Rua da Escola Politécnica: one policeman was killed.

Alfredo Luís da Costa, supported by members of the Progressive Dissidency, took their positions under the conspirator's plan, at the Municipal Library Elevator. The Municipal Elevator, also known as the Library Elevator or Elevator of São Julião, was the seventh public elevator to be constructed in Lisbon. It was inaugurated on 12 January 1897 under the supervision of its designer, Raoul Mesnier du Ponsard, and operated until 1915 when it was permanently taken out of service. It connected the Largo da Biblioteca near the Municipal Library (today, the Academy of Fine Arts) with the municipal square, Largo de São Julião (today, the Praça do Município), through the buildings at 13 Largo de S. Julião and the terrace of the Palácio do Visconde de Coruche.

Waiting for confirmation from the leadership to execute their plans, and hopeful of a turn in the events, many of the remaining conspirators begin to congregate at the Elevator. Their appearance was scrutinized by a policeman, who became suspicious because the Elevator was out of service. He called for reinforcements, and a group of officers detained and arrested the group of men, which included Afonso Costa, António Egas Moniz, Álvaro Poppe, Francisco Correia de Herédia (the Viscount of Ribeira Brava) and others. While José Maria de Alpoim was able to escape to Spain, in all 100 people were arrested during the crackdown, including the Viscounts of Pedralva and Ameal, João Pinto dos Santos, Cassiano Neves and Batalha de Freitas. The coup was crushed.

== Aftermath ==
With the coup conspirators imprisoned, the King signed a decree (written by João Franco) to establish sentences of exile or expulsion to the colonies for those individuals caught for contravening regulations of public order (signed at the palace of Vila Viçosa on 30 January). The King and Royal Family returned to the capital on 1 February 1908 to present a semblance of order, following a route through the Terreiro do Paço to the Palácio das Necessidades. But, even though the coup leaders were imprisoned, the square was encircled by gunmen of the Carbonária, who assassinated the King and Prince Royal in what became known as the Lisbon Regicide. Although the assassins ignored João Franco's carriage, he was held responsible for the lack of police security and a naive over-confidence that allowed the monarch to travel in an uncovered landau.

The assassination failed to overthrow the monarchy immediately. The traditional parties were able to impose an acclamation solution, with the establishment of a unity government presided over by an independent (Francisco Joaquim Ferreira do Amaral), the ostracising of João Franco's supporters, and the repeal of Francist decrees.

However, the death of the King and heir apparent caused continuing instability, which led to ultimate success for the republicans. The acclamation policies were effectively a surrender: many of the conspirators were released from prison, the assassins (who had been killed in the square) were eulogized as martyrs, and the criminal investigation was rendered ineffective. These events only encouraged the republicans to attempt another coup d'état 33 months later, led by the same people, that succeeded in establishing the Portuguese First Republic. The events that gave rise to the attempted coup on 28 January were the last attempts to reform the constitutional monarchy.

== Sources ==
- Morais, Jorge (2007). Regicídio: A Contagem Decrescente [Regicide: The Untold Story] (in Portuguese). Lisbon: Zéfiro. ISBN 978-972-8958-40-4.
- Pinto, José Manuel de Castro (2007). D. Carlos (1863–1908): A Vida e o Assassinato de um Rei [D. Carlos (1863–1908): The Life and Assassination of a King] (in Portuguese). Lisbon: Plátano Editora. ISBN 978-972-770-563-4.
- Ramos, Rui (2006). D. Carlos (in Portuguese). Lisbon: Círculo de Leitores. ISBN 972-42-3587-4.
- Correia, Octaviano (9 August 2007), Correia, Henrique (ed.), Do Pombal ao Bom Jesus de Braga [From Pombal to Bom Jesus of Braga] (in Portuguese), Jornal da Madeira, archived from the original on November 13, 2007
- Ferrero, Paulo (28 April 2008), O Elevador de São Julião [The Elevator of São Julião] (in Portuguese), Lisbon: Observatório de Baixo
