= April 1906 Portuguese legislative election =

- 29 April 1906

All seats in the Chamber of Deputies
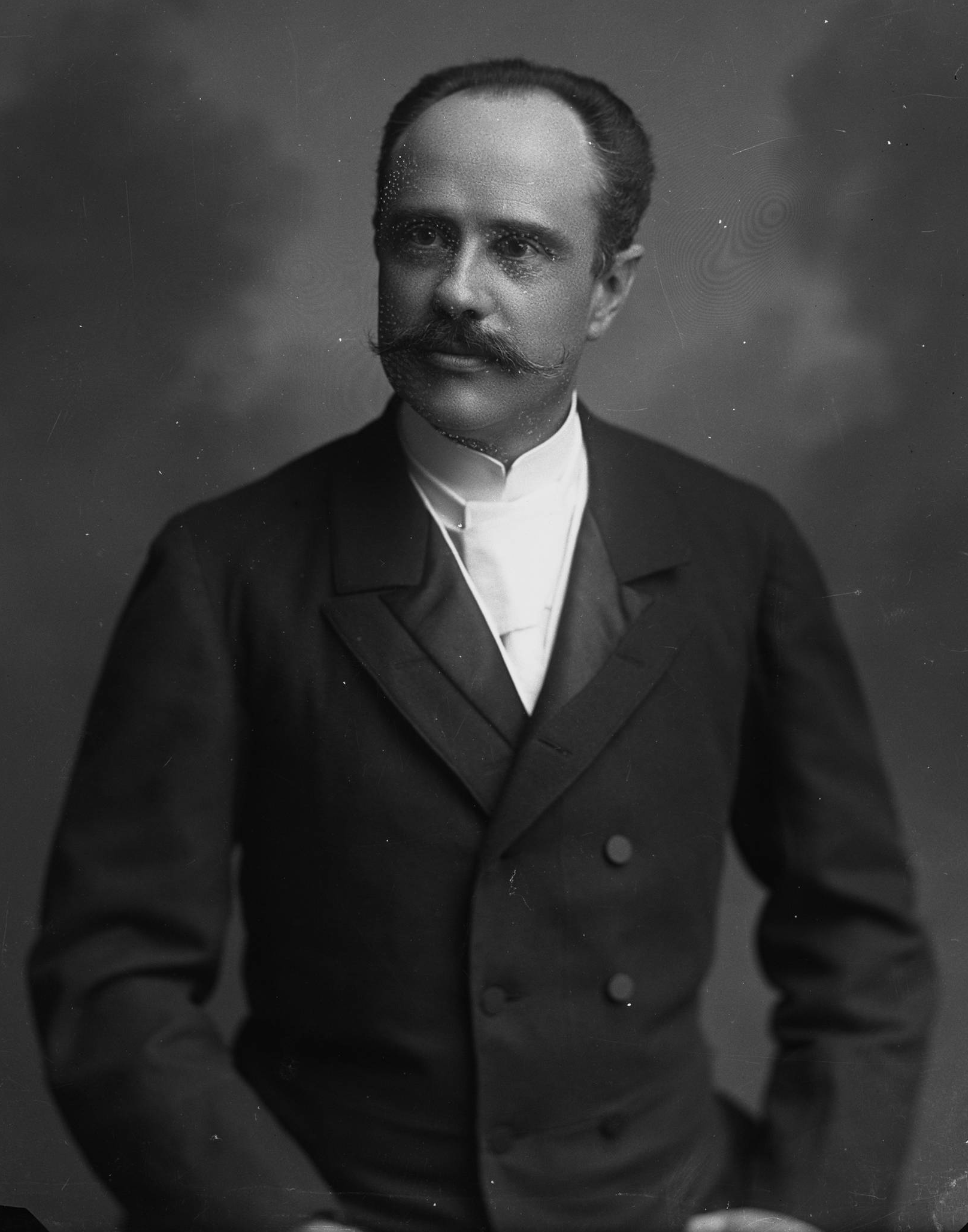

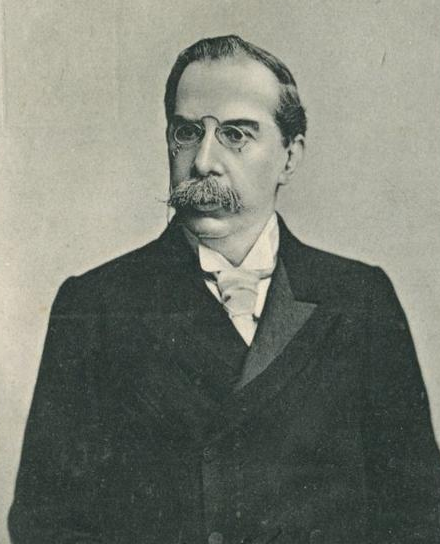

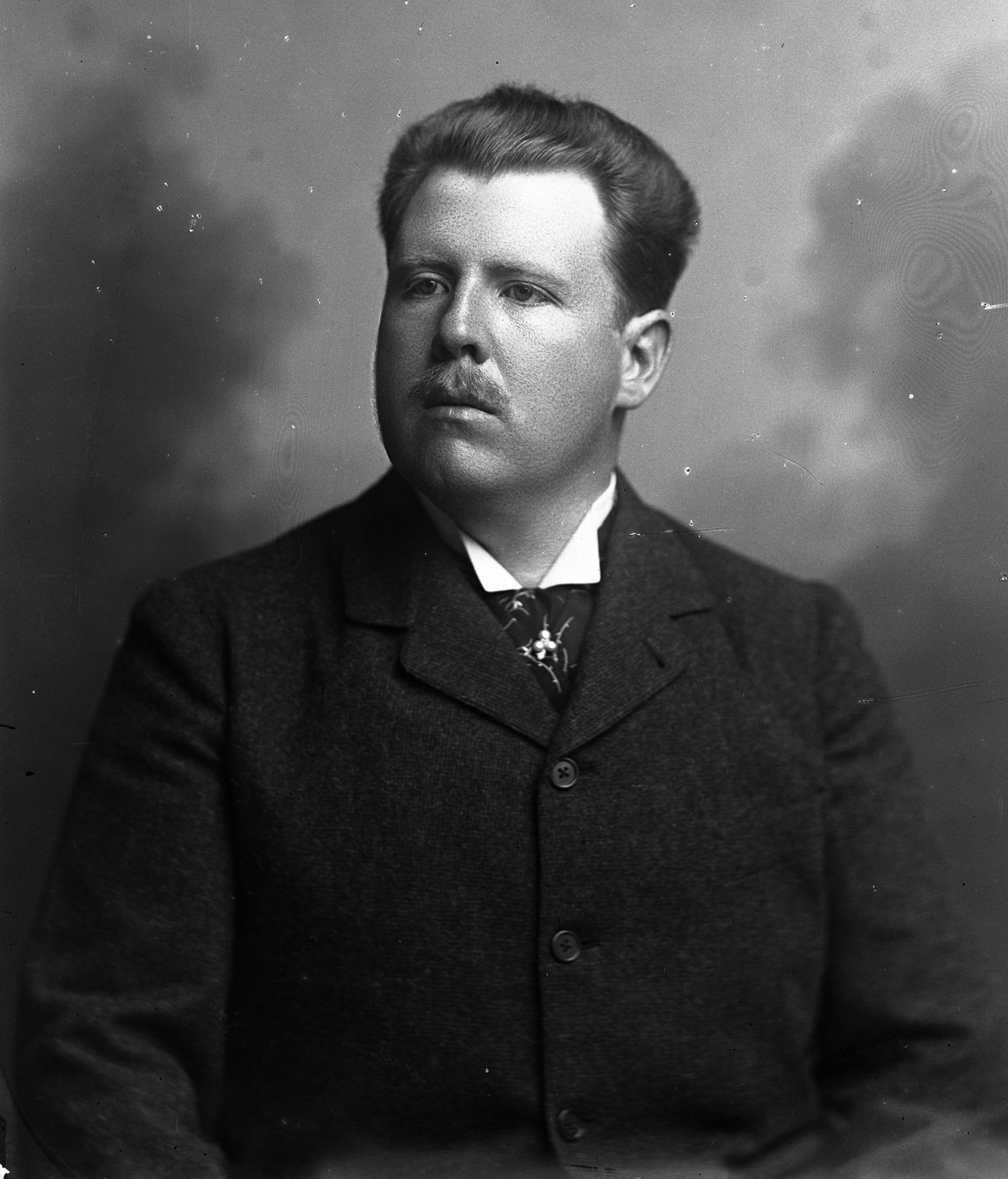

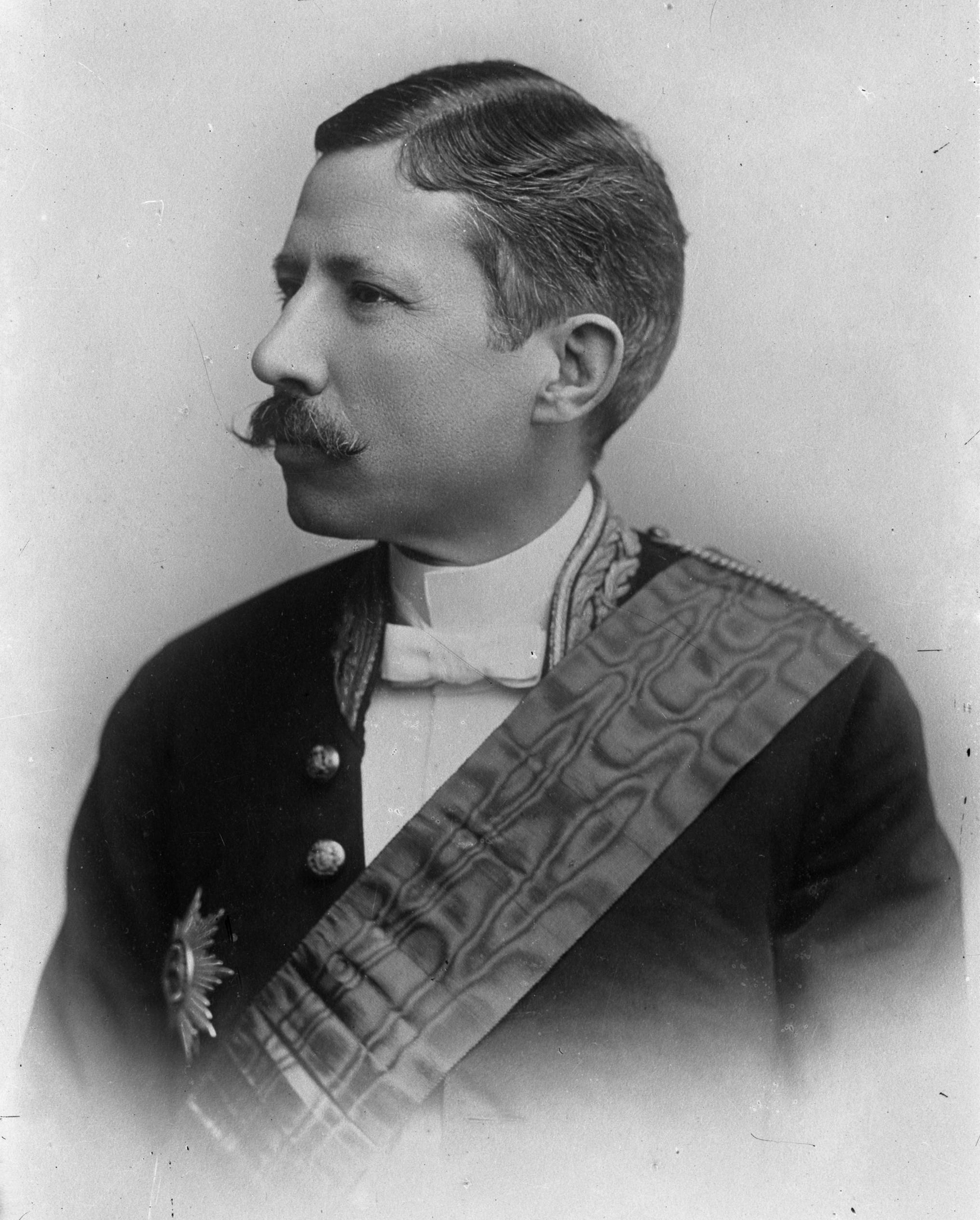
	First party	Second party
Leader	Ernesto Hintze Ribeiro	José Luciano de Castro
Party	Regenerator	Progressive
Seats won	104	19
	Third party	Fourth party
Leader	José Maria de Alpoim	João Franco
Party	DP	PRL
Seats won	9	7
Prime Minister before election
Ernesto Hintze Ribeiro
Regenerator
Prime Minister after election
Ernesto Hintze Ribeiro
Regenerator

Parliamentary elections were held in Portugal on 29 April 1906. The result was a victory for the Regenerator Party, which won 104 seats. The one elected Portuguese Republican Party MP refused to take his seat in protest at electoral fraud.

== Results ==
Party	Votes	%	Seats
Regenerator Party			104
Progressive Party			19
Progressive Dissidence			9
Liberal Regenerator Party			7
Portuguese Republican Party			1
Other parties and independents			8
Total			148
Total votes	491,287	–	
Registered voters/turnout	677,693	72.49	
Source: Nohlen & Stöver

The results exclude seats from overseas territories.
