= August 1906 Portuguese legislative election =

- 19 August 1906

All seats in the Chamber of Deputies
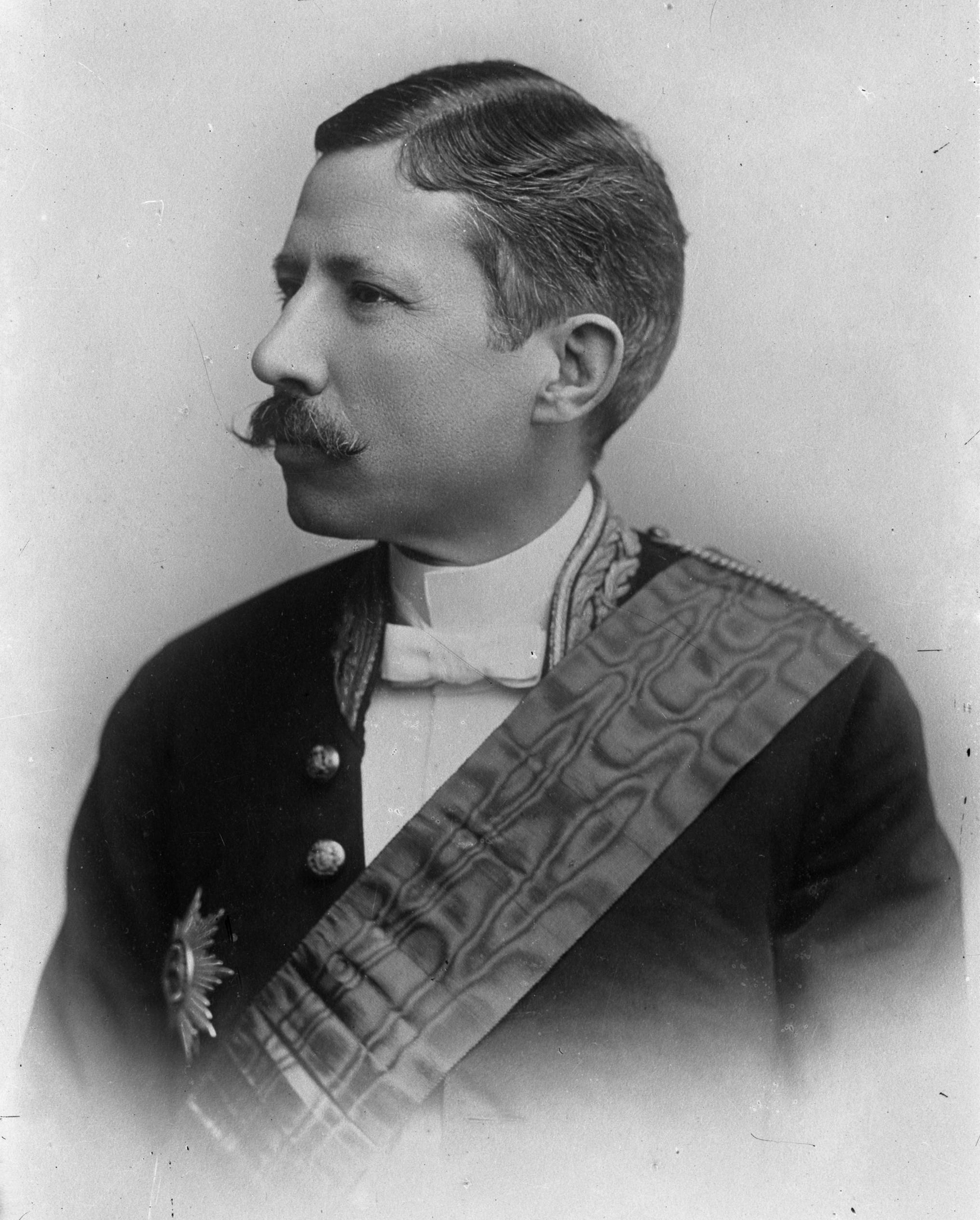

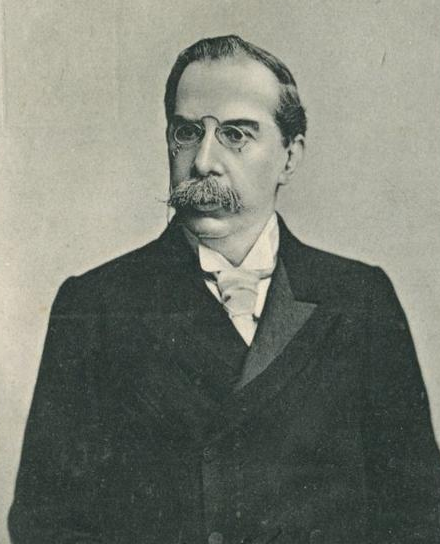

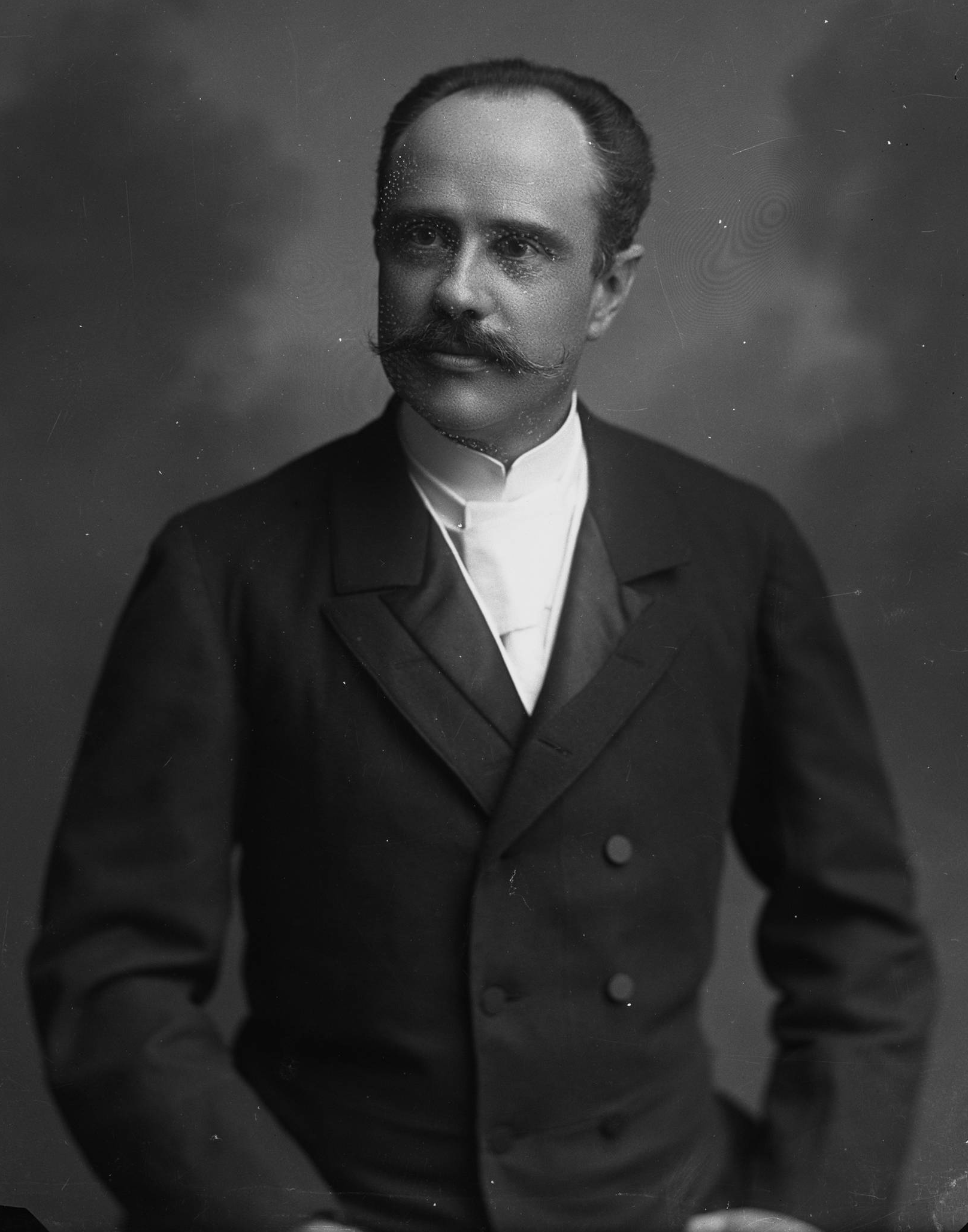

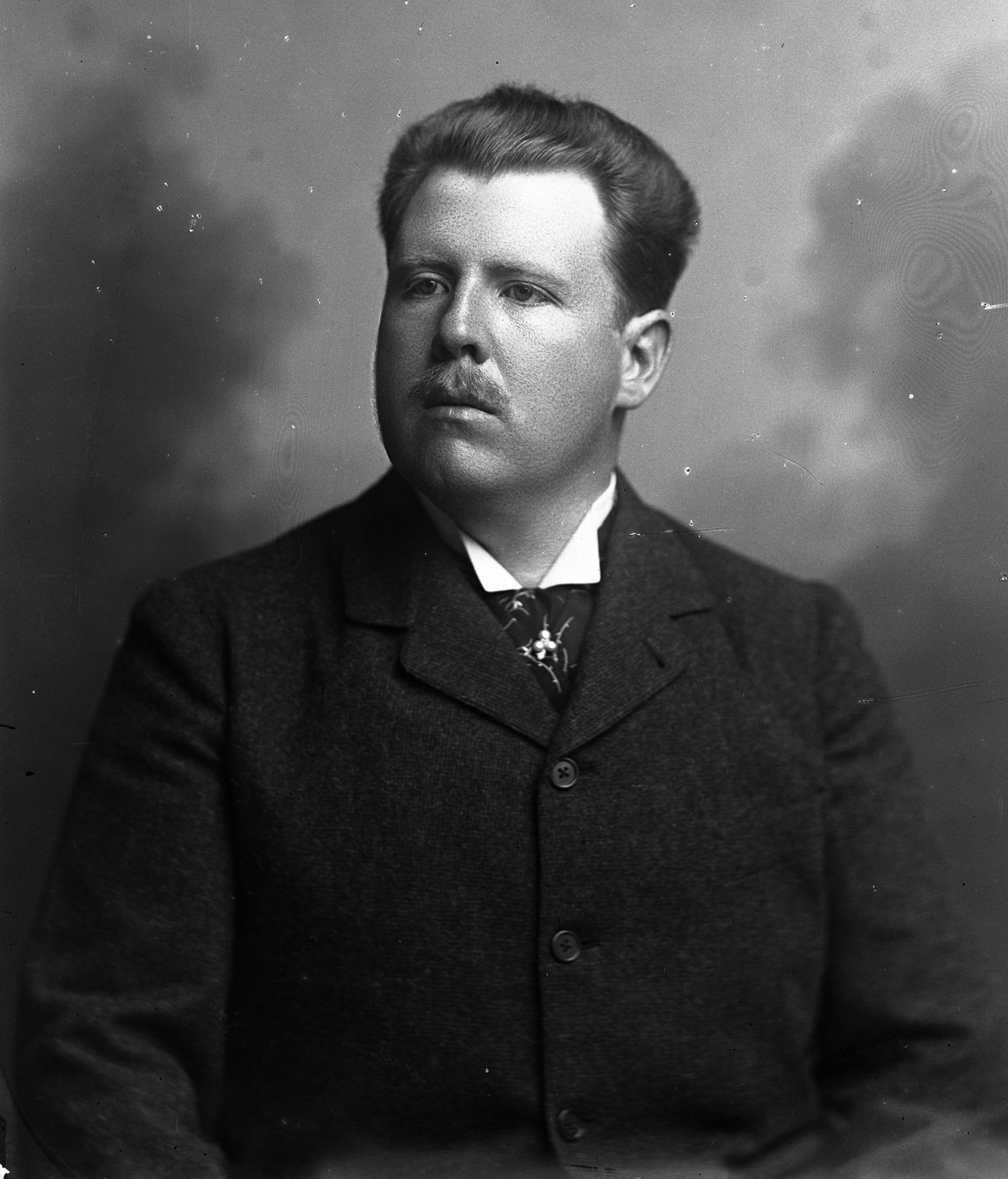
	First party	Second party
Leader	João Franco	José Luciano de Castro
Party	PRL	Progressive
Seats won	65	45
	Third party	Fourth party
Leader	Ernesto Hintze Ribeiro	José Maria de Alpoim
Party	Regenerator	DP
Seats won	24	4
Prime Minister before election
João Franco
PRL
Prime Minister after election
João Franco
PRL

Parliamentary elections were held in Portugal on 19 August 1906, the second that year and the fourth in three years. For the first time in several decades no party won an overall majority, with the Liberal Regenerator Party emerging as the largest party with 65 seats.

== Results ==
Party	Votes	%	Seats
Liberal Regenerator Party			65
Progressive Party			45
Regenerator Party			24
Progressive Dissidence			4
Portuguese Republican Party			4
Other parties and independents			6
Total			148
Total votes	489,778	–	
Registered voters/turnout	677,693	72.27	
Source: Nohlen & Stöver

The results exclude seats from overseas territories.
