= 1905 Portuguese legislative election =

- 12 December 1905

All seats in the Chamber of Deputies
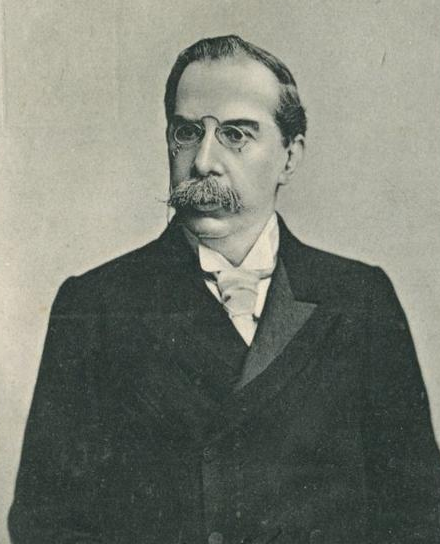

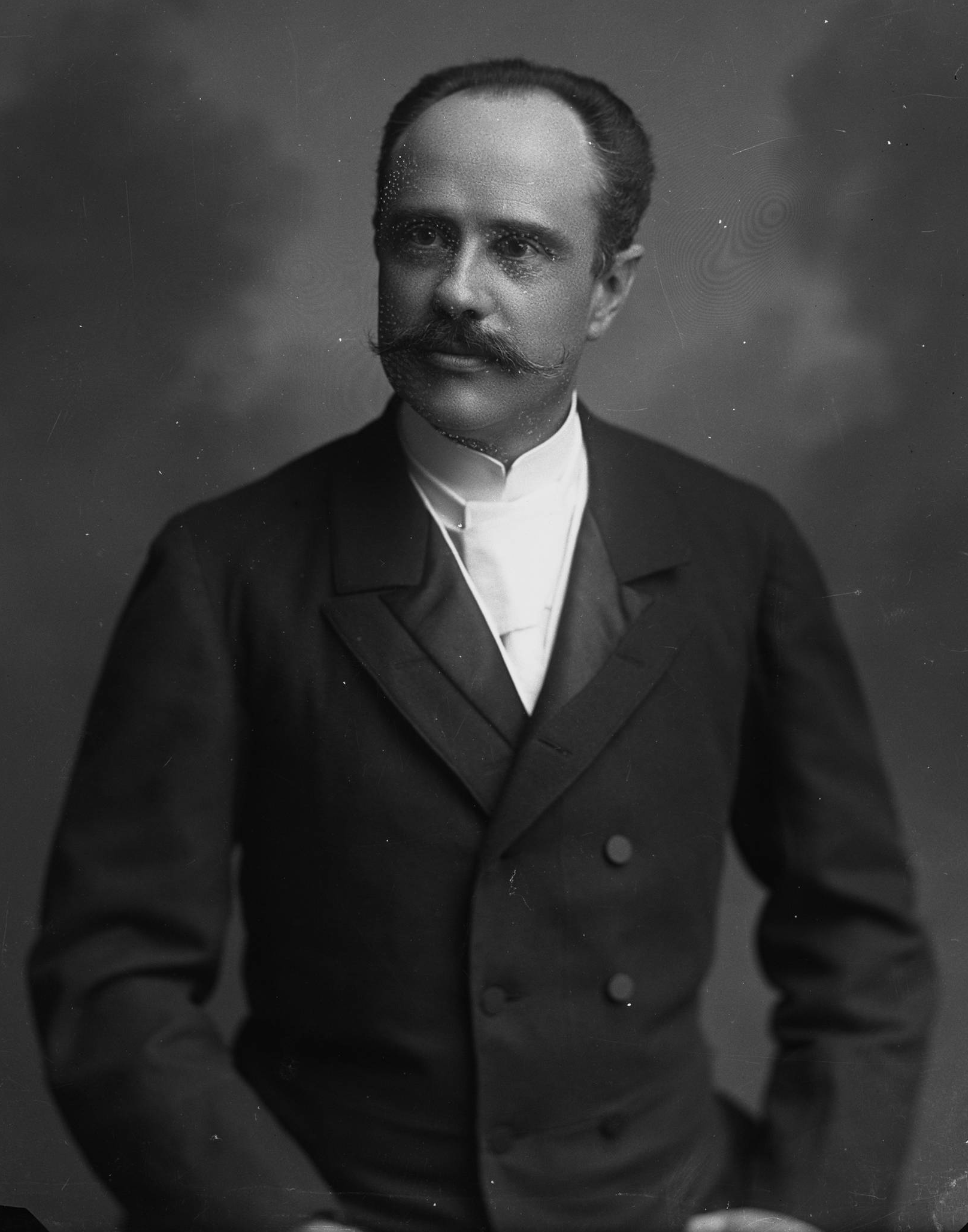

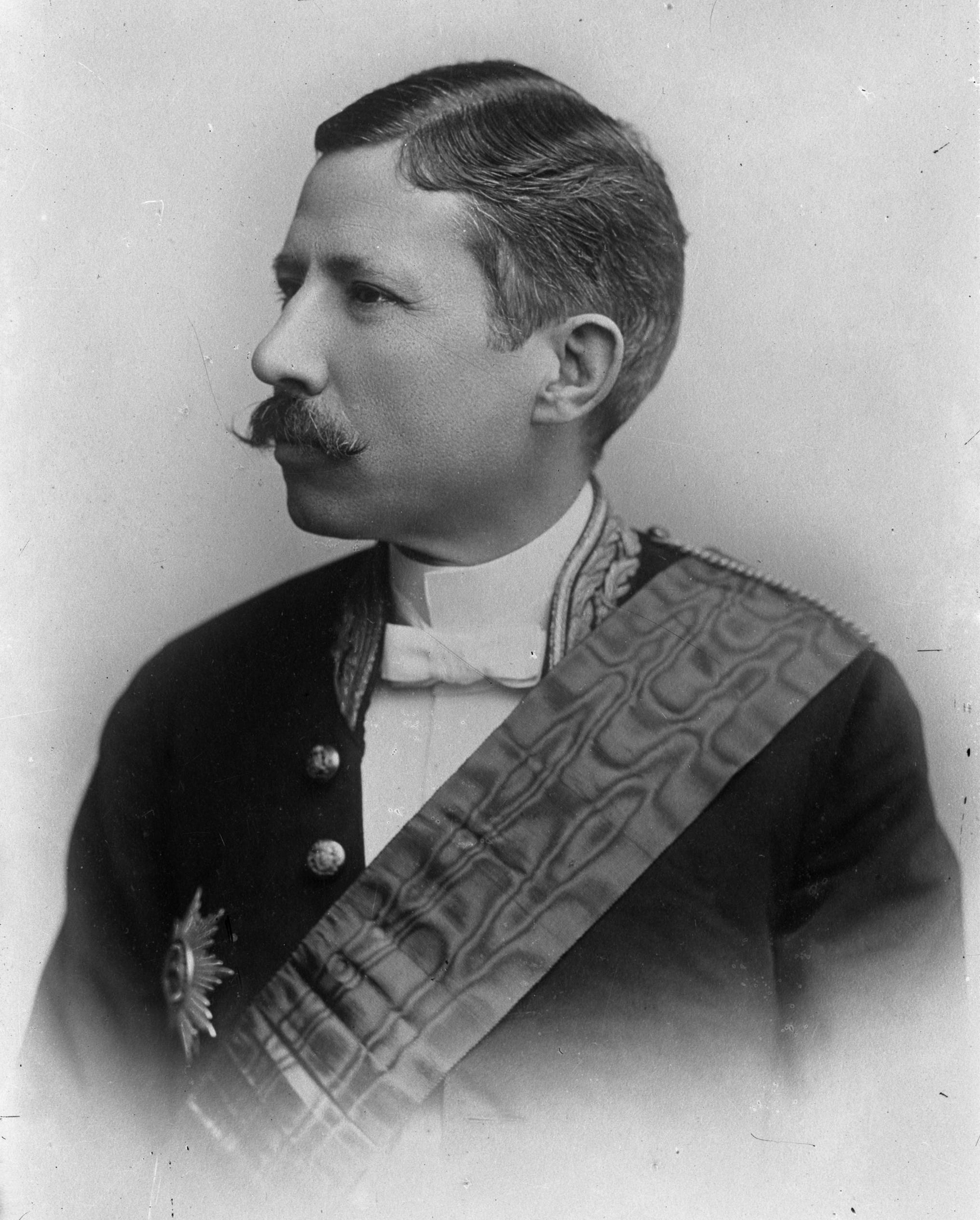
	First party	Second party	Third party
Leader	José Luciano de Castro	Ernesto Hintze Ribeiro	João Franco
Party	Progressive	Regenerator	PRL
Seats won	109	32	3
Prime Minister before election
José Luciano de Castro
Progressive
Prime Minister after election
José Luciano de Castro
Progressive

Parliamentary elections were held in Portugal on 12 December 1905. The result was a victory for the Progressive Party, which won 109 seats.

== Results ==
Party	Votes	%	Seats
Progressive Party			109
Regenerator Party			32
Liberal Regenerator Party			3
Other parties and independents			4
Total			148
Registered voters/turnout	679,926	–	
Source: Nohlen & Stöver

The results exclude seats from overseas territories.
