= 1908 Portuguese legislative election =

- 5 April 1908

All seats in the Chamber of Deputies
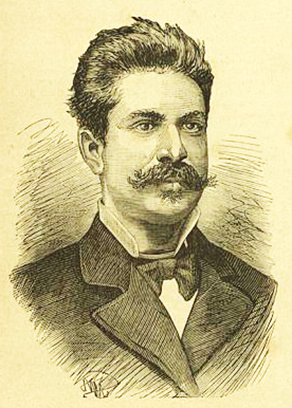

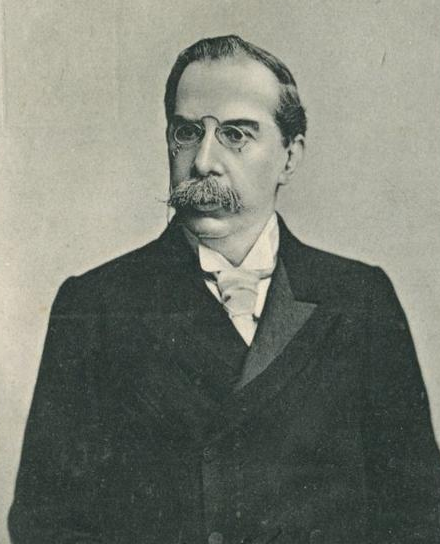

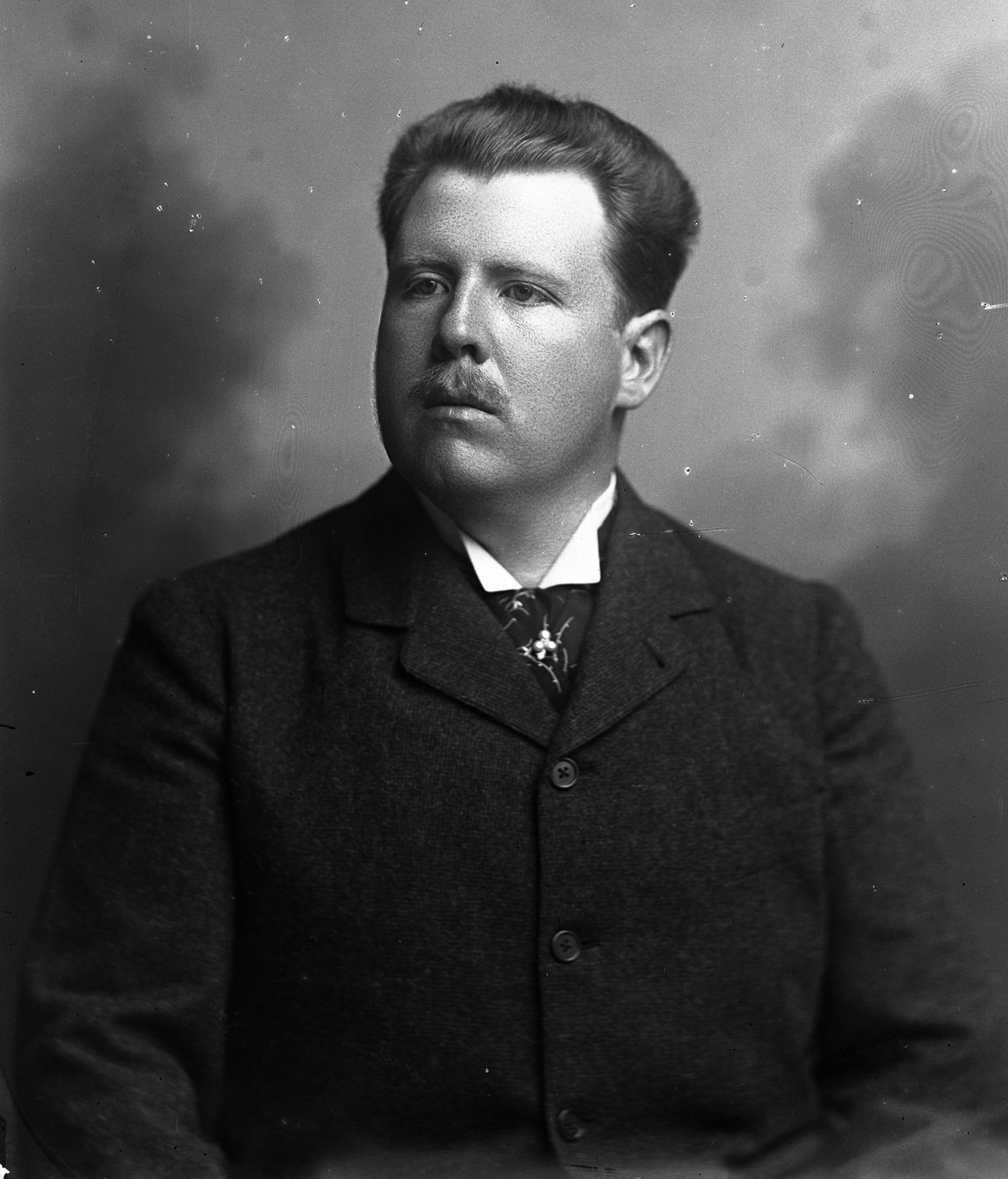

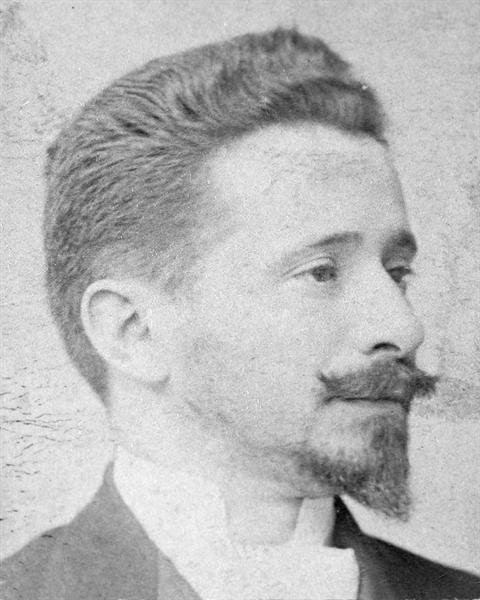
	First party	Second party
Leader	Júlio de Vilhena	José Luciano de Castro
Party	Regenerator	Progressive
Seats won	62	58
	Third party	Fourth party
Leader	José Maria de Alpoim	Afonso Costa
Party	DP	Republican
Seats won	7	7
Prime Minister before election
Ferreira do Amaral
Independent
Prime Minister after election
Ferreira do Amaral
Independent

Parliamentary elections were held in Portugal on 5 April 1908. The Regenerator Party emerged as the largest party in Parliament, winning 62 seats.

== Results ==
Party	Votes	%	Seats
Regenerator Party			62
Progressive Party			58
Progressive Dissidence			7
Portuguese Republican Party			7
Liberal Regenerator Party			3
Other parties and independents			11
Total			148
Total votes	450,199	–	
Registered voters/turnout	655,491	68.68	
Source: Nohlen & Stöver

The results exclude seats from overseas territories.
