= Manuel António Lino =

Portuguese physician, politician, poet and dramatist

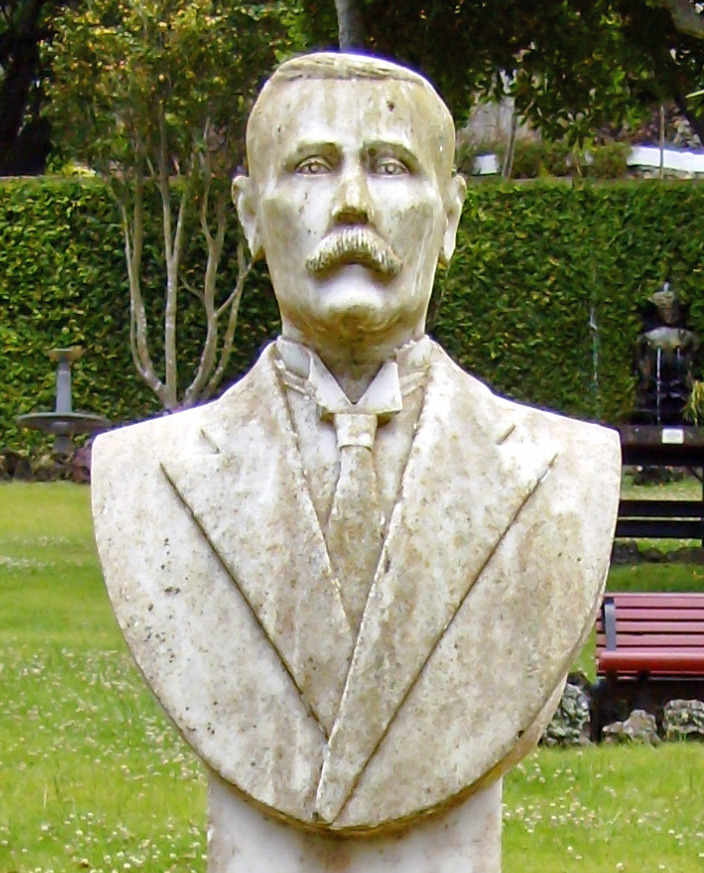

Civil Governor of the Horta District
- In office 6 June 1906 – September 1906
- Monarch: Carlos I of Portugal
- Prime Minister: João Franco
- Preceded by: Viscount José Bressane Leite Perry
- Succeeded by: Viscount José Bressane Leite Perry
- Constituency: District of Horta

Personal details
- Born: 4 January 1865 Angra do Heroísmo (Azores), Kingdom of Portugal
- Died: 15 June 1927 (aged 62) Angra do Heroísmo (Azores), Portugal
- Citizenship: Portuguese
- Party: Liberal Regenerator Party
- Relations: Manuel António Lino Sr. (father); Maria Laureana do Carmo Soares (mother)
- Education: University of Coimbra
- Occupation: Doctor (Ophthalmology) (1895-1900); Health Delegate (1900-1919); Chief Health Representative (1919-1926); Health Inspector (1926-1927)
- Profession: Medicine

Manuel António Lino (4 January 1865, in Angra do Heroísmo – 15 June 1927, in Angra do Heroísmo) was a physician, politician, poet and dramatist, who became Civil Governor of the District of Horta, Portugal in 1906.

== Early life ==
Manuel António Lino was born in the city of Angra, son of Manuel António Lino (Sr.) and Maria Laureana do Carmo Soares, both natives of the island of Pico.

== Career ==
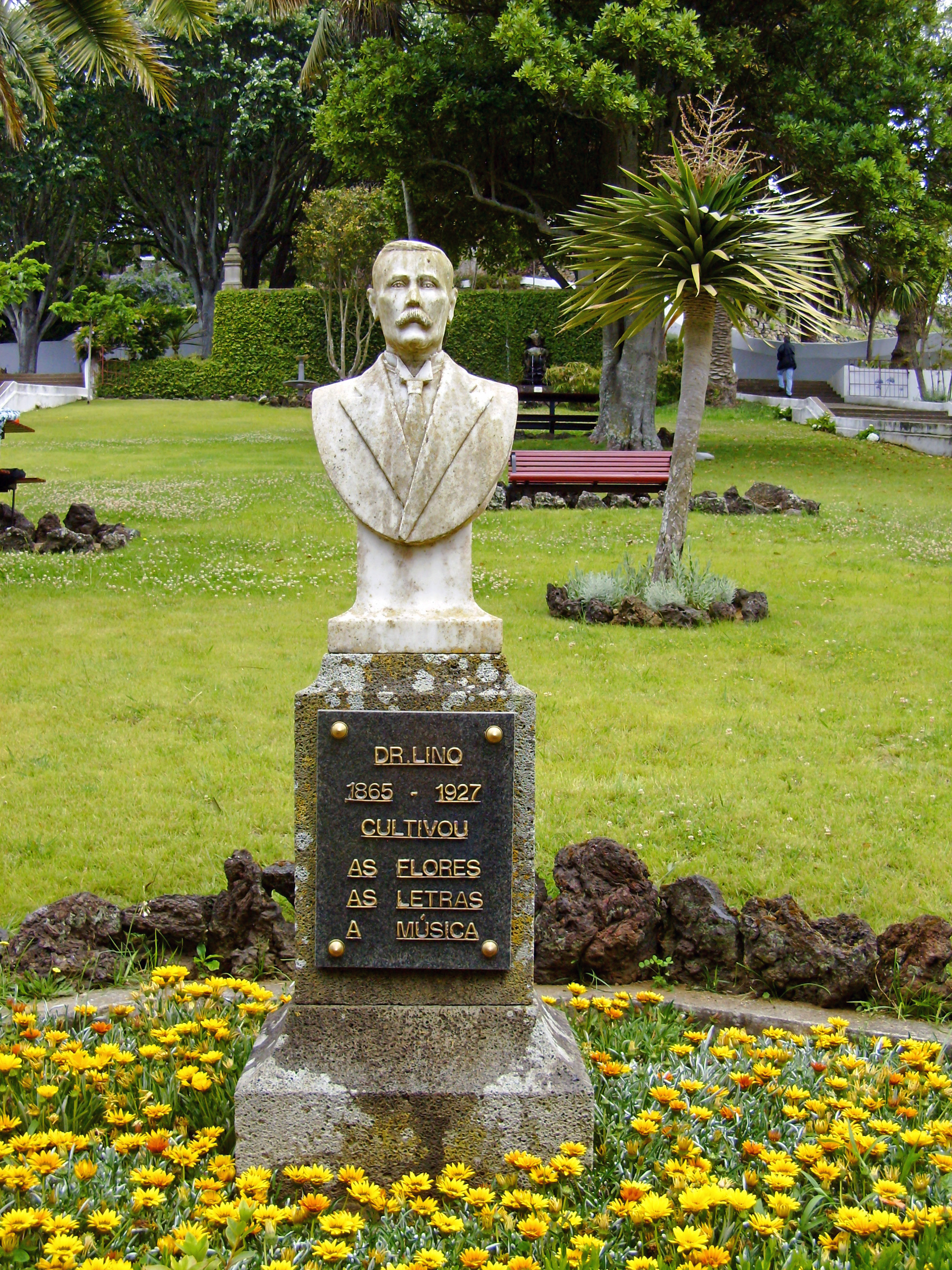
A bust of Dr. Manuel António Lino, in the Duke of Terceira Garden in Angra do Heroismo

In 1889, he was invited by the Junta Geral of Angra to participate in a foreign study on the setup and operation of disinfection posts. During this occasion he was in the city of Porto, where he was studying the spread of the bubonic plague.

A distinguished student, he completed his education in medicine at the University of Coimbra on 30 July 1892. He turned-down an invitation to teach in the faculty of Medicine in Coimbra, and returned to Terceira, where he opened his own general practice and ophthalmology specialization. A municipal doctor in Praia da Vitória (1895), and later Angra (1896–1900), he became a health delegate for the district of Angra (1900–1919), then chief health representative (1919–1926) and finally health inspector until 1927. At the same time, he provided classes in chemistry and natural sciences at the lyceum of Angra.

=== Civil governor ===
Manuel António Lino was one of the Francoist founders in the District of Angra, and belonged to the District Executive Commission of the Liberal Regenerator Party, organized in that city on 2 March 1904. It was this role that put him inline for the position in Horta.

The successor to the Progressive Dr. Francisco de Andrade Albuquerque, the Regenerator Viscount José Bressane Leite Perry for the second time, found himself invested in the position of Civil Governor which he had held for a short time. In fact, the rotative policy, with the support of the father, the powerful Dr. Emilio Antonio Severino de Avelar, had allowed him to helm the district on three occasions before the fall of the monarchy in Portugal. In addition, Perry had previously been a deputy in the Cortes and the local mayor. His second tenure (24 March to 17 May 1906) was short, and he was succeeded by the Liberal-Regenerators, since King Carlos, had accepted the resignation of Hintze Ribeiro. At that time the King had commissioned John Franco (on 19 May 1906), the leader of the rising Liberal-Regenerators to form the Government, which was supported by the Progressive elements of parliament.

As was typical during these changes, João Franco nominated Civil Governors who had his confidence. In the District of Horta, there were several elements constituting the core of the Liberal-Regenerators, figures that were part of the older parties of rotativism: Francisco Pereira Ribeiro Jr., Manuel Agostinho Fernandes da Fonseca and António Carvalho Alua haviam (who were traditional Regenerators), Florêncio José Terra Jr. and Manuel Emílio Tomás da Silveira (who were Progressive dissidents), and a group of independents, such as Alberto Silveira Leal, João Pereira Gabriel, José Augusto de Sequeira, José Inácio de Cristo, Henrique Garcia Monteiro, Joaquim Cardoso Ayres Pinheiro, José Augusto Coelho de Magalhães, Luís Gonzaga Rodrigues da Silva, Manuel Ávila Nunes, Manuel Machado da Conceição, António Silveira Bettencourt and Othon Pereira da Silva. These elites won the municipal elections on 17 June 1906, and presided by Ribeiro Jr. and Florêncio Terra as vice-president, they governed the municipality until August 1910. Someone from this group could have been selected as the Civil Governor, but João Franco selected the Terceirense medic Dr. Manuel António Lino who, curiously, only arrived before the municipal elections on the island of Faial.

He arrived on the Portuguese cruiser D. Carlos, and while on-board received the executive commissions of the Liberal-Regenerator and Progressive parties. The Telégrafo, writing on 6 June, continued:

[he] was conducted to land by the sandeel of the customhouse, which in times served for disembarking of the Royal Family, during their royal visit, accompanied by Dr. Nestor Xavier de Mesquita, Francisco Pereira Ribeiro Jr., Dr. Eduviges Goulart Prieto, Florêncio Terra, tenente Costa Salema, Francisco Pamplona Corte Real, Alberto Leal, Francisco Leal de Brito and Joaquim Rocha Bettencourt who were part of the executive commission of the Liberal Regenerator Party, as well as José Garcia do Amaral, administrator of the municipality Augusto Terra, João Machado da Conceição and Manuel Machado da Conceição.

He was politically installed that afternoon, in the "presence of numerous gentlemen of various political colours, personal friends, admirers and workers of that and other offices". At his ceremony the Secretary-General of the Civil Government, Dr. Eduviges Goulart Prieto congratulated Lino as the correct nomination. Florêncio Terra also spoke, and two days later, published a notable eulogy for Lino, who he considered intelligent, illustrious, modest and coy, noble of character and a valuable medic who, although young, had already provided incalculable services in public health, referring to his work on the bubonic plague in Porto and the rest of the country. Terra's op-ed served to justify the nomination. The A União of Angra, had little worries that Lino would be able to fulfill his duties, writing that his political naivety would serve him in bringing new thinking into a public administration. Other publications, like the O Tempo (also from Angra) noted that Lino would fall inline to repeated insistences of João Franco, to whom he owed his position. At the same time, it considered Lino him a sincere person to which party politics could not taint.

Arriving just before the municipal elections, expressly won by the Franco faction, Lino quickly began visiting the principal localities of the four islands. He preoccupied himself with the needs and aspirations of each of the respective populations and, also important, prepared the way for the general election in August 1906 (in which the Liberal-Regenerators and Progressives won). In all his travels within the district he was dependent on the cooperation and accompanied by the principal Franco representatives, especially Francisco Pereira Ribeiro Jr. and Florêncio Terra (who was also the president and vice-president of the municipal council of Horta, respectively) and the administrator for the municipality João Machado da Conceição. Notwithstanding his short mandate, he visited the civil parishes of Faial, the islands of Pico, Flores and Corvo (four times), always greeted by festive receptions. He was also in front of popular support, responsible for the domestic supply of water and electricity to the city, even as his role was short.

Lino's tenure was cut short in September 1906, three months after his investiture, the result of snares by the "Progressive clique" or local political intrigue, the incompatibility of his character with local politics, his enormous dedication to his family or to the Faialense of the island headquarters. It is unclear.

== Later life ==
He dedicated that latter part of his life to horticulture, poetry, painting, music and theatre, writing various operettas and comedies, as well as translating foreign pieces of drama into Portuguese.

He died in his native land. The municipal council of Angra do Heroísmo decided to honour him by installing, on 16 October 1949, a marble bust in the Duke of Terceira Garden. On the platform were dedications that read: "DR. LINO/ 1865-1927 /Cultivou / As Flores/ As Letras / A Música" Dr. Lino, 1865-1927, [He] cultivated the flowers, the letters and music".
