= Manuel Pinto =

Manuel Pinto may refer to:

- Manuel Guillermo Pinto (1783-1853), Argentine general and lawmaker
- Manuel Vieira Pinto (1923–2020), Portuguese-born Prelate of the Catholic Church in Mozambique
- Manuel Pinto da Costa (born 1937), Santoméan politician who served as President
- Manuel Pinto (footballer) (born 1938), Portuguese footballer
- Manuel Pinto (Scouting) (1938-2008), Ugandan Chief Scout
