= Francisco Correia de Herédia, 1st Viscount of Ribeira Brava =

Portuguese politician

His Lordship The Viscount of Ribeira Brava
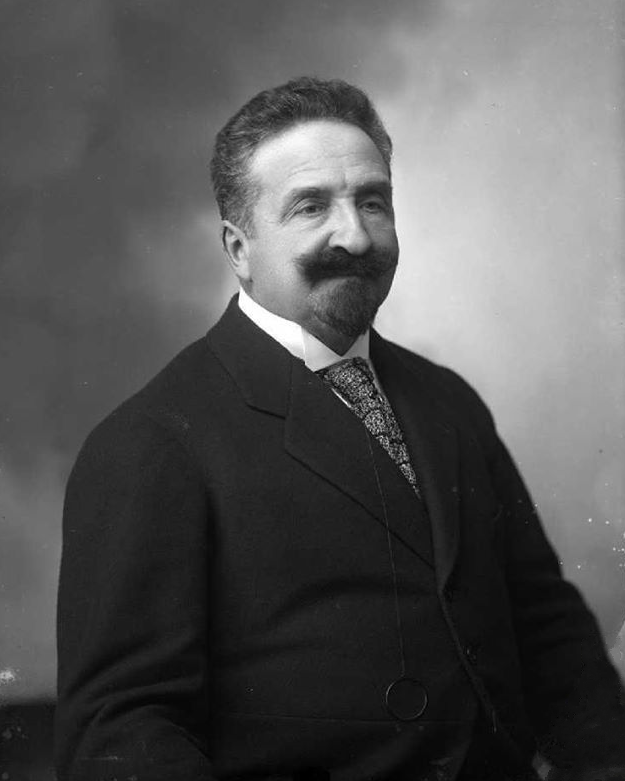

Personal details
- Born: Francisco Correia de Herédia Júnior; 2 April 1852 Ribeira Brava, Madeira, Portugal
- Died: 16 October 1918 (aged 66) Lisbon, Portugal
- Resting place: Prazeres Cemetery
- Party: Democratic Party (1912–1918); Portuguese Republican Party (1908–1912); Progressive Dissidence (1905–1908); Progressive Party (1890s); Regenerator Party (1880s)
- Spouse: Joana Gil de Borja de Macedo e Menezes (m. 1871)
- Education: Higher School of Letters

Dom Francisco Correia de Herédia Júnior, 1st Viscount of Ribeira Brava (Note: Surname also spelt as Corrêa de Herédia, particularly during his lifetime.) (2 April 1852 – 16 October 1918) was a Portuguese politician and landowner.

The political career of the Viscount of Ribeira Brava was very eventful and reflects the instability that characterised Portuguese politics at the end of the 19th century; he occupied several public offices, including that of member of parliament, mayor, and civil governor of the districts of Beja, Bragança and Lisbon. Initially aligned with the conservative-leaning Regenerator Party, he grew increasingly disenchanted with the Constitutional Monarchy, and ended up playing an important role in the events that revolutionised the political scene of the time: joining José Maria de Alpoim's Progressive Dissidence and later the Portuguese Republican Party, actively conspiring in the Municipal Library Elevator Coup and the Lisbon Regicide, and participating in the Republican Revolution in 1910. He remained politically active during the First Portuguese Republic, within the dominant Democratic Party, but was persecuted by the Sidonist government following the December 1917 coup d'état: he was killed in suspicious circumstances during a shootout in Lisbon, while being transferred to another prison along with other political prisoners.

He married D. Joana Gil de Borja de Macedo e Menezes (1851–1925), a wealthy heiress from the Alentejo, in 1871, with issue. The Viscount of Ribeira Brava is the great-great-grandfather in the male line of Isabel de Herédia, married to Duarte Pio, Duke of Braganza, the current pretender to the defunct Portuguese throne.
