= Mesão Frio =

- Municipality
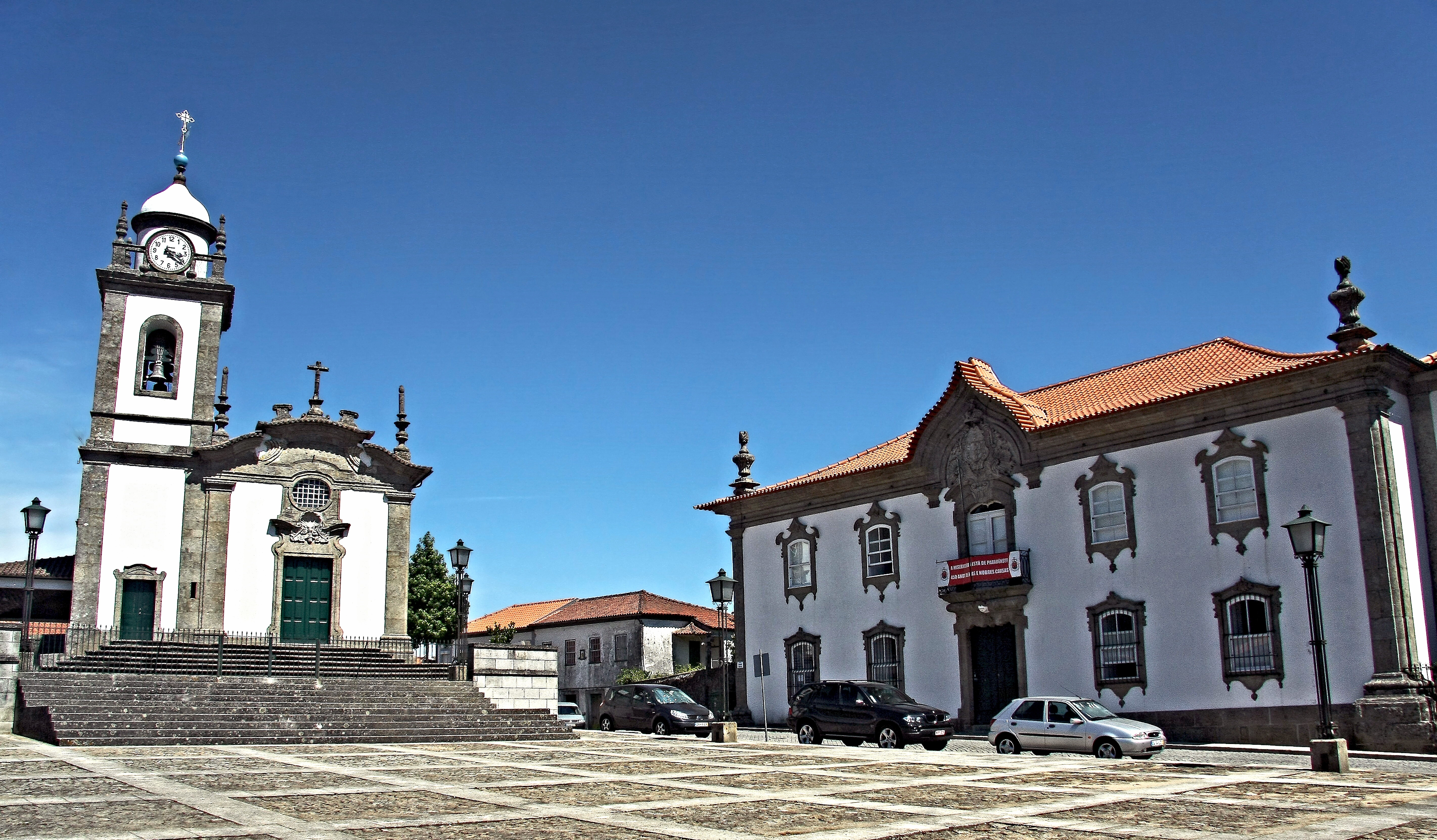

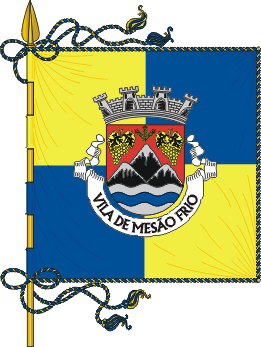
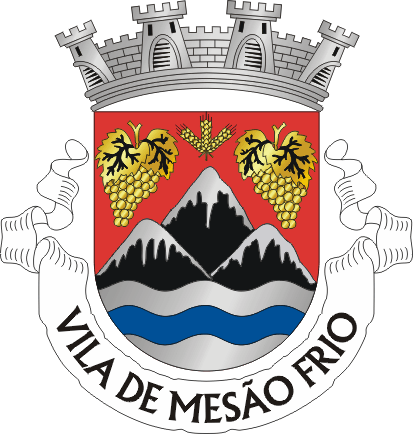
- Flag Coat of arms
- Interactive map of Mesão Frio
- Location in Portugal
- Coordinates: 41°9′26″N 7°53′35″W
- Country: Portugal
- Region: Norte
- Intermunic. comm.: Douro
- District: Vila Real
- Parishes: 5

Government
  - President: Alberto Monteiro Pereira (PS)

Area
  - Total: 26.65 km^{2} (10.29 sq mi)
- Elevation: 78 m (256 ft)
- Highest elevation: 1,025 m (3,363 ft)
- Lowest elevation: 50 m (160 ft)

Population (2011)
  - Total: 4,433
  - Density: 166.3/km^{2} (430.8/sq mi)
- Time zone: UTC+00:00 (WET)
  - Summer (DST): UTC+01:00 (WEST)
- Postal code: 5040
- Area code: 254
- Website: http://www.cm-mesaofrio.pt

Mesão Frio (Portuguese pronunciation: [mɨˈzɐ̃w ˈfɾi.u]) is a municipality in the district of Vila Real in Portugal. The population in 2011 was 4,433, in an area of 26.65 km^{2}.

== History ==
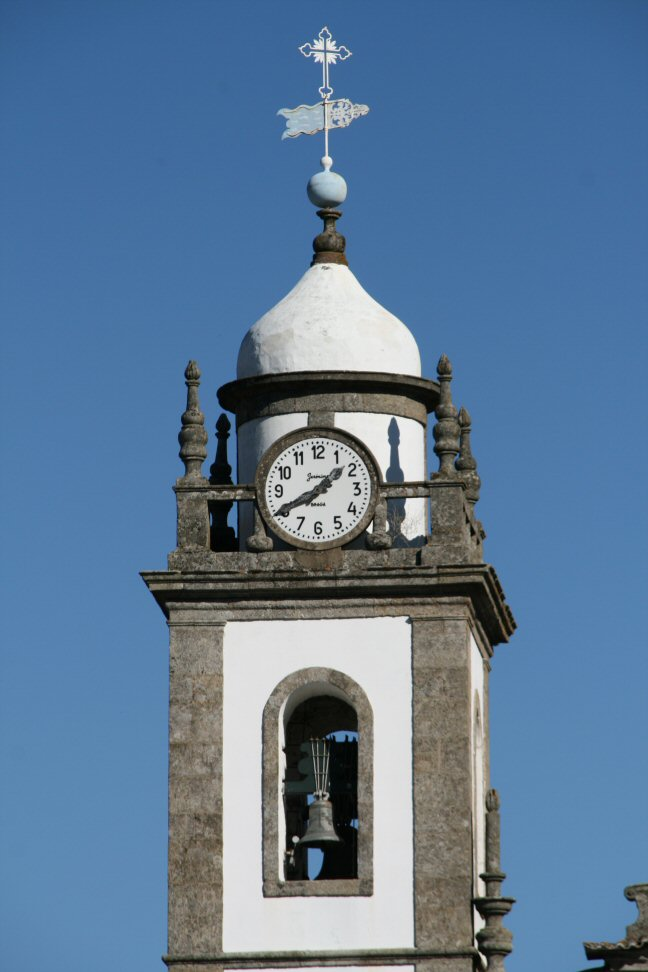
The clock/bell tower of the medieval Church of São Nicolau

The occupation of the territory of Mesão Frio dates back to the Romans, who occupied a castro in the area around Cidadelhe (from excavations encountered in this location).

The early nucleus of the modern Mesão Frio was founded near the Church of São Nicolau, which was erected on the instruction of Queen Maud of Savoy, Afonso Henriques' wife.

Mesão Frio was an early shelter on the Roman roadway; it was initially a respect, successively serving travellers, stabling horses and providing fresh animals, the settlement itself evolving approximately in the 3rd century, from the Latin “mansionis frigidae”.

Even before the establishment of a Kingdom of Portugal, the territory was occupied by Subei, Visigoths and Arabs, and for a time were the lands of Penaguião, extending between the Douro and Corgo Rivers, the sierra of Marão and the lands of Panóias (Vila Real). The first medieval references to Mesão Frio appeared in the correspondence of Henrique, Count of Portugal, where it was called “Meijon-Frio”. Its name evolved over centuries with the Portuguese language taking on variations that included: Meijon Frio, Meijó Frio, Mey Johan Frio, Meyon Frio, Meyão Frio and Mezam Frio, until reaching its current variation.

At one time, there was a legend that the toponymy was attributed to Esteves Gracia Monzon Friwn, who in 942 (during the reign of Ramiro II of León) entered along the Douro River with French knights whom took lands and rechristened them. This origin story was supported by the existence of six tombs within the Church of São Nicolau. The funerary monument was sculpted with the coat of arms of French knights, at a time when French knights crossed the territory during the Reconquista (718-1492).

The first foral was allocated by Afonso Henriques in February 1152, and later confirmed by Afonso II on 15 October 1217, while the King was Trancoso. Three days before St. Andrew's Day in 1513, King Manuel I of Portugal renovated the foral (a copy of which is located in the municipal archive).

At one time, this place was the residence for masons who constructed the bridge erected in Barqueiros (by Queen Maud whose husband had left 3000 Maravedi in his testament for the same).

During this medieval period, the settlement was actually divided in two, each with its own master mason, judge and officials (this division actually physically existed until about 1948). Mesão Frio, during the reign of Manuel I, already included the settlements of Cidadelhe and Vila Marim, in addition to the original parishes of São Nicolau and Santa Cristina, as well as a parcel of the Vila Jusã that included the village called Meigõ frio de Jusão, alongside the ecclesiastical parish of Meigõ Frio de Susão. The settlements of Barqueiros, Oliveira and Vila Jusã were annexed much later; Barqueiros, a municipality at the time, and the colonies of Oliveira and Vila Jusã, which belonged to Penaguião, were joined to the municipality of Mesão Frio on 6 November 1836.

With the export of wine during the 17th and 18th century, vineyards began to extend along the Douro River valley bringing a mature level of economic growth. But, the temptation of easy money caused many producers to alter the quality of Douro wines, resulting in poorer quality wines, and a fall in exports. In order to remedy this situation the Marquess of Pombal created the "Zona de Produção de Vinhos Generosos do Douro" to designate the region as a producer of elevated quality wines, and eliminate poorer quality producers.

Troops of French General Loison were responsible for fires and destruction in the region in 1808.

== Geography ==
=== Physical geography ===
Mesão Frio, is located 85 kilometres from Porto, 39 kilometres from Vila Real (the district capital) and 12 kilometres from Peso da Régua (its closest neighbour). It is limited in the north and east by the municipality of Peso da Régua, south by Resende and Lamego (along their Douro River frontier) and in the west by the municipality of Baião, in the district of Porto.

From the “Estudos de Caracterização do Território Municipal do PDM”, the municipality is identified by three geological areas: one associated with the Douro region, another that includes the sierra of Marão and farther east, an area of granite that extends to the west of the municipality. The ancient deposition of sedimentary layers that were later transformed resulting in a dominant formation of pre-Cambrian and Cambrian sediments. It was these structures that developed into the metamorphic rocks of the Douro Group, consisting of schists and greywackes. The schists, which include layers of faulted rocks (formations created during the Ordovician-Silurian periods) consist of an inferior layer of conglomerate Ordovician sediments of schists and metamorphic greywackes, as well as a layer of quartzite and schists with magnetic layering.

In the area of Barqueiros, there are derivative metamorphic rocks (clays, chiastolitic and interspersed schists) which resulted from granitic intrusions in the past. These granites pertain to the larger granitic region, consisting of granite or silicate cliffs with crystals of feldspar of a medium to fine quality. Sedimentary formations, refer to primarily the modern deposits along the margins of the Douro, creating terraces, sands and other alluvial deposits.

The region is bisected by a fault that cuts the municipality along a northwest by southeast alignment, in addition to a direction north-northeast by south-southeast.

The regions relief is primarily motivated by the Serra do Marão which is subdivided by the Douro River valley, forming linear hilltops where many of the principal settlements exist. Many of the watersheds are drained by tributaries of the Douro that have, although a low intensity flow, carved out deep valleys (such as the Teixeira and Semenha River). Monte de São Silvestre, in the parish of Vila Jusã, is the highest point in the municipality (located at 531 metres above sea level), while the lowest point is in the Porto de Rei, in Barqueiros (50 metre above the river).

=== Climate ===
Located in the southern flank of the Serra do Marão and on the right margin of the Douro, the region is marked by distinct climatic regions. The northern zone, owing to the mountainous Serra do Marão, has a climate characteristic of the Terras Frias Transmontanas (Trás-os-Montes Cold Lands): temperatures are relatively low (annual means between 10 °C and 12.5 °C) and exposed to colder winds and precipitation (annually in excess of 1600 millimetres). The southeastern zone, with minor humidity and reduced altitudes, has less precipitation. The localities here are between 400 and 700 metres in altitude (such as Vila Marim and Brunhais), and although the winters continue to be cold, they are less sevre, and the summers are shorter and warmer (with temperatures between 12.5 °C and 14 °C). In the valleys of the Douro, Teixeira and Sermenha (areas of 400 metres and less in altitude) the temperatures and climate are almost Mediterranean. These areas have annual temperatures of 14 °C and area commonly referred to as part of the Terras Quentes Transmontanas (Trás-os-Montes Warm Lands).

=== Human geography ===
The evolution of the resident population of Mesão Frio has diminished recent years; between 1991 and 2001, the population in the municipality decreased from 5519 to 4926. Similar decreases occurred between the period 1960 and 2001 where the resident population dropped by 2498 inhabitants. The only exception occurring after the return of colonial immigrants and military after the independence of many of the Portuguese Colonial dependencies.

Although the primary level of government is the municipal authority, the local administration is operated by civil parish boards (Portuguese: juntas de freguesias). The municipality is divided into 5 civil parishes (freguesias):

- Barqueiros
- Cidadelhe
- Oliveira
- Mesão Frio (Santo André)
- Vila Marim

== Notable citizens ==
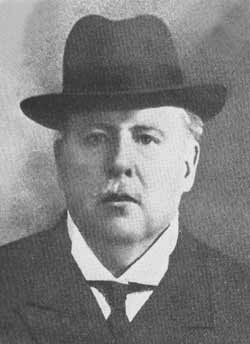
José Maria Alpoim, one of the architects of the Republican revolution of 1910

- José Maria de Alpoim Cerqueira Borges Cabral (Santa Cristina; 2 June 1858 - Lisbon, 12 December 1916) was a politician, member of the Progressive Party of Portugal, and later the Republican Party of Portugal, who held various roles during the last years of the constitutional monarchy in Portugal, and was responsible for providing bombs, arms and money to republican conspirators involved in the Lisbon Regicide. Later, as well as holding positions in the Ministry of Justice after his exile in Salamanca, he held minor roles in the First Portuguese Republic. The public garden in Mesão Frio, along with an avenue that bears his name (Avenida Conselheiro José Maria Alpoim) and, in front of the municipal grounds, a bust of José Maria de Alpoim was erected in 1923.
