= Barqueiros =

- Civil parish
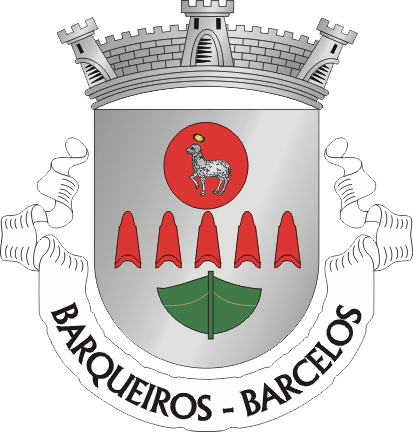
- Coat of arms

- Location in Portugal
- Coordinates: 41.481°N 8.717°W
- Country: Portugal
- Region: Norte
- Intermunic. comm.: Cávado
- District: Braga
- Municipality: Barcelos

Area
  - Total: 8.07 km^{2} (3.12 sq mi)

Population (2011)
  - Total: 1,957
  - Density: 243/km^{2} (628/sq mi)
- Time zone: UTC+00:00 (WET)
  - Summer (DST): UTC+01:00 (WEST)
- Website: www.barqueiros.pt

Barqueiros is a Portuguese freguesia ("civil parish"), located in the municipality of Barcelos. The population in 2011 was 1,957, in an area of 8.07 km^{2} (3.12 sq mi). Barqueiros has an annual festival known as Festa da Senhora das Necessidades, which is considered one of the most impressive festivals of the province of Minho, held annually on September 6, 7 and 8.

Barqueiros became daily news in Portugal in the 1980s due to mass protests by the citizens of Barqueiros against the mining of Kaolin. This became known in Portugal as the Guerra dos Caulinos. The conflict dragged on through the 1980s until it finally escalated resulting in the shooting death of 20-year-old José Carlos Manhente Simões on June 26, 1989 by GNR forces (Guarda Nacional Republicana).
