= Pinter (surname) =

Pinter is a Hungarian occupational surname meaning "cooper". Notable people with the surname include:

- Ádám Pintér (born 1988), Hungarian football player
- Anina Pinter, Los Angeles-based costume designer
- Attila Pintér (footballer born 1966), Hungarian football player and coach
- Attila Pintér (footballer born 1978), Hungarian football player
- Avrohom Pinter (1949–2020), British Haredi rabbi
- Colleen Zenk Pinter (born 1953), American actress
- Csaba Pintér (born 1967), bass player of Hungarian band Pokolgép
- Danny Pinter (born 1996), American football player
- Ferenc Pinter (1931–2008), Italian painter and illustrator
- Frances Pinter (born 1950), British publisher
- Friedrich Pinter (born 1978), Austrian biathlete
- Harold Pinter (1930–2008), British playwright
- Hilda Pinter (born 1932), Hungarian canoer
- István Pintér (1831–1875), Hungarian Slovene writer
- János Pintér (born 1936), Hungarian long-distance runner
- Jason Pinter (born 1979), American author
- József Pintér (born 1953), Hungarian chess Grandmaster
- Jürgen Pinter (born 1979), Austrian skier
- László Ernő Pintér (born 1942), Hungarian priest and malacologist
- László Pintér (politician) (born 1950), Hungarian politician
- Mark Pinter (born 1950), American actor
- Michal Pintér (born 1994), Slovak football player
- Robert B. Pinter (1937–2001), American biomedical engineer
- Sándor Pintér (born 1948), Hungarian politician
- Sándor Pintér (footballer) (born 1950), Hungarian football midfielder
- Tomislav Pinter (1926–2008), Croatian cinematographer
- Zoltán Pintér (born 1977), Hungarian football player

== See also ==
- Cooper (surname)
