= José Maria de Alpoim =

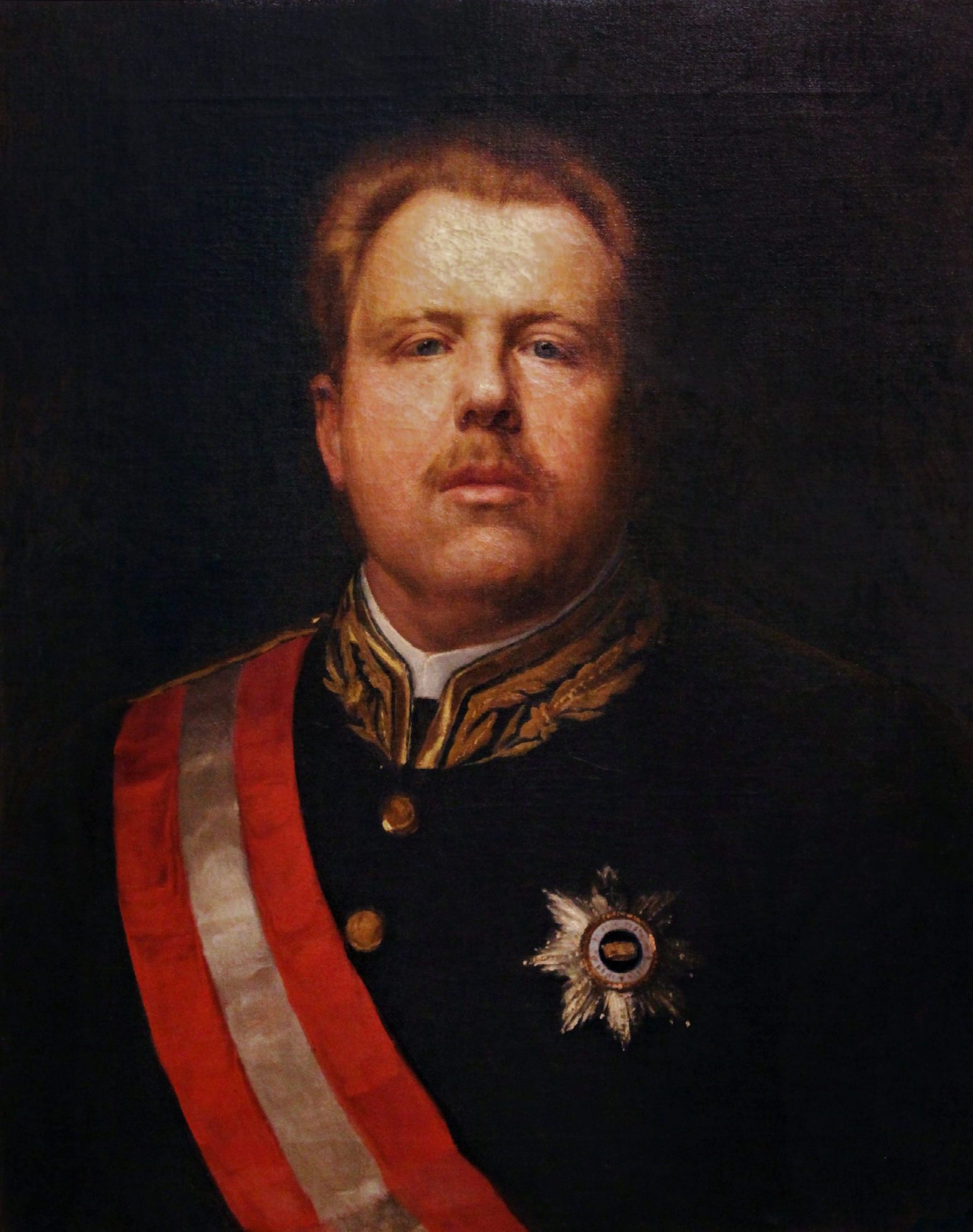

Minister of Ecclesiastical Affairs and Justice
- In office 20 October 1904 – 10 May 1905
- Monarch: Carlos I
- Prime Minister: José Luciano de Castro
- Preceded by: Artur de Campos Henriques
- Succeeded by: Artur Montenegro
- In office 18 August 1898 – 26 June 1900
- Monarchs: Luís I Carlos I
- Prime Minister: José Luciano de Castro
- Preceded by: Francisco da Veiga Beirão
- Succeeded by: Artur de Campos Henriques

Personal details
- Born: José Maria de Alpoim Cerqueira Borges Cabral; 2 June 1858 Santa Cristina, Mesão Frio
- Died: 15 December 1916 (58 years old) Lisbon
- Resting place: Lisbon
- Party: Progressive Party; Progressive Dissidence
- Spouse: Carmo de Tovar Pereira Coutinho de Vilhena e Menezes,
- Children: Bernardo de Alpoim; Egas de Alpoim
- Education: University of Coimbra
- Occupation: Politician
- Profession: Journalist

José Maria de Alpoim Cerqueira Borges Cabral (Santa Cristina, Mesão Frio, 2 June 1858 - Lisbon, 15 December 1916) was a politician, member of the Progressive Party of Portugal, and later the Republican Party of Portugal, who held various roles during the last years of the constitutional monarchy in Portugal. He was a deputy in the Cortes, Counsel and Peer of the Realm, as well as holding positions in the Ministry of Justice, as well as roles in the First Portuguese Republic.

== Biography ==
José Maria de Alpoim was born in the Solar da Rede, Santa Cristina, Mesão Frio, son of Francisco Borges Cerqueira de Alpoim Cabral (educated in Law) from a Royal House and Master of the Casa da Rede, and his wife, Amância Dulce Samora de Quevedo e Alpoim.

In 1878, at the age of 20, he graduated from the Faculty of Law at the University of Coimbra, taking on positions in the administration of the local government of Mesão Frio and Lamego: he was the youngest administrator in the municipality, at the time.

=== Party politics ===
Member of the Progressive Party (Portuguese: Partido Progressista) since 1879, he was the protégée of Mariano Cirilo de Carvalho, he worked closely with José Luciano de Castro and regularly debated Francisco António da Veiga Beirão within the party on its direction. He was one of the more controversial members of the Partido Progressista, alongside Moreira de Almeida, António Centeno, Queirós Ribeiro and Francisco Correia de Herédia, 1st Viscount of Ribeira Brava.

Deputy, counsel and peer-of-the-realm, he was Ministro dos Negócios Eclesiásticos (English: Minister of Ecclesiastical Affairs) and Ministro da Justiça (English: Minister of Justice) in two governments led by José Luciano de Castro (from August 18, 1898 to June 26, 1900 and later October 20, 1904 to May 11, 1905). During his second term at the Ministry of Justice, he developed a notable reformist program that included revisions to the Bankruptcy Code, policies on judicial assistance and reforms to medical-legal services. As a legislative deputy, he openly attacked measures that the Minister of Finance, Manuel Afonso de Espregueira, had developed for resolving the dispute that developed on the tobacco monopoly. This conflict was to be the catalyst for him immediately leaving the government. His departure from the government was one of the reasons for the disintegration of the Partido Progressista; accompanied by other important and/or prestigious figures he formed a new faction, Progressive Dissidence, with principles that were soon closely allied to the republican cause.

=== Pseudo-monarchist ===
As leader of a small political party, Alpoim soon realized that the only way to take power, and/or change the system, came from taking it by force. Alpoim was monarchist with poor conviction, and observed attentively the activities of the republicans in the press, commissions and made it clear his political alignments. This opinion developed over time, from his early engagement in the Progressive Party, and later as leader of Progressive Dissidence, where he realized that rotational system of government could not resolve the problems in the society. Many of his critiques and disenchantments came from his opinions of the monarchy, and in particular King Carlos I of Portugal; in comparison to most republicans, who attacked King Carlos I as a symbol of the political institution, José Maria de Alpoim, above all, despised profoundly the personage of King Carlos as well as the institution:

"What I wouldn't give for a revolution!...To put the King in his place...I have nothing to lose, my sons are taken care of, what I have would allow me to live in Régua as a nobleman...What is needed is that the King should fear...Now with the English alliance it is worse. Even the other day José Luciano said 'The Republicans could come here in group, those from here and those from Spain, they would not do anything.' It is the alliance that, if any movement should exist, will disembark troops and defend the King."

Later, Miguel Sanches de Baêna, in Raul Brandão's Memórias, referred to Alpoim's:

"...furor against the monarchist institutions and against the King did not appear to have limits."

Rocha Martins, in D. Carlos, mentioned a story about Alpoim, who upon entering the typography offices at the newspaper O Dia, where he was director, made his way to the typographer Teixeira Severino and asked him: "Do you think that D. Carlos show be killed?" He then recounted how Alpoim had begun to whistle.

During an interview in the Parisian daily Le Temps (in November 1907) he indicated his confidence in the prime minister João Franco; he eulogized his intelligence and unique character even at a time when the Prime Minister had created enemies in the monarchist movement by establishing an administrative dictatorship. The republicans knew how to seize on Alpoim's passions, his desire for power and of those who gravitated in Alpoim's circle; by May 1907 José Maria de Alpoim had become an enemy of the monarchist movement, was ready to install a republic and had convinced even his monarchist friend the Francisco Correia de Herédia, 1st Viscount of Ribeira Brava to join him in the plot. Accompanied by the Viscount of Ribeira Brava, he held meetings with Afonso Costa, then leader of the Partido Republicano (English: Republican Party). By June, he had met with João Chagas and, later, at his home he hosted a small group of disenchanted politicians and dissidents that included Rui Ramos, the republicans Afonso Costa and Alexandre Braga, a couple of military officers, the Viscount of Ribeira Brava and physician Egas Moniz (who would eventually win the Nobel Prize), as well as a few Regenerator politicians.

Later, Raul Brandão, affirmed that José de Alpoim had provided the bombs, arms and money to republican conspirators (something that Alpoim would later admit publicly). João Chagas, who would become Prime Minister during the First Republic, noted:

"Alpoim was who provided the arms for the revolution....we had men, they gave us arms and a good many contos de réis."

During the attempted Municipal Library Elevator Coup on January 28, 1908, he took refuge at the home of the Regenerator politician António Teixeira de Sousa, before escaping into exile in Salamanca.

=== After the Republic ===
When the First Portuguese Republic was declared in 1910, he returned to Portugal, dissolved Progressive Dissidence, and joined the new regime. Alpoim moved from a position as the Attorney-General of the Crown to adjunct to the Attorney-General of the Republic, but was initially ostracized politically. He considered himself a professional revolutionary, at one time declaring "I want and desire power, for power's sake", but he ended his political life as the Republican government representative on the board of Companhia do Niassa. At this point, he was removed from the establishment and politics, although his friends would later note that politics was the only thing that really interested him.

In addition to his fluent oratory and spontaneity, he was a brilliant journalist for his time (his O Primeiro de Janeiro is notable); he was one of the founders of the Correio Português, he directed O Dia and collaborated on the Correio da Noite, Novidades, O Repórter and other newspapers.

== Later life ==
He married D. Maria do Carmo de Tovar Pereira Coutinho de Vilhena e Menezes, and raised two sons (Bernardo de Alpoim and Egas de Alpoim) who were notable officers in the Navy.

At a time when he was becoming a vocal critic of the participation of Portugal in World War I, he died in Lisbon on December 15, 1916. The public garden in Mesão Frio, along an avenue that bears his name (Avenida Conselheiro José Maria Alpoim) and in front of the municipal grounds, a bust of José Maria de Alpoim was erected in 1923.
