= Progressive Dissidence =

Progressive Dissidence (Portuguese: Dissidência Progressista, DP) was a political party in Portugal.

== History ==
The party was established in 1905 by Minister of Justice José Maria de Alpoim as a left-wing breakaway from the Progressive Party. It won nine seats in the April 1906 parliamentary elections, but was reduced to four seats in the August 1906 elections. The 1908 elections saw the party win seven seats.

The party was dissolved in 1910.
