= Manuel Pinto (Scouting) =

- Born: 25 December 1938
- Died: 14 April 2008 (aged 69); Nsambya, Uganda
- Occupation: Member of the Parliament of Uganda
- Known for: Government minister from 1993 to 1995

Manuel Pinto (25 December 1938 – 14 April 2008) was a member of the Parliament of Uganda where he served on various statutory committees and committees, he was a government minister from 1993 to 1995 and the first director general of the commission on AIDS in Uganda from 1992 to 1995. Pinto was Chief Scout of Uganda and served as the Chairman of the Africa Scout Committee.

== Background ==
He died in Nsambya after a car accident.

In 2003, Pinto was awarded the 297th Bronze Wolf, the only distinction of the World Organization of the Scout Movement, awarded by the World Scout Committee for exceptional services to world Scouting.
