= Liberal Regenerator Party =

Liberal Regenerator Party Portuguese: Partido Regenerador Liberal
- Abbreviation: PRL
- Leader: João Franco
- Founded: May 16, 1901
- Dissolved: 1910
- Split from: Regenerator Party
- Headquarters: Lisbon
- Ideology: Constitutional Monarchy; Liberal conservatism
- Political position: Centre-right
- Religion: Roman Catholicism
- Colors: Blue

The Liberal Regenerator Party (Portuguese: Partido Regenerador Liberal) was a Portuguese political party established in 1901, under the leadership of João Franco.
