= João Franco =

Portuguese politician and minister

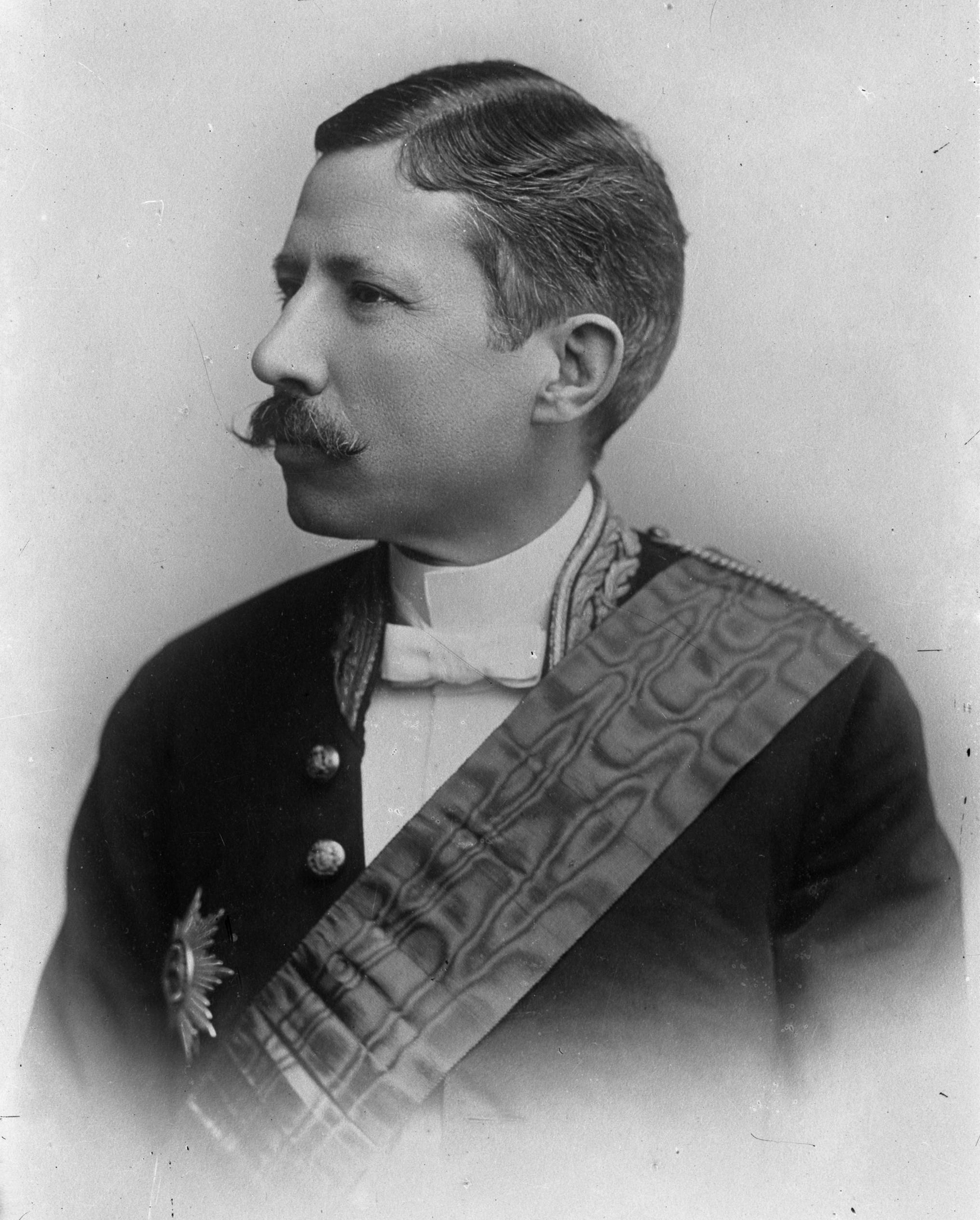
- Photograph, c. 1904

Prime Minister of Portugal
- In office 19 May 1906 – 4 February 1908
- Monarch: Carlos
- Preceded by: Ernesto Hintze Ribeiro
- Succeeded by: Francisco Ferreira do Amaral

Personal details
- Born: João Franco Ferreira Pinto Castelo-Branco; 14 February 1855 Fundão, Portugal
- Died: 4 April 1929 (aged 74) Anadia, Portugal
- Party: Liberal Regenerator

João Franco Ferreira Pinto Castelo-Branco, GCTE (Portuguese pronunciation: [ʒuˈɐ̃w ˈfɾɐ̃ku]; 14 February 1855 – 4 April 1929) was a Portuguese politician, minister, 43rd Minister for Treasury Affairs (14 January 1890) and 47th Prime Minister (19 May 1906 – 4 February 1908).

== Early life ==
He was the son of Frederico Carlos Ferreira Franco Freire (16 January 1829 – 1909), a nobleman of the Royal Household, and Luísa Henriqueta Pinto Correia da Costa Castelo-Branco (1835–1893).

== Career ==
He was educated at the University of Coimbra receiving a bachelor's degree in 1875. On entering an administrative career, he was able to prove himself in public competitions for several positions, including: delegate to the royal prosecutor in the comarcas of Sátão, Baião, Alcobaça and Lisbon (between January 1877 and January 1885); service chief of the general administration for customs-houses (from October 1885); administrator general for customs-houses (from February 1886 until December 1886); and court auditor for customs tax litigation (which began in 1886). From his post-University experience, it was obvious that Franco had a spirit and personal energy that would contribute to his partisan conflicts, and formed his role in Portuguese politics. Franco communicated and wrote well which, for the time, gave him advantages in public life, defined by debates and journalistic quarrels. He was rich, had good contacts, appreciated intrigue and immersed in commerce oriented toward service and merit, which united many of the liberal elite of the time.

He was elected for this first time in 1884, for the constituency of Guimarães, and only remained in this position until the Cortes contradicted the will of his electorate. Since the position of delegate and legislative deputy were incompatible, he opted to remain in the legislature, thereby losing his rights in the magistrates offices. Shortly after his election the conflict between Braga and Guimarães occurred, and he dedicated his efforts to support the residents of Guimarães, who had supported his election. The conflict lasted a year, and during that time he exhibited his judicial talents and charter as deputy for Guimarães, receiving sympathies from his electors. During the 1857 legislature, he was responsible for several speeches, covering political, administrative, economic and financial issues, that included issues such as the port of Lisbon, port of Leixões and customs. He regularly sparred with members of Progressive Party (Portuguese: Progressistas) between 1886 and 1890, and his name was associated with the first ministry (government) organized by the Regenerator Party.

=== Minister ===
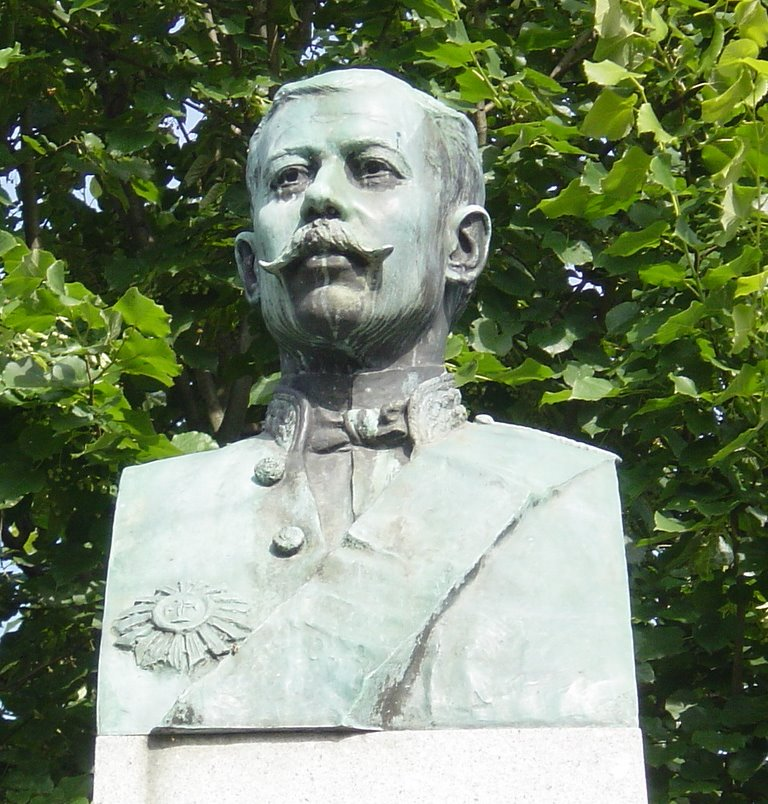
The bust of João Franco, located in a square of the same name in Guimarães, dedicated to the former Minister of the Kingdom

On 14 January 1890, he was called before the councils of the Crown, and given the Finance portfolio, during the government presided by António de Serpa Pimentel, which had replaced the Progressive cabinet of José Luciano de Castro. At the end of eight months, on 12 October 1890, Pimental's government fell, resulting in his publication of a celebrated report on the state of the nation's finances, that resulted in vivid discussions. In 1891, following the fall of the Progressive ministry, a cabinet presided by general João Crisóstomo de Abreu e Sousa and the Regenerators, once again, took office. At that time Franco was given the responsibility for Public Works (which he occupied from 21 May 1891 to 14 January 1892). It was from this period that many institutional, industrial and agricultural reforms were implemented under his watch, including various measures were promulgated to develop industry and the economy. Among these laws, was the presentation of a bill to create new industries, which was never adopted (due to the government falling) but were promulgated in 1892 by decree. Inclined towards protectionism, Franco aligned himself with other protectionists in 1892, collaborating with them and Finance Minister Oliveira Martins, during his role as president of the Finance committee. It was during his oversight that Beira Baixa rail-line was inaugurated, visited by King Carlos and Queen Amélia in their first public event as monarchs, in the provinces of the north. Since July 1891, until 16 November, Franco also occupied the post of Minister of Public Instruction and Fine Arts (Portuguese: Ministro da Instrução Pública e Belas artes).

The bust of João Franco, located in a square of the same name in Guimarães, honors the former Minister of the Kingdom, reflecting his historical significance and political influence in early 20th-century Portugal.

Between February 1893 and 1897 he managed the Kingdom's portfolio. At that time he reformed secondary school education, the administrative code (1896), electoral law, limiting the number of public service workers in the municipal councils, regulating pollution on the sea, laws against anarchists and the reduction of municipal districts and comaracas. These and other measures, as well as acts of force, such as the suppression of the Associações Comercial (Commercial Associations) and Associações dos Lojistas de Lisboa (Lisbon Tenants Association), as well as the order to expel the republican warlord Salmeron, provoked heated discussions and captivated the attentions of the country. Franco did not waver, and through them doubled his efforts to end class anarchy, which he believed were against public order.

In July 1900, during the new Regenerator government Franco did not obtain a ministry; at that time the political and personal relationship between Hintze Ribeiro, the party chief, and Franco, chairman of the cabinet, were not cordial. The press writing around this time indicated that a full rupture was inevitable, owing to the differences of opinion. A fissure developed during the 13 February 1901 session: João Franco made a speech on overseas tax policies, which did not please the government, and indicated his open opposition. On 14 May, deputy Malheiro Reimão strongly attacked the income tax policy, which was, the next day, also attacked by João Franco, who boldly explained the reasons why he opposed the actions. These debates eventually resulted in the dissolution of the elected chamber, which was a controversial action on the part of the government. The government then revoked the electoral law, and substituted it (on 8 August 1901) with a comprehensive law, then immediately held general elections, resulting in João Franco and his political colleagues being disenfranchised.

This reinforced the split, resulting in the creation of a new party, the Liberal Regenerator Party, commonly called the Franquistas, for its new political leader. Five years later, the administration of the country was actively party-oriented, and the Franquistas acquired several supporters. The tobacco concession and other questions, galvanized public opinion and the two mainlines parties, the Progressives and Regenerators, were incapable of maintaining their support, causing the abandon of several deputies to other parties.

=== Prime minister ===
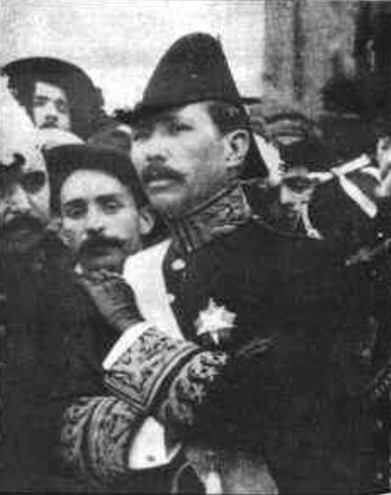
One of the more memorable images of João Franco alongside members of government

In May 1906, tired of continued politicization, the King requested João Franco form a new government: it was composed of João Franco, as president of the council for the kingdom; Ernesto Driesel Schroeter, Finances; Luís Cipriano Coelho de Magalhães, Foreign Relations; Aires de Ornelas e Vasconcelos, Marines/Navy; António Carlos Coelho de Vasconcelos Porto, War; José de Abreu do Couto Amorim Novais, Justice; and José Malheiro Reimão, Public Works. By the time the proclamation was written the first Liberal Regenerator ministry had already adopted its first program, supported by the Progressive Party, in the self-styled concentração-liberal (liberal concentration). They immediately settled the tobacco issue in October 1906, with a new contract, and then implemented reforms, which they presented to the parliament: laws on public accounting, ministerial responsibility, the press and the repression of anarchists.

During the 20 November 1906 session, his ministry expelled from parliament many of the Republican Party deputies, including Afonso Costa and Alexandre Braga for their excessive zeal. During the entire legislative session João Franco made several remarks highlighting his oratorical skills, against the members of the opposition parties. By decree, issued 16 July 1906, he received the 303rd Grand Cross of the Order of the Tower and Sword for his services to the Crown.

Facing republican dissent, though, João Franco established an authoritarian government in 1907.

He was still in office when the king of Portugal, Carlos I, and his son and heir to the throne, Luis Filipe, were killed by republican revolutionaries on 1 February 1908.

Franco was soon forced out (4 February) and a non-partisan Francisco Ferreira do Amaral, with all-party support was installed in the ministry; he never again held office.

== Personal life ==
He married Maria Lívia Ferrari Schindler (1858–1950), of Swiss German and Italian descent, 915th Dame of the Royal Order of Queen Maria Luisa of Spain (3 November 1893), daughter of Gaspar Schindler and Maria Lívia Ferrari, both born and married in Lisbon, and had a son Frederico Gaspar Schindler Franco Castelo-Branco (18 March 1888 – 3 January 1931), married on 22 May 1919 to Maria Rita de Sá Pais do Amaral (14 September 1897 – 27 July 1926), daughter of the 5th Counts of Anadia, and had issue.

Political offices
Preceded by Ernesto Hintze Ribeiro	Prime Minister of Portugal (President of the Council of Ministers); 1906–1908	Succeeded by Francisco Ferreira do Amaral
