= 1734 in Portugal =

- Decades: 1710s; 1720s; 1730s; 1740s; 1750s
- See also: History of Portugal; Timeline of Portuguese history; List of years in Portugal

Events in the year 1734 in Portugal.

== Incumbents ==
- Monarch: John V

== Births ==
- 17 December – Maria I of Portugal, queen (died 1816)
- 31 December – Francisco Manoel de Nascimento, poet (died 1819)

== Deaths ==
- Ignácio Barbosa-Machado, historian (born 1686).
