= 1780 in Portugal =

- Centuries: 16th; 17th; 18th; 19th; 20th
- Decades: 1760s; 1770s; 1780s; 1790s; 1800s
- See also: List of years in Portugal

Events in the year 1780 in Portugal.

== Incumbents ==
- Monarch: Mary I

== Events ==
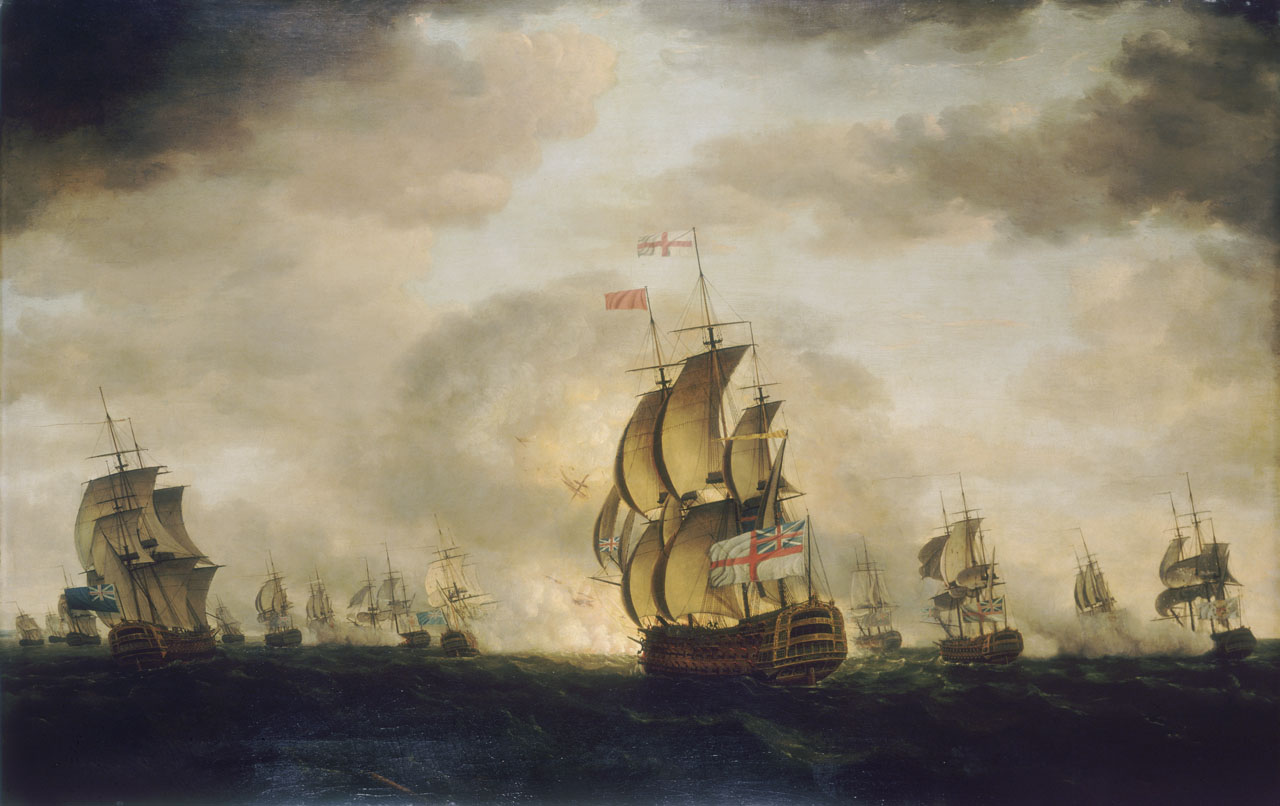
The moonlight Battle off Cape St Vincent, 16 January 1780 by Francis Holman, painted 1780, shows the Santo Domingo exploding, with Rodney's flagship Sandwich in the foreground.

- 16 January – Battle of Cape St. Vincent, a naval battle off the southern coast of Portugal during the Anglo-Spanish War. A British fleet defeated a Spanish squadron.

== Births ==
- 10 May – José Homem Correia Teles, judge and politician (d. 1849).
- 20 May – José Bernardino de Portugal e Castro, marquis (d. 1840)
- 12 July – Mouzinho da Silveira, statesman, jurist and politician (d. 1849)

== Deaths ==
- 18 January – Gaspar of Braganza, Archbishop of Braga (b. 1714)
- 23 October – João da Bemposta (b. 1726)

=== Full date missing ===
- Abade António da Costa, composer (b. 1714)
- Miguel António do Amaral, court painter (b. 1710)
