= De facto union =

Depending on the jurisdiction, de facto union may refer to:

- Common-law marriage, which is also called "marriage in fact"
- Civil union
- Unregistered cohabitation
- Domestic partnership

== See also ==
- De facto union in Portugal
