= 1886 in Portugal =

- Centuries: 17th; 18th; 19th; 20th; 21st
- Decades: 1860s; 1870s; 1880s; 1890s; 1900s
- See also: List of years in Portugal

Events in the year 1886 in Portugal.

== Incumbents ==
- Monarch: Luís I
- President of the Council of Ministers: Fontes Pereira de Melo (until 20 February), José Luciano de Castro (from 20 February)

== Events ==
- 12 May - Angola is incorporated as a colony.
- 19 May - Creation of the Duke of Albuquerque title.
- Homosexuality is criminalized.
- Completion of the Monument to the Restorers, in Restauradores Square, Lisbon.

== Births ==
- 29 January - Henrique de Sommer, industrialist (died 1944)
- 14 February - Luís Wittnich Carrisso, botanist (died 1937)
- 3 March - António Silva, actor (died 1971)

== Deaths ==
- 19 July - Cesário Verde, poet (born 1855)

== See also ==
- List of colonial governors in 1886 § Portugal
