= 1884 in Portugal =

- Centuries: 17th; 18th; 19th; 20th; 21st
- Decades: 1860s; 1870s; 1880s; 1890s; 1900s
- See also: List of years in Portugal

Events in the year 1884 in Portugal.

== Incumbents ==
- Monarch: Luís I
- President of the Council of Ministers: Fontes Pereira de Melo

== Events ==
- 11 May - Establishment of the Museu Nacional de Belas-Artes e Arqueologia.
- 29 June - Legislative election
- Opening of the Lisbon Zoo.
- Launch of NRP Afonso de Albuquerque.

== Births ==
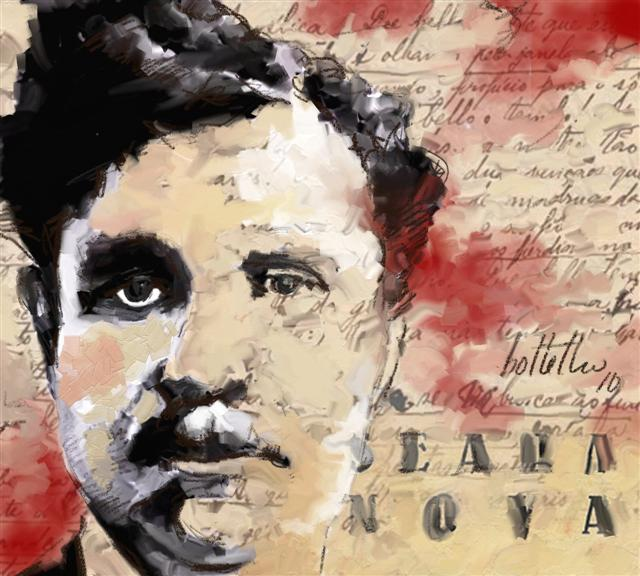
Raul Proença

- 22 January - Artur Santos, journalist, local politician (died 1955)
- 10 May - Raul Proença, writer, journalist, intellectual (died 1941)
- 24 August - Joaquim Vital, wrestler (deceased)

== Deaths ==
- 5 February - Infanta Maria Anna of Portugal, infanta (born 1843)
- 20 March - Henrique Pousão, painter (born 1859)
- 26 May - Joaquim António de Aguiar, politician (born 1792)
- 13 November - José Rodrigues Maio, hero, lifeguard, fisherman (born 1817)
- João Anastácio Rosa, actor, sculptor (born 1812)

== See also ==
- List of colonial governors in 1884 § Portugal
