= 1686 in Portugal =

- Decades: 1660s; 1670s; 1680s; 1690s; 1700s
- See also: History of Portugal; Timeline of Portuguese history; List of years in Portugal

The following events occurred in Portugal in the year 1686.

== Incumbents ==
- Monarch: Peter II

== Events ==
- 16 April – The Portuguese vessel Nossa Senhora dos Milagros with 150 crew run aground at Struisbaai near Cape Agulhas

== Births ==
- Ignácio Barbosa-Machado, historian (died 1734).
