= 1918 in Portugal =

- Centuries: 18th; 19th; 20th; 21st
- Decades: 1890s; 1900s; 1910s; 1920s; 1930s
- See also: List of years in Portugal

Events in the year 1918 in Portugal.

== Incumbents ==
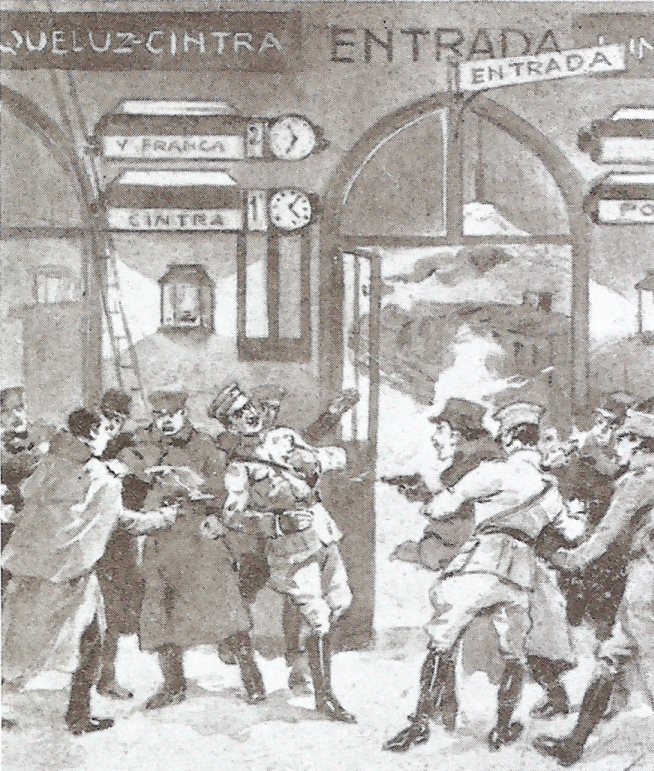
The murder of Portuguese president Sidónio Pais at the Lisboa-Rossio Railway Station, on 14 December 1918.

- President: Sidónio Pais until 14 December; João do Canto e Castro
- Prime Minister: Sidónio Bernardino Cardoso da Silva Pais; João do Canto e Castro; João Tamagnini de Sousa Barbosa

== Events ==
- 28 April – Portuguese general election, 1918.
- 14 October – Action of 14 October 1918
- The Portuguese Maximalist Federation founded
- Establishment of the National Republican Party.

== Arts and entertainment ==
- The D. Diogo de Sousa Museum established

== Sports ==
- 19 March – C.D. Feirense founded

== Deaths ==
- 14 May – Joaquim Pimenta de Castro, military officer, mathematician and politician (born 1846)
- 14 October - Carvalho Araújo
- 14 December – Sidónio Pais, politician and diplomat (born 1872)
