= 1984 in Portugal =

- Decades: 1960s; 1970s; 1980s; 1990s; 2000s
- See also: History of Portugal; Timeline of Portuguese history; List of years in Portugal

Events in the year 1984 in Portugal.

== Incumbents ==
- President: António Ramalho Eanes
- Prime Minister: Mário Soares (Socialist)

== Events ==
- 25 March - Pope John Paul II consecrates the world to the Immaculate Heart of Mary, in Fátima, Portugal.
- 29 August - Tiago José Rodrigues Cardoso - Born in Guimarães.
- 14 October - Azores regional election.
- 14 October - Madeira regional election.
- 27 December - Born Basilio Airosa in mafamude from the love of Ernesto Airosa and Manuela

== Arts and entertainment ==
Portugal participated in the Eurovision Song Contest 1984 with Maria Guinot and the song "Silêncio e tanta gente".

== Sports ==
In association football, for the first-tier league seasons, see 1983–84 Primeira Divisão and 1984–85 Primeira Divisão.

== Births ==
- 20 April - Nelson Évora, athlete
- 23 May - Hugo Almeida, footballer
- 16 July - Miguel Pires, swimmer
- 14 September - Maria Areosa, professional triathlete
- 25 October - mimicat, Musical artist

== Deaths ==
- 18 January - Ary dos Santos, poet, songwriter (born 1937)
