= 1515 in Portugal =

- Centuries: 15th; 16th; 17th; 18th
- Decades: 1490s; 1500s; 1510s; 1520s; 1530s
- See also: List of years in Portugal

Events in the year 1515 in Portugal.

== Incumbents ==
- King of Portugal and the Algarves: Manuel I

== Events ==
- 2 February - Creation of the Count of Vimioso title of nobility.
- Creation of the Duke of Goa title.
- Afonso de Albuquerque ended his term as Governor of Portuguese India.
- Lopo Soares de Albergaria becomes Governor of Portuguese India.
- The Fort Santo Antonio was built.

== Births ==
- 7 October - Edward of Portugal, 4th Duke of Guimarães, infante (died 1540)
- Cristóvão da Costa, doctor and natural historian (died 1594)
- Febo Moniz, nobleman

== Deaths ==
- 10 April - Mateus Fernandes, architect
- 16 December - Afonso de Albuquerque (born 1453)

== See also ==
- History of Portugal (1415–1578)
