= 1887 in Portugal =

- Centuries: 17th; 18th; 19th; 20th; 21st
- Decades: 1860s; 1870s; 1880s; 1890s; 1900s
- See also: List of years in Portugal

Events in the year 1887 in Portugal.

== Incumbents ==
- Monarch: Louis I
- Prime Minister: José Luciano de Castro

== Events ==
- 6 March – Portuguese legislative election, 1887
- 1 December – Signing of the Sino-Portuguese Treaty of Peking, when sovereignty over Macau was surrendered to Portugal, or as in the Chinese interpretation, only administrative rights were transferred

== Births ==
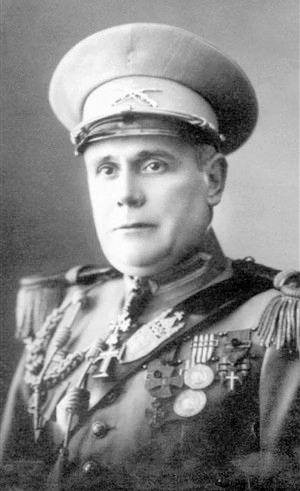
Artur Carlos de Barros Basto

- 7 March – Cyril Wright (rugby union), rugby player (died 1960)
- 21 March – Luís Filipe, Prince Royal of Portugal, prince (died 1908)
- 17 May – Froilano de Mello, microbiologist (died 1955)
- 14 November – Amadeo de Souza Cardoso, painter (died 1918)
- 18 December – Artur Carlos de Barros Basto, military officer (died 1961)

== Deaths ==
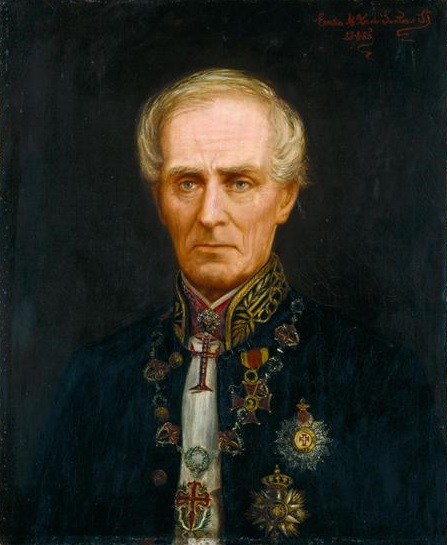
Manuel Inocêncio Liberato dos Santos

- 19 October – José Rodrigues, painter (born 1828)
- 11 November – Manuel Inocêncio Liberato dos Santos, musician (born 1802).

=== Full date unknown ===
- Fontes Pereira de Melo, statesman, politician, and engineer (born 1819)
