= 1926 in Portugal =

- Centuries: 18th; 19th; 20th; 21st
- Decades: 1900s; 1910s; 1920s; 1930s; 1940s
- See also: List of years in Portugal

Events in the year 1926 in Portugal.

== Incumbents ==
- President: Bernardino Machado (until 31 May), José Mendes Cabeçadas (from 31 May to 17 June), Manuel de Oliveira Gomes da Costa (from 19 June to 9 July), Óscar Carmona (from 9 July)
- Prime Minister: António Maria da Silva (until 30 May), José Mendes Cabeçadas (from 20 May to 17 June), Manuel de Oliveira Gomes da Costa (17 June to 9 July), Óscar Carmona (from 9 July)

== Events ==
- Establishment of the Portuguese Bar Association
- 28 May - Coup d'état, establishment of the Ditadura Nacional
- 31 August - 1926 Horta earthquake

== Sport ==
- Establishment of F.C. Porto (basketball)
- Establishment of Sporting Clube Lourinhanense
- Establishment of SC Mirandela
- 6 June - Campeonato de Portugal Final
- 1 July - Establishment of S.C. Campomaiorense
- 4 October - Establishment of A.C. Arrentela
- 19 November - Establishment of Anadia FC

== Births ==
- 18 October - Martinho (Carlos Martinho Gomes), former Portuguese footballer
