= 1849 in Portugal =

- Centuries: 17th; 18th; 19th; 20th; 21st
- Decades: 1820s; 1830s; 1840s; 1850s; 1860s
- See also: List of years in Portugal

Events in the year 1849 in Portugal.

== Incumbents ==
- Monarch: Mary II
- Prime Ministers: Saldanha (until 18 June); da Costa Cabral

== Events ==
- 18 June – António Bernardo da Costa Cabral, 1st Marquis of Tomar took over as prime minister after João Carlos Saldanha de Oliveira Daun, 1st Duke of Saldanha

== Births ==
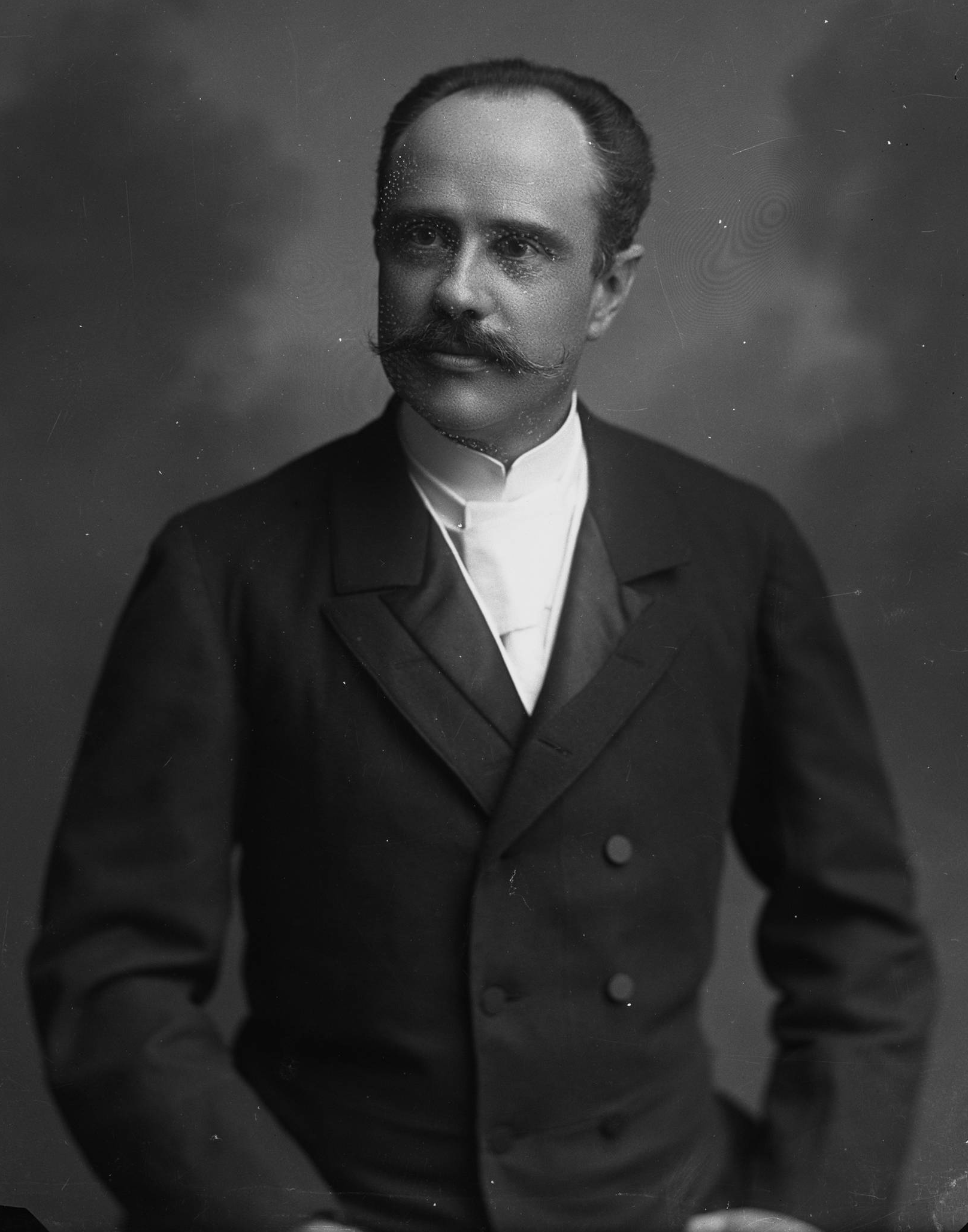
Ernesto Hintze Ribeiro

- 7 November – Ernesto Hintze Ribeiro, politician (died 1907)

== Deaths ==
- 3 July – José Homem Correia Teles, judge and politician (b. 1780).
