= 1415 in Portugal =

- Decades: 1410s; 1420s; 1430s
- See also: History of Portugal; Timeline of Portuguese history; List of years in Portugal

Events in the year 1415 in Portugal.

== Incumbents ==
- King: John I

== Events ==
- Conquest of Ceuta
- Creation of the Dukedom of Viseu

== Deaths ==
- 18 July - Philippa of Lancaster, Queen of Portugal
- Beatriz Pereira de Alvim, noblewoman

== See also ==
- History of Portugal (1279–1415)
- History of Portugal (1415–1578)
