= 1850 in Portugal =

- Centuries: 17th; 18th; 19th; 20th; 21st
- Decades: 1830s; 1840s; 1850s; 1860s; 1870s
- See also: List of years in Portugal

Events in the year 1850 in Portugal.

== Incumbents ==
- Monarch: Mary II
- Prime Minister: da Costa Cabral

== Events ==
- 18 October – the title Duke of Palmela established, first granted to Dom Pedro de Sousa Holstein

== Births ==
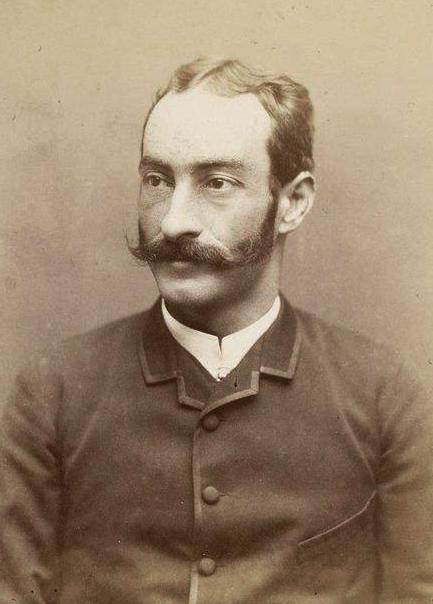
Roberto Ivens

- 12 June – Roberto Ivens, explorer of Africa, geographer, colonial administrator, and naval officer (died 1898).

== Deaths ==
- 12 October – Pedro de Sousa Holstein, 1st Duke of Palmela, diplomat and statesman (b. 1781)
