= Asdrúbal António d'Aguiar =

Asdrúbal António d'Aguiar (15 August 1883 – 28 November 1961) was a Portuguese physician and a leading figure in the field of forensic medicine in Portugal during the first half of the 20th century. He is particularly noted for his extensive writings on sexual offences and homosexuality from a medico-legal perspective.

== Life ==
Aguiar was born in Lisbon in 1883. He graduated in medicine in 1912 and immediately began his career as an assistant at the Institute of Forensic Medicine of Lisbon (Instituto de Medicina Legal de Lisboa). He remained at this institution for his entire professional life, eventually attaining a senior position. In addition to his forensic work, he held a teaching post in the Faculty of Medicine of the University of Lisbon and served as an Army captain, where he was responsible for the medico-legal services of the Lisbon Garrison. Through these roles, he established himself as Portugal's foremost expert in forensic medicine.

Asdrúbal António d'Aguiar died in Lisbon in 1961.

== Work ==
Aguiar published extensively, treating forensic medicine both as a practical discipline and as a tool for historical interpretation. A significant portion of his work focused on sexual crimes, anatomy, and sexual and gender anomalies. His publications include studies on rape, indecency, the female sexual organs, male homosexuality, and lesbianism.

His major work, Evolução da Pederastia e do Lesbismo na Europa: Contribuição para o Estudo da Inversão Sexual (Evolution of Pederasty and Lesbianism in Europe: Contribution to the Study of Sexual Inversion), was written in 1918 and published in 1926 in the Arquivo da Universidade de Lisboa (volume 11, pp. 335–620). It was later published separately as part of his series Sciencia Sexual: Contribuições para o seu Estudo. Livro V. Homosexualidade (c. 1927). The book opens with a chapter summarizing contemporary European medical knowledge on homosexuality, noting its presence across all social classes and detailing aspects such as slang, meeting places, behaviors, and physical characteristics, based on late-19th century medico-legal treatises. The remainder is a historical compendium of male and female homosexuality across different periods and European countries. While most of the content is derived from published sources, the section on contemporary Portugal includes recent anecdotes and reproduces Aguiar's own case notes from interviews with individuals arrested for homosexual acts. The work concludes with a summary of Portuguese law pertaining to homosexuality. Scholars note that Aguiar's approach in this work is detached, professional, and relatively objective for its time.

== Context and legacy ==
Aguiar's work is often discussed alongside that of his contemporary, Arlindo Camilo Monteiro, whose 1922 book Amor Sáfico e Socrático (Sapphic and Socratic Love) was also published under the auspices of the Lisbon forensic institute. Monteiro's more extensive and morally charged survey covered historical, scientific, and legal aspects of homosexuality, with a focus on Portugal. Together, the works of Aguiar and Monteiro demonstrate the absorption of contemporary European medico-scientific theories on homosexuality in Portugal by the 1920s. Historians find their greatest value today in their transcription of legal texts, detailed footnotes, and references to historical events and contemporary cases, which serve as important primary sources.

Other notable Portuguese medical figures who wrote on homosexuality in this period include Egas Moniz, a leading authority who believed homosexuality could be cured, and Luís A. Duarte Santos, a University of Coimbra lecturer who, in his 1943 work Sexo Invertido? Considerações sobre a Homossexualidade (Inverted Sex? Considerations on Homosexuality), argued against innate homosexuality and endorsed social penalties for homosexuals.

== See also ==
- LGBTQ rights in Portugal
