= 1975 in Portugal =

- Decades: 1950s; 1960s; 1970s; 1980s; 1990s
- See also: History of Portugal; Timeline of Portuguese history; List of years in Portugal

Events in the year 1975 in Portugal.

== Incumbents ==
- President: Francisco da Costa Gomes
- Prime Minister: Vasco Gonçalves (Independent) (until 25 September); José Baptista Pinheiro de Azevedo (Independent) (from 25 September)

== Arts and entertainment ==
Portugal participated in the Eurovision Song Contest 1975, with Duarte Mendes and the song "Madrugada".

== Sport ==
In association football, for the first-tier league seasons, see 1974–75 Primeira Divisão and 1975–76 Primeira Divisão; for the Taça de Portugal seasons, see 1974–75 Taça de Portugal and 1975–76 Taça de Portugal.

- 14 June - Taça de Portugal Final

Establishment of the Portuguese Handball Women's Cup. Establishment of G.D. Tourizense.
