= 1846 in Portugal =

- Centuries: 17th; 18th; 19th; 20th; 21st
- Decades: 1820s; 1830s; 1840s; 1850s; 1860s
- See also: List of years in Portugal

Events in the year 1846 in Portugal.

== Incumbents ==
- Monarch: Mary II
- Prime Ministers: António Bernardo da Costa Cabral, 1st Marquis of Tomar; Pedro de Sousa Holstein, 1st Duke of Palmela; João Carlos Saldanha de Oliveira Daun, 1st Duke of Saldanha

== Events ==
- 6 October – Emboscada (palace coup)
- 19 November – Banco de Portugal established

== Births ==
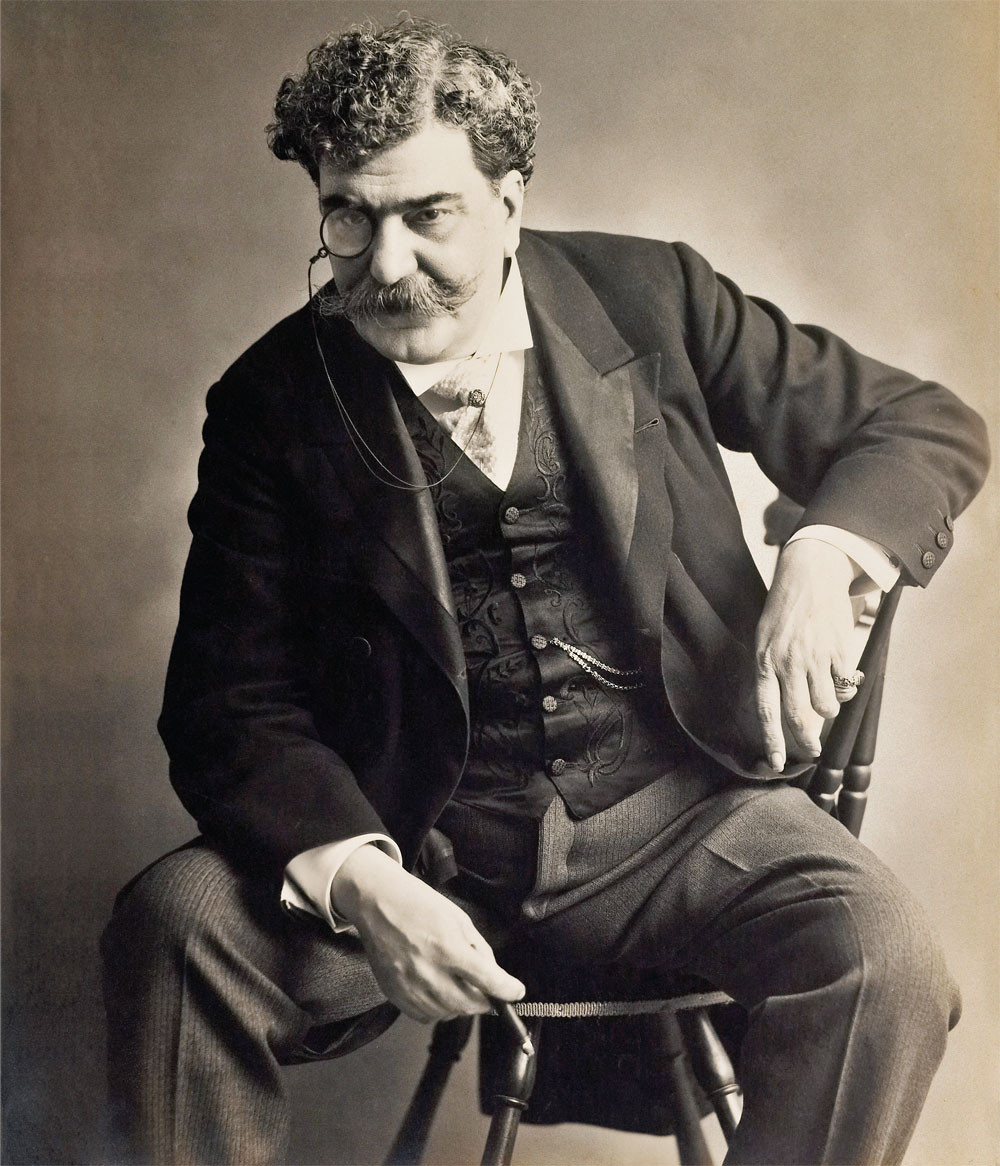
Rafael Bordalo Pinheiro

- 21 March – Rafael Bordalo Pinheiro, artist, comics creator (d. 1905).
- 5 November – Joaquim Pimenta de Castro, military officer, mathematician and politician (died 1918)
