= 2012 in Portugal =

- Decades: 1990s; 2000s; 2010s; 2020s; 2030s
- See also: History of Portugal; Timeline of Portuguese history; List of years in Portugal

Events in the year 2012 in Portugal.

== Incumbents ==
- President: Aníbal Cavaco Silva
- Prime Minister: Pedro Passos Coelho (Social Democratic)

== Events ==
=== May ===
- 1 May – 2012 Rush to Pingo Doce

=== September ===
- 15 September – 15 September 2012 Portuguese protests

== Arts and entertainment ==
In music: Portugal in the Eurovision Song Contest 2012.

== Sports ==
Football (soccer) competitions: Primeira Liga, Liga de Honra, Terceira Divisão, Taça da Liga, Taça de Portugal.

== Deaths ==
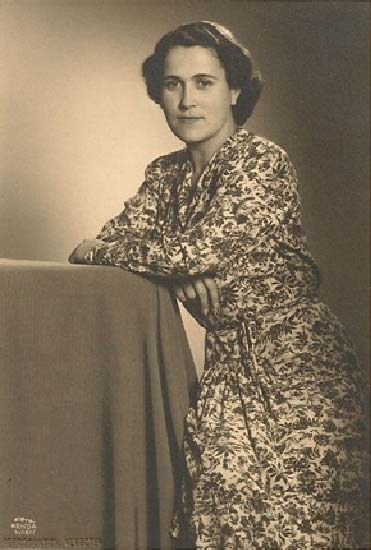
Infanta Maria Adelaide

- 4 February – Fernando Lanhas, painter (born 1923).
- 21 February – Manuel Franco da Costa de Oliveira Falcão, Roman Catholic prelate, Bishop of Beja (born 1922).
- 24 February – Infanta Maria Adelaide, royal (born 1912).
- 28 February – Jaime Graça, footballer (born 1942).

== See also ==
- List of Portuguese films of 2012
