= 1923 in Portugal =

- Decades: 1900s; 1910s; 1920s; 1930s; 1940s
- See also: History of Portugal; Timeline of Portuguese history; List of years in Portugal

Events in the year 1923 in Portugal.

== Incumbents ==
- President: António José de Almeida (until 5 October); Manuel Teixeira Gomes (starting 5 October)
- Prime Minister: António Maria da Silva (until 15 November); António Ginestal Machado (15 November–18 December); Álvaro de Castro (starting 18 December)

== Events ==
- Disestablishment of the Reconstitution Party, the Republican Liberal Party and the National Republican Party.

== Sports ==
- Amarante FC founded
- S.C. Covilhã founded
- Louletano D.C. founded
- A.C. Marinhense founded

== Births ==
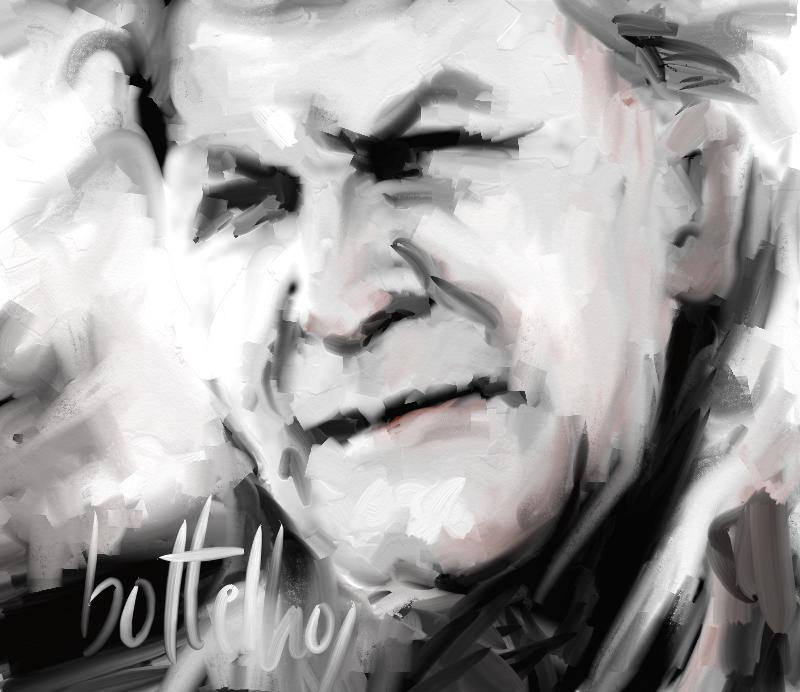
Eugénio de Andrade

- 19 January – Eugénio de Andrade, poet (died 2005))
- 16 August – Francisco de Andrade, sailor and Olympic medalist. (died 2021)
- 10 September – Alfredo Nobre da Costa, engineer and politician (died 1996)
- 16 September – Fernando Lanhas, painter (died 2012)

== Deaths ==
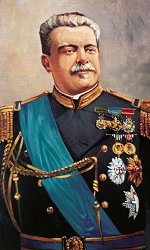
Francisco Joaquim Ferreira do Amaral

- 11 August – Francisco Joaquim Ferreira do Amaral, naval commander and politician (b. 1843).
