= 1880 in Portugal =

- Centuries: 17th; 18th; 19th; 20th; 21st
- Decades: 1860s; 1870s; 1880s; 1890s; 1900s
- See also: List of years in Portugal

Events in the year 1880 in Portugal.

== Incumbents ==
- Monarch: Louis I
- Prime Minister: Anselmo José Braamcamp

== Sports ==
- S.U. 1º de Dezembro founded

== Births ==
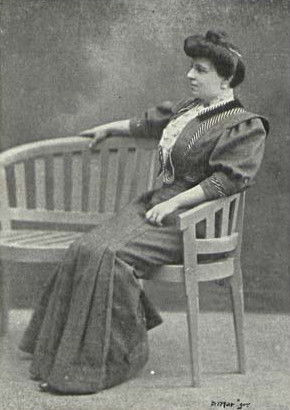
Branca de Gonta Colaço in 1908

- 8 July – Branca de Gonta Colaço, writer, scholar and linguist (d. 1945)
- 29 September – Liberato Pinto, politician (died 1949)

=== Full date missing ===
- Fernando Correia, fencer.
