= 1888 in Portugal =

- Centuries: 17th; 18th; 19th; 20th; 21st
- Decades: 1860s; 1870s; 1880s; 1890s; 1900s
- See also: List of years in Portugal

Events in the year 1888 in Portugal.

== Incumbents ==
- Monarch: Louis I
- Prime Minister: José Luciano de Castro

== Events ==
- 21 June – first published issue of the newspaper Jornal de Notícias

== Arts and entertainment ==
Os Maias – novel by José Maria de Eça de Queiroz

== Births ==
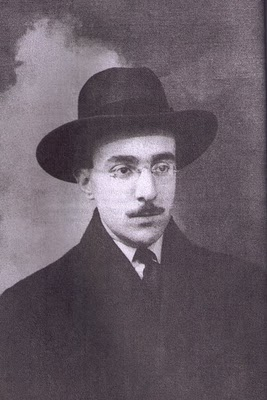
Fernando Pessoa

- 22 August – Francisco Cunha Leal, politician (died 1970)
- 30 December – Ruimondo Mayer, fencer (died 1959).
- 13 June; Fernando Pessoa, Poet, writer, and translator (died 1935)
