= 1980 in Portugal =

- Decades: 1960s; 1970s; 1980s; 1990s; 2000s
- See also: History of Portugal; Timeline of Portuguese history; List of years in Portugal

Events in the year 1980 in Portugal.

== Incumbents ==
- President: António Ramalho Eanes
- Prime Minister: Maria de Lourdes Pintasilgo (Independent) (until 3 January); Francisco Sá Carneiro (Social Democratic) (from 3 January to 4 December); Diogo Freitas do Amaral (Democratic Social Center) (interim, from 4 December)

== Events ==
- 1 January – 1980 Azores Islands earthquake
- 5 October – Portuguese legislative election, 1980
- 4 December – Prime minister Francisco de Sá Carneiro dies.
- 7 December – Portuguese presidential election, 1980

== Births ==
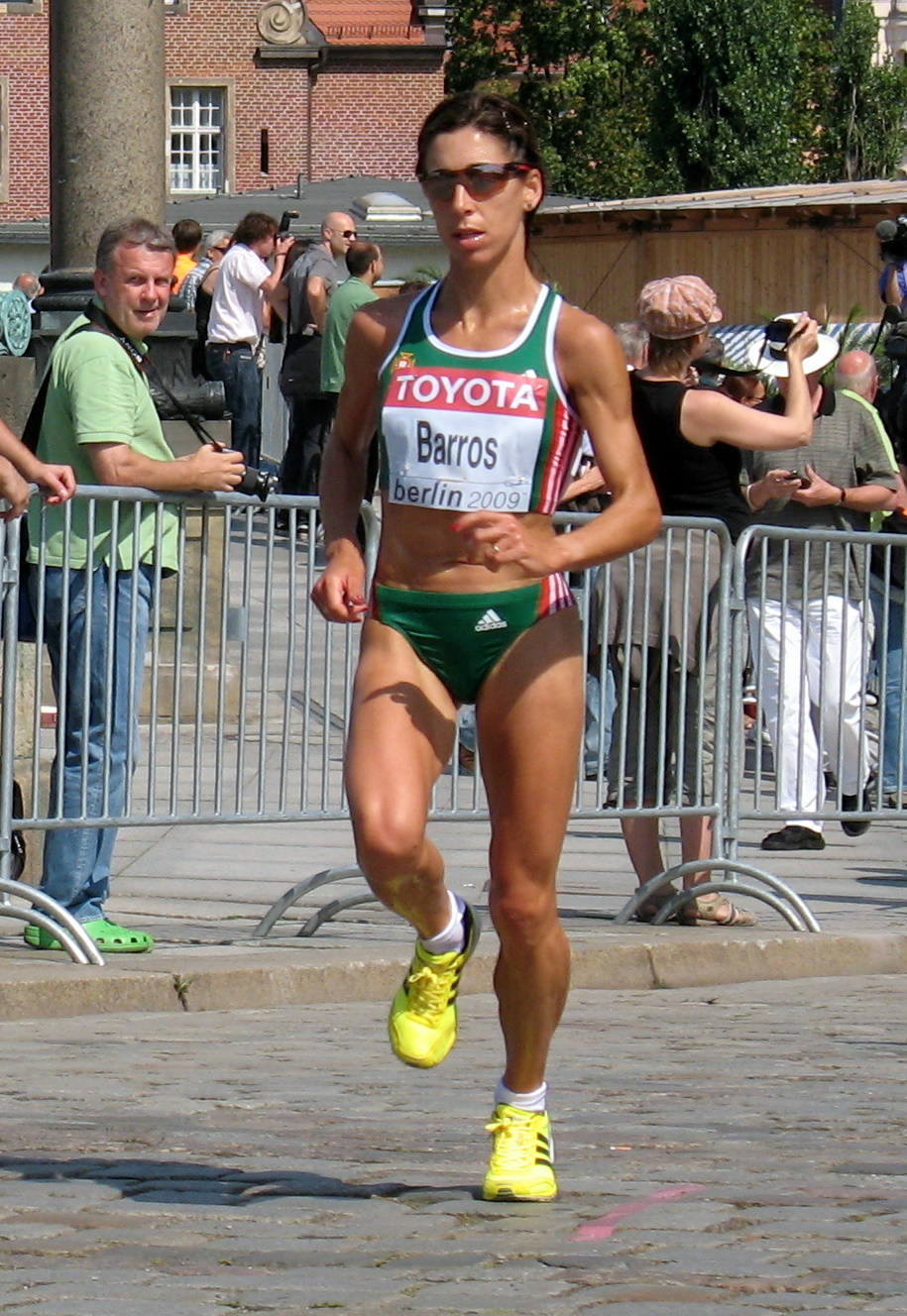
Marisa Barros

- 25 February – Marisa Barros, runner.

== Deaths ==
- 4 December – Francisco de Sá Carneiro, politician (born 1934)
