= 1919 in Portugal =

- Centuries: 18th; 19th; 20th; 21st
- Decades: 1890s; 1900s; 1910s; 1920s; 1930s
- See also: List of years in Portugal

The following events occurred in Portugal in the year 1919.

== Incumbents ==
- President: João do Canto e Castro; António José de Almeida
- Prime Minister: João Tamagnini de Sousa Barbosa; José Relvas; Domingos Leite Pereira; Alfredo de Sá Cardoso

== Events ==
- 11 May – Portuguese legislative election, 1919.
- Establishment of the Republican Liberal Party.
- Disestablishment of the Evolutionist Party and Republican Union political parties.

== Births ==
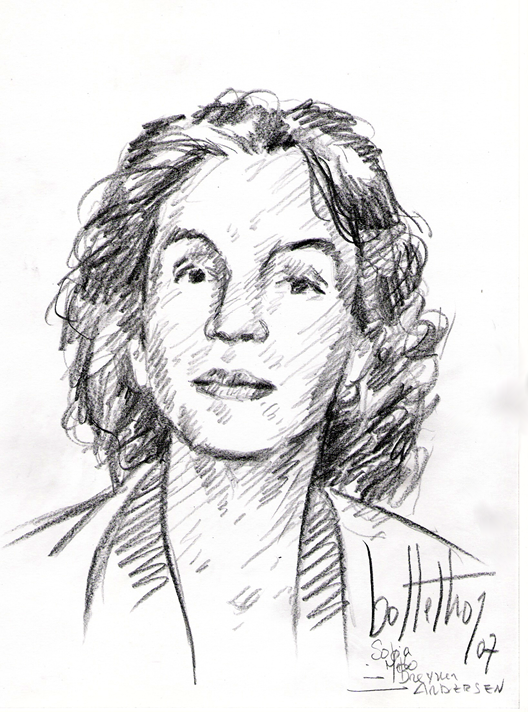
Sophia de Mello Breyner Andresen

- 6 November – Sophia de Mello Breyner Andresen, poet (died 2004).
