= 1982 in Portugal =

- Decades: 1960s; 1970s; 1980s; 1990s; 2000s
- See also: History of Portugal; Timeline of Portuguese history; List of years in Portugal

Events in the year 1982 in Portugal.

== Incumbents ==
- President: António Ramalho Eanes
- Prime Minister: Francisco Pinto Balsemão (Social Democratic)

== Events ==
- 12 December - Local election.

== Arts and entertainment ==
Portugal participated in the Eurovision Song Contest 1982 with Doce and the song "Bem bom".

== Sports ==
In association football, for the first-tier league seasons, see 1981–82 Primeira Divisão and 1982–83 Primeira Divisão.

- Establishment of the Portuguese Handball Super Cup

== Births ==
- 28 February – Isabel Mendes Lopes, politician
