= 1983 in Portugal =

- Decades: 1960s; 1970s; 1980s; 1990s; 2000s
- See also: History of Portugal; Timeline of Portuguese history; List of years in Portugal

Events in the year 1983 in Portugal.

== Incumbents ==
- President: António Ramalho Eanes
- Prime Minister: Francisco Pinto Balsemão (Social Democratic) (until 9 June); Mário Soares (Socialist) (from 9 June)

== Events ==
- 27 July – Turkish embassy attack in Lisbon.

== Sports ==
Football (soccer) competitions: Primeira Liga

- 8 and 14 December - 1983 Supertaça Cândido de Oliveira

== Births ==
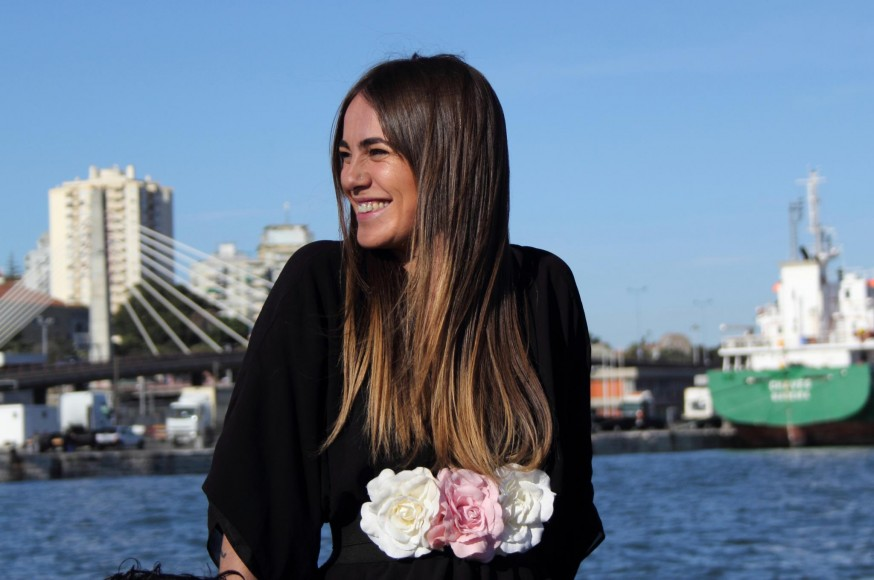
Gisela João

- 13 August – Francisco Adam, actor (died 2006).
- 6 November – Gisela João, fado singer

== Deaths ==
- 19 August – José Baptista Pinheiro de Azevedo naval officer and politician (born 1917)
