= 1883 in Portugal =

- Centuries: 17th; 18th; 19th; 20th; 21st
- Decades: 1860s; 1870s; 1880s; 1890s; 1900s
- See also: List of years in Portugal

Events in the year 1883 in Portugal.

== Incumbents ==
- Monarch: Louis I
- Prime Minister: de Melo

== Births ==
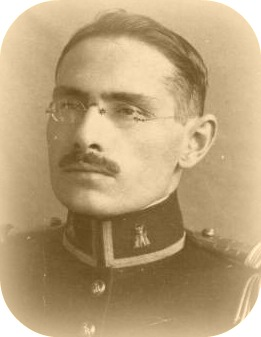
João Tamagnini Barbosa

- 5 April – Carlos Sampaio Garrido, diplomat (died 1960)
- 19 August – José Mendes Cabeçadas, military officer and politician (died 1965)
- 30 December (in Portuguese colony Macau) – João Tamagnini Barbosa, military officer and politician (died in 1948)
- Gil de Andrade, fencer.
- Manuel Queiróz, fencer.

== Deaths ==
- 26 February – Miguel Ângelo Lupi, painter (born 1826)
