= 1922 in Portugal =

- Decades: 1900s; 1910s; 1920s; 1930s; 1940s
- See also: History of Portugal; Timeline of Portuguese history; List of years in Portugal

Events in the year 1922 in Portugal.

== Incumbents ==
- President: António José de Almeida
- Prime Minister: Francisco da Cunha Leal (until 6 February); António Maria da Silva (starting 6 February)

== Events ==
- 29 January – Portuguese legislative election, 1922.

== Sports ==
- 31 March – first issue of Jornal Sporting
- S.C. Beira-Mar founded
- S.C. Lusitânia founded
- Padroense F.C. founded
- SC Bustelo founded
- 22 September – V.S.C. - Vitória Sport Clube founded

== Births ==
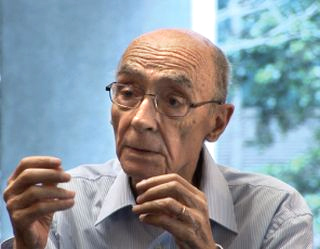
José Saramago

- 3 May – Vasco Gonçalves, military officer and politician (died 2005)
- 10 November – Manuel Franco da Costa de Oliveira Falcão, Roman Catholic prelate, Bishop of Beja (died 2012).
- José Saramago, novelist, poet, playwright, journalist and Nobel laureate (died 2010).
