= 1798 in Portugal =

- Centuries: 16th; 17th; 18th; 19th; 20th
- Decades: 1770s; 1780s; 1790s; 1800s; 1810s
- See also: List of years in Portugal

Events in the year 1798 in Portugal.

== Incumbents ==
- Monarch: Mary I

== Births ==
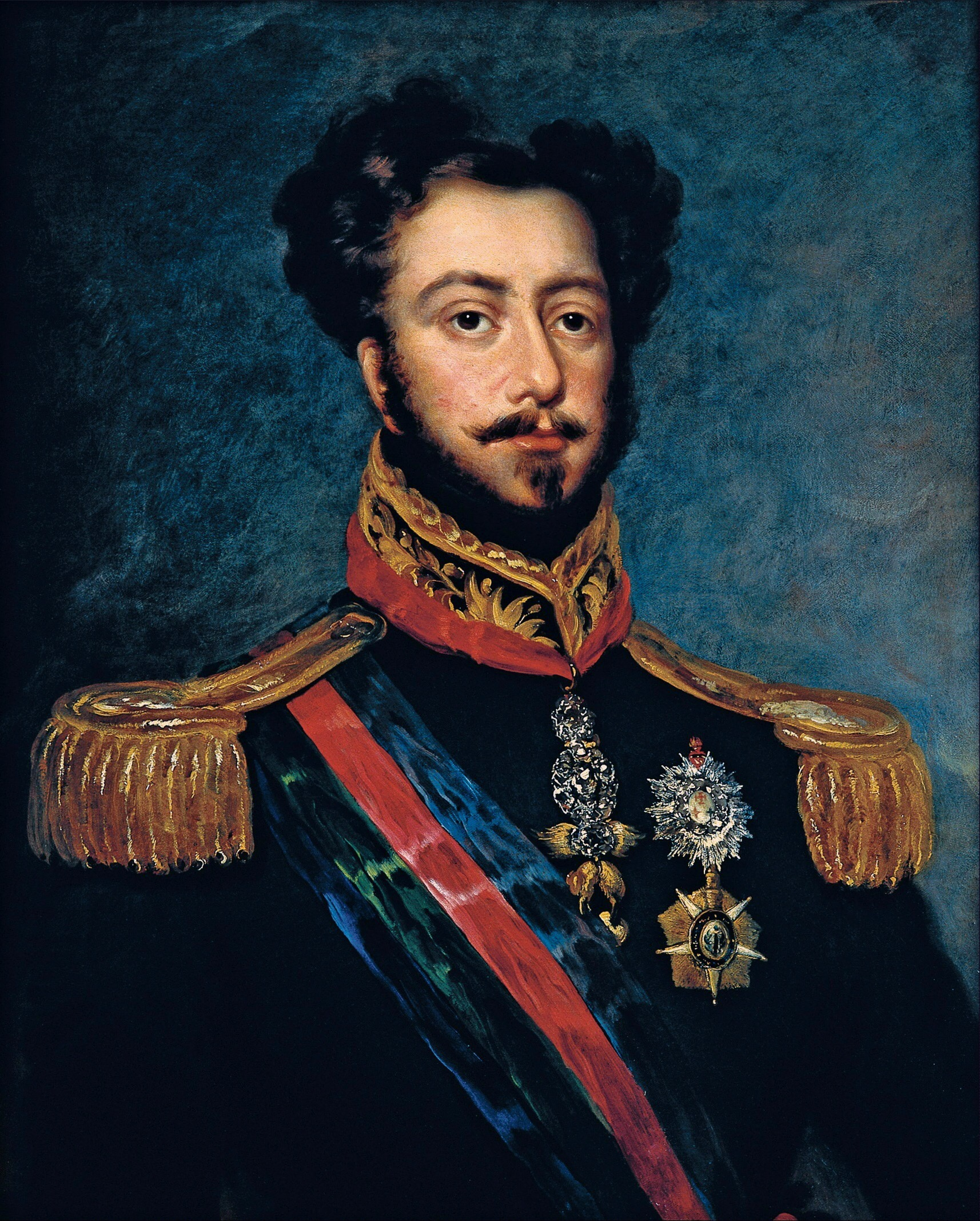
Pedro I of Brazil, or Pedro IV of Portugal.

- 12 October – King Dom Pedro IV, King of Portugal, Emperor of Brazil (died 1834).

== Deaths ==
- 18 October – Francisco de Lacerda, explorer (born 1750)
