= 1885 in Portugal =

- Decades: 1860s; 1870s; 1880s; 1890s; 1900s
- See also: History of Portugal; Timeline of Portuguese history; List of years in Portugal

Events in the year 1885 in Portugal.

== Incumbents ==
- Monarch: Louis I
- Prime Minister: de Melo

== Events ==
- The Berlin Conference for regulating European colonization and trade in Africa
- Signing of the Treaty of Simulambuco.

== Births ==
- 13 October – Francisco António Real, sports shooter.
- 2 November – Cosme Damião, Portuguese football player and manager (d. 1947)

== Deaths ==
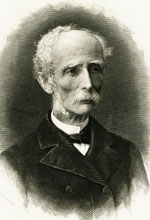
Anselmo José Braamcamp

- 13 November – Anselmo José Braamcamp, politician (born 1817)
- 15 December – Fernando II of Portugal, King of Portugal as husband of Queen Dona Maria II of Portugal from the birth of their son in 1837 to her death in 1853 (born 1816)
