= 1976 in Portugal =

- Decades: 1950s; 1960s; 1970s; 1980s; 1990s
- See also: History of Portugal; Timeline of Portuguese history; List of years in Portugal

Events in the year 1976 in Portugal.

== Incumbents ==
- President: Francisco da Costa Gomes (until 14 July); António Ramalho Eanes (from 14 July)
- Prime Minister: José Baptista Pinheiro de Azevedo (Independent) (until 23 June); Vasco de Almeida e Costa (Independent) (interim, from 23 June to 23 July); Mário Soares (Socialist) (from 23 July)

== Events ==
- 17 February - Organic Statute of Macau adopted. Macau gains autonomy within Portugal.
- 25 April - Legislative election
- 30 April - The Azores and Madeira gain autonomy within Portugal.
- 27 June - Presidential election
- 27 June - Azorean regional election
- Establishment of the I Constitutional Government of Portugal.
- The death penalty is abolished for all crimes.
- 3 September - A Lockheed C-130H Hercules crashed at the Azores Islands killing all 68 passengers and crew onboard.
- 12 December - Local election

== Culture ==
Portugal participated in the Eurovision Song Contest 1976 with Carlos do Carmo and the song "Uma flor de verde pinho".

== Sports ==
Portugal participated in the 1976 Summer Olympics.

In association football, for the first-tier league seasons, see 1975–76 Primeira Divisão and 1976–77 Primeira Divisão. The final of the Taça de Portugal was on 13 June.

== Births ==
- 19 October – Bruno Dias, politician

== Deaths ==
- 26 January – João Branco Núncio, bullfighter (b. 1901)
