= 1974 in Portugal =

- Decades: 1950s; 1960s; 1970s; 1980s; 1990s
- See also: History of Portugal; Timeline of Portuguese history; List of years in Portugal

Events in the year 1974 in Portugal.

== Incumbents ==
- President: Américo Tomás (until 25 April); António de Spínola (from 25 April to 30 September); Francisco da Costa Gomes (from 30 September)
- Prime Minister: Marcelo Caetano (People's National Action) (until 25 April), Junta de Salvação Nacional (Independent) (from 25 April to 16 May); Adelino da Palma Carlos (Independent) (from 16 May to 18 July); Vasco Gonçalves (Independent) (from 18 July)

== Events ==
- 25 April - Carnation Revolution

== Arts and entertainment ==
Portugal participated in the Eurovision Song Contest 1974, with Paulo de Carvalho and the song "E depois do adeus".

== Sport ==
In association football, for the first-tier league seasons, see 1973–74 Primeira Divisão and 1974–75 Primeira Divisão; for the Taça de Portugal seasons, see 1973–74 Taça de Portugal and 1974–75 Taça de Portugal.

- 9 June - Taça de Portugal Final
