= 1844 in Portugal =

- Decades: 1820s; 1830s; 1840s; 1850s; 1860s
- See also: History of Portugal; Timeline of Portuguese history; List of years in Portugal

Events in the year 1844 in Portugal.

== Incumbents ==
- Monarch: Mary II
- Prime Minister: António Bernardo da Costa Cabral, 1st Marquis of Tomar

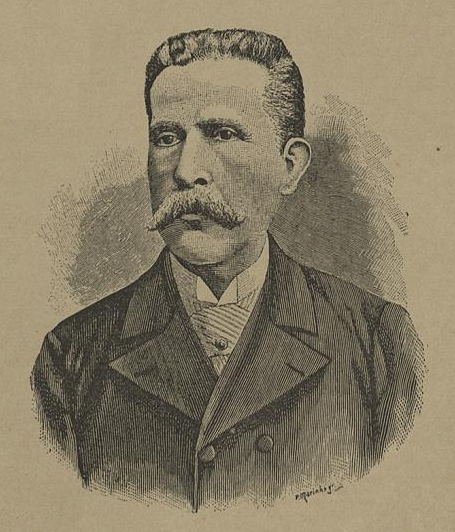
José Simões Dias in O Occidente (1899)

== Birth ==
=== Full date missing ===
- José Simões Dias, poet, short-story writer, literary critic, politician, pedagogue (died 1899).

== Deaths ==
- 18 November – Bernardo Peres da Silva, governor of Portuguese India (b. 1775)
