= 1981 in Portugal =

- Decades: 1960s; 1970s; 1980s; 1990s; 2000s
- See also: History of Portugal; Timeline of Portuguese history; List of years in Portugal

Events in the year 1981 in Portugal.

== Incumbents ==
- President: António Ramalho Eanes
- Prime Minister: Diogo de Freitas do Amaral (Democratic Social Center) (interim, until 9 January); Francisco Pinto Balsemão (Social Democratic) (from 9 January)

== Events ==
- 9 January - Establishment of the VII Constitutional Government of Portugal.
- 4 September - Establishment of the VIII Constitutional Government of Portugal.

== Arts and entertainment ==
Portugal participated in the Eurovision Song Contest 1981 with Carlos Paião performing the song "Playback".

== Sports ==
In association football, for first-tier league seasons, see 1980–81 Primeira Divisão and 1981–82 Primeira Divisão.

- 1 and 8 December - 1981 Supertaça Cândido de Oliveira
