= 1977 in Portugal =

- Decades: 1950s; 1960s; 1970s; 1980s; 1990s
- See also: History of Portugal; Timeline of Portuguese history; List of years in Portugal

This is a list of events that occurred in the year 1977 in Portugal.

== Incumbents ==
- President: António Ramalho Eanes
- Prime Minister: Mário Soares (Socialist)

== Arts and entertainment ==
Portugal participated in the Eurovision Song Contest 1977, with Os Amigos and the song "Portugal no coração".

== Sport ==
In association football, for the first-tier league seasons, see 1976–77 Primeira Divisão and 1977–78 Primeira Divisão; for the Taça de Portugal seasons, see 1976–77 Taça de Portugal and 1977–78 Taça de Portugal.

- 18 May - Taça de Portugal Final

== Births ==
- 4 February – Bruno Castanheira, Portuguese cyclist (d. 2014)
- 10 July – Nuno Norte, singer and winner of Ídolos (season 1)
