= 1185 in Portugal =

- Centuries
- Decades
- See also: List of years in Portugal

Events in the year 1185 in Portugal.

== Incumbents ==
- King: Alfonso I, Sancho I

== Events ==
- Coronation of Sancho I

== Deaths ==
- December 6 - Alfonso I
