= 1921 in Portugal =

- Decades: 1900s; 1910s; 1920s; 1930s; 1940s
- See also: History of Portugal; Timeline of Portuguese history; List of years in Portugal

Events in the year 1921 in Portugal.

== Incumbents ==
- President: António José de Almeida
- Prime Ministers: Seven different

== Events ==
- 6 March – Portuguese Communist Party founded
- 10 July – Portuguese legislative election, 1921.
- 19 October - Bloody Night

== Sports ==
- Gondomar S.C. founded
- A.D. Ovarense founded
- S.C. Braga founded

== Births ==
- 4 August – Carlos Galvão de Melo, military officer and politician (died 2008)

== Deaths ==
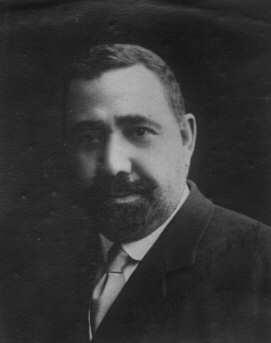
António Granjo

- 7 June – Sebastião Custódio de Sousa Teles, military officer and politician (born 1847)
- 19 October – António Granjo, lawyer and politician (born 1881)
