= 1644 in Portugal =

- Centuries: 15th; 16th; 17th; 18th; 19th
- Decades: 1620s; 1630s; 1640s; 1650s; 1660s
- See also: List of years in Portugal

Events in the year 1644 in Portugal.

== Incumbents ==
- King: John IV

== Events ==
- May 26 - Battle of Montijo
