= 1847 in Portugal =

- Centuries: 17th; 18th; 19th; 20th; 21st
- Decades: 1820s; 1830s; 1840s; 1850s; 1860s
- See also: List of years in Portugal

Events in the year 1847 in Portugal.

== Incumbents ==
- Monarch: Mary II
- Prime Ministers: João Carlos Saldanha de Oliveira Daun, 1st Duke of Saldanha

== Events ==
- 29 June – Convention of Gramido

== Births ==
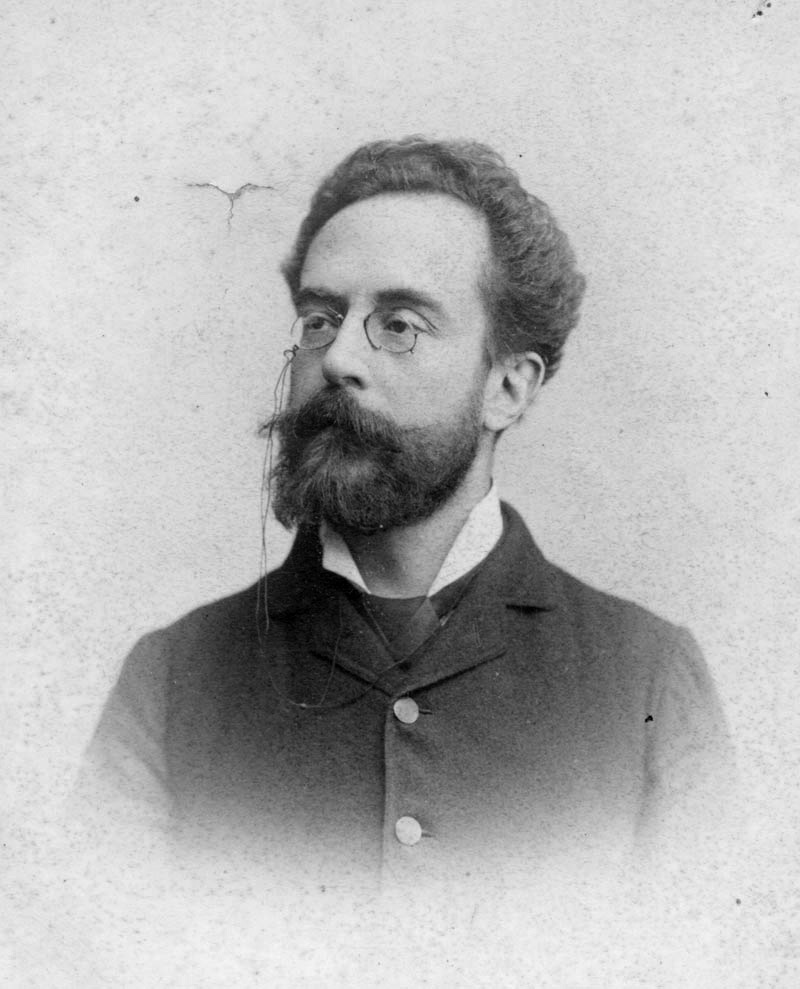
Jaime Batalha Reis

- 27 July – Sebastião Custódio de Sousa Teles, military officer and politician (died 1921)
- 4 November – Infante Augusto, Duke of Coimbra, Royal prince (died 1889)
- 24 December – Jaime Batalha Reis, agronomist and diplomat.
