= 1641 in Portugal =

- Decades: 1620s; 1630s; 1640s; 1650s; 1660s
- See also: History of Portugal; Timeline of Portuguese history; List of years in Portugal

Events in the year 1641 in Portugal.

== Incumbents ==
- King: John IV

== Events ==
- March 27 – beginning of the 11 month Siege of São Filipe near Angra do Heroismo in the Azores
- June 12 – Treaty of The Hague (1641) is signed in The Hague representatives of the States-General of the Netherlands and by the ambassador of the Kingdom of Portugal
- November 18 – John IV ratifies the treaty of The Hague

== Deaths ==
- Sebastião de Matos de Noronha
