= 1139 in Portugal =

- Decades
- See also: List of years in Portugal

Events in the year 1139 in Portugal.

== Incumbents ==
- King: Afonso I of Portugal

== Events ==
- Battle of Ourique
