= 1489 in Portugal =

- Decades: 1460s; 1470s; 1480s; 1490s; 1500s
- See also: History of Portugal; Timeline of Portuguese history; List of years in Portugal

Events in the year 1489 in Portugal.

== Incumbents ==
- King of Portugal and the Algarves: John II

== Events ==
- 1 March - Creation of the Marquis of Vila Real title of nobility
- First printed book.
- Establishment of the Graciosa fortress

== See also ==
- History of Portugal (1415–1578)
