= 1508 in Portugal =

- Centuries: 15th; 16th; 17th; 18th
- Decades: 1480s; 1490s; 1500s; 1510s; 1520s
- See also: List of years in Portugal

Events in the year 1508 in Portugal.

== Incumbents ==
- King of Portugal and the Algarves: Manuel I

== Events ==
- March - Battle of Chaul
- Afonso de Albuquerque began his term as Governor of Portuguese India.
- Duarte de Menezes began his term as Governor of Tangier.

== Deaths ==
- March - Lourenço de Almeida, explorer and military commander (born c.1480)
- 18 September - Jorge da Costa, Cardinal (born 1406)
- Isaac Abrabanel, statesman, philosopher, Bible commentator and financier (born 1437)

== See also ==
- History of Portugal (1415–1578)
