= 1925 in Portugal =

- Decades: 1900s; 1910s; 1920s; 1930s; 1940s
- See also: History of Portugal; Timeline of Portuguese history; List of years in Portugal

Events in the year 1925 in Portugal.

== Incumbents ==
- President: Manuel Teixeira Gomes (until 11 December), Bernardino Machado (starting 11 December)
- Prime Ministers: Four different

== Events ==
- The Democratic Leftwing Republican Party founded
- 8 November – Portuguese legislative election, 1925.
- 11 December – Bernardino Machado takes over as President
- Establishment of the Union of Economic Interests political party.

== Sports ==
- 28 June - 1925 Campeonato de Portugal Final, in Viana do Castelo, between Porto and Sporting CP, won by Porto
- 9 September - The Leiria Football Association established.
- CF Andorinha founded
- SC Maria da Fonte founded

== Deaths ==
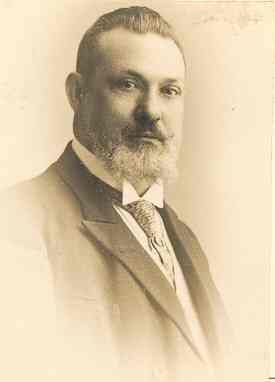
Tomé de Barros Queirós

- 5 May – Tomé de Barros Queirós, trader and politician (born 1872)
