= List of Portuguese films of 2012 =

A list of Portuguese films that were first released in 2012. 29 Portuguese films were released, including 26 feature films, accounting for 4.9% of the total box office gross, 5.3% of the total number of admissions and 9% of the total number of films in Portugal.

Release date	Title	Director	Cast	Genre	Notes	Ref
March 8	Florbela	Vicente Alves do Ó				
April 5	Tabu	Miguel Gomes			Co-production	
April 19	Assim Assim	Sérgio Graciano				
April 19	Capitães da Areia	Cecília Amado, Guy Gonçalves			Co-production	
August 30	Morangos com Açúcar – O Filme	Hugo de Sousa				
September 6	Balas & Bolinhos - O Último Capítulo	Luís Ismael				
October 4	Lines of Wellington	Valeria Sarmiento				
October 11	O Gebo e a Sombra	Manoel de Oliveira			Co-production	
November 8	O Cônsul de Bordéus	Francisco Manso, João Correa				
November 22	Operação Outono	Bruno de Almeida			Co-production	

== See also ==
- 2012 in Portugal
