= 1881 in Portugal =

- Centuries: 17th; 18th; 19th; 20th; 21st
- Decades: 1860s; 1870s; 1880s; 1890s; 1900s
- See also: List of years in Portugal

Events in the year 1881 in Portugal.

== Incumbents ==
- Monarch: Louis I
- Prime Ministers: Braamcamp; Sampaio; de Melo

== Events ==
- 21 August – Portuguese legislative election, 1881.

== Births ==
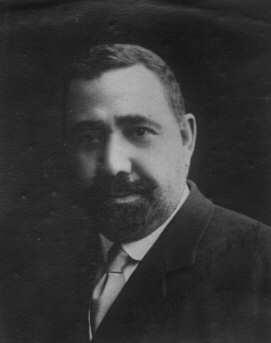
António Granjo

- 27 December – António Granjo, lawyer and politician (died 1921)
