= 1920 in Portugal =

- Decades: 1900s; 1910s; 1920s; 1930s; 1940s
- See also: History of Portugal; Timeline of Portuguese history; List of years in Portugal

Events in the year 1920 in Portugal.

== Incumbents ==
- President: António José de Almeida
- Prime Minister: Frequent changes – Cardosu, Pereira, Baptista, Preto, da Silva, Granjo, de Castro, Pinto.

== Events ==
- Establishment of the Reconstitution Party.

== Sports ==
- Portugal competes in Fencing and Shooting at the Summer Olympics
- Casa Pia A.C. founded
- Estrela de Vendas Novas founded
- Imortal DC founded
- SC Vila Real founded

== Births ==
- 7 February – Miguel Lourenço, footballer (died unknown)

== Deaths ==
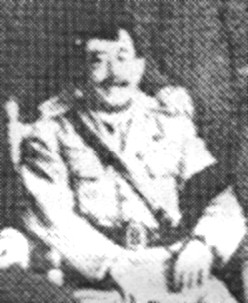
António Maria Baptista

- 6 June – António Maria Baptista, military officer and politician (born 1866)
