= LGBTQ history in Portugal =

LGBT history in Portugal has been one of general trends of progress, with some steps back.

== Early 20th century ==
The early 20th century saw homosexuality analyzed through a predominantly medical and forensic lens in Portugal. Key figures in this discourse included Asdrúbal António d'Aguiar, a leading forensic physician whose 1926 work Evolução da Pederastia e do Lesbismo na Europa catalogued homosexual subcultures and laws with a detached, clinical approach. His contemporary, Arlindo Camilo Monteiro, provided a more extensive, though morally charged, survey in Amor Sáfico e Socrático (1922). Later, prominent medical authorities like Nobel laureate Egas Moniz promoted the view that homosexuality was a curable pathology, while Luís A. Duarte Santos, in 1943, argued it was an acquired deviation for which individuals were morally responsible, endorsing societal sanctions. These works all incorporated European sexological theories into Portuguese science.

== Fall of the dictatorship after 1974 ==
The revolution of 25 April 1974, also known as the Carnation Revolution, is credited as being a crucial point in the change of LGBT representation within Portugal. Despite the overthrow of Portugal's dictatorships, the LGBT community was still sparsely discussed until the change of Portugal's Penal Code which decriminalized homosexuality as well as other things. From this point on, the LGBT movement made a slow climb into the public light and when Portugal joined the European Economic Community in 1986, their antidiscrimination policy caused substantial growth within the movement.

== Changes in the 21st century ==
While there was a variety of different movements and problems that arose during the 90s in relation to the LGBT movement, real change didn't happen until 2001 when parliament approved a law that "recognized cohabitation regardless of sexual orientation". Within the next decade and a half Portugal would go on to legalize same-sex marriage, adoption and established the procedure for legally changing an individual's gender.

A de facto union, also known as common-law marriage, is when two individuals who have been together for two years or more are considered legally married without the marriage being on paper. On 11 May 2001 Portugal's parliament approved a change to the de facto union law that extended the unions to same-sex couples.

On 31 May 2010 the law 9/2010 legalized and recognized the marriage of same-sex couples. This piece of legislation put Portugal at eighth in the world to legalize same-sex marriage and set them at the front of the LGBT citizenship rights within Europe.

On 15 March 2011, law number 7/2011 established the process for those who identify with the opposite sex to legally change their gender and name within the civil registry. This legislation specifically allows individuals who are transgender to change their identity without gender changing surgery as long as they have obtained an official gender dysphoria diagnosis. However, the diagnosis has to be made by a team of experts that specializes in "medical sexology", works within public or private medical offices in Portugal or another country, and the diagnosis must be reviewed and signed off by a psychologist and physician.

On 29 February 2016, law number 2/2016 made is illegal to discriminate against same-sex couples who wanted to adopt. This legislation also prevents discrimination when trying to acquire a civil sponsorship or any other family legal relationships. Prior to this law being passed in March 2014, there was an attempt to grant same-sex couples the same adoption rights as opposite sex couples but lost the 107 who were in favor lost in Parliament to the 111 who were against it.
