= 1924 in Portugal =

- Decades: 1900s; 1910s; 1920s; 1930s; 1940s
- See also: History of Portugal; Timeline of Portuguese history; List of years in Portugal

Events in the year 1924 in Portugal.

== Incumbents ==
- President: Manuel Teixeira Gomes
- Prime Minister: Álvaro de Castro (until 5 July); Alfredo Rodrigues Gaspar (5 July–22 November); Jose Domingues dos Santos (starting 22 November)

== Sports ==
- 8 June - Campeonato de Portugal Final, in Lisbon
- Sport Benfica e Castelo Branco founded

== Births ==
- 7 December – Mário Soares, president (d. 2017)

== Deaths ==
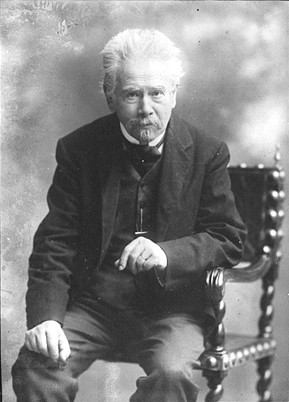
Teófilo Braga

- 28 January – Teófilo Braga, playwright and politician (born 1843).
