= 1659 in Portugal =

- Centuries: 15th; 16th; 17th; 18th; 19th
- Decades: 1630s; 1640s; 1650s; 1660s; 1670s
- See also: List of years in Portugal

Events in the year 1659 in Portugal.

== Incumbents ==
- King: Alfonso VI

== Events ==
- January 14 - Battle of the Lines of Elvas
