= 1978 in Portugal =

- Decades: 1950s; 1960s; 1970s; 1980s; 1990s
- See also: History of Portugal; Timeline of Portuguese history; List of years in Portugal

Events in the year 1978 in Portugal.

== Incumbents ==
- President: António Ramalho Eanes
- Prime Minister: Mário Soares (Socialist) (until 28 August); Alfredo Nobre da Costa (Independent) (from 28 August to 22 November); Carlos Mota Pinto (Independent) (from 22 November)

== Events ==
- 23 January - Establishment of the II Constitutional Government of Portugal.
- 29 August - Establishment of the III Constitutional Government of Portugal.
- 22 November - Establishment of the IV Constitutional Government of Portugal.

== Culture ==
Portugal participated in the Eurovision Song Contest 1978 with Gemini and the song "Dai li dou".

== Sports ==
In association football, for the first-tier league seasons, see 1977–78 Primeira Divisão and 1978–79 Primeira Divisão.

- Establishment of the 1ª Divisão de Andebol Feminino.
- Establishment of the Portuguese Handball Third Division.
- 17 and 24 June - 1978 Taça de Portugal Final
