= 1767 in Portugal =

- Centuries: 16th; 17th; 18th; 19th; 20th
- Decades: 1740s; 1750s; 1760s; 1770s; 1780s
- See also: List of years in Portugal

Events in the year 1767 in Portugal.

== Incumbents ==
- Monarch: Joseph I

== Births ==
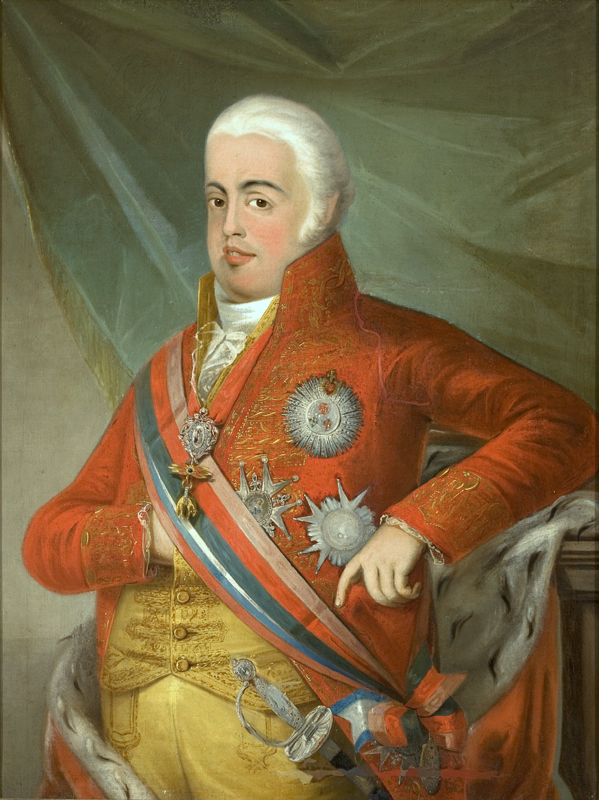
John VI of Portugal,

- 13 May – John VI of Portugal, king (died 1826).
