= 1979 in Portugal =

- Decades: 1950s; 1960s; 1970s; 1980s; 1990s
- See also: History of Portugal; Timeline of Portuguese history; List of years in Portugal

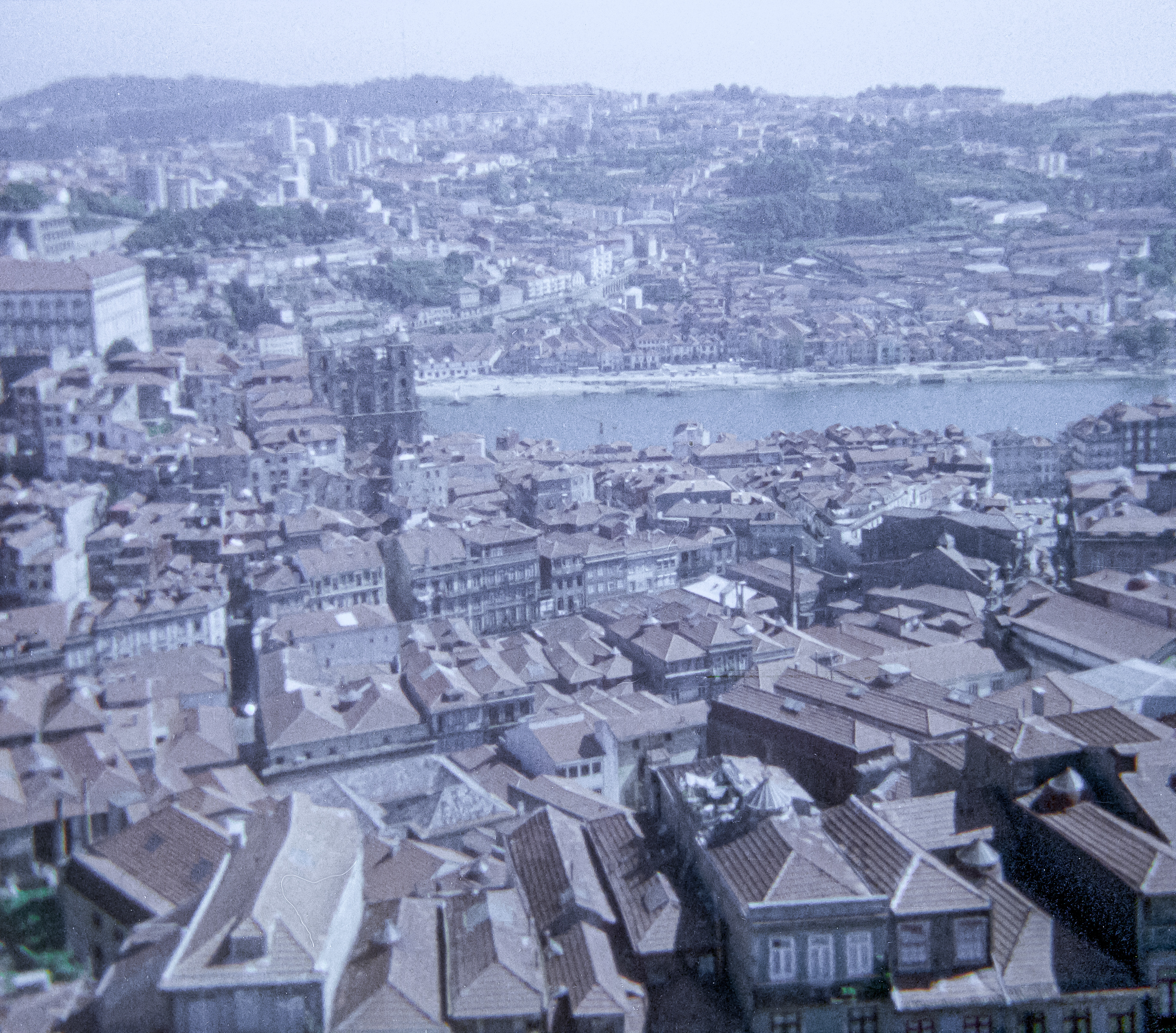
Porto cityscape view, August 1979.

Events in the year 1979 in Portugal.

== Incumbents ==
- President: António Ramalho Eanes
- Prime Minister: Carlos Mota Pinto (Independent) (until 1 August); Maria de Lourdes Pintasilgo (Independent) (from 1 August)

== Events ==
- 1 August - Establishment of the V Constitutional Government of Portugal.

== Culture ==
Portugal participated in the Eurovision Song Contest 1979 with Manuela Bravo and the song "Sobe, sobe, balão sobe".

== Sports ==
In association football, for the first-tier league seasons, see 1978–79 Primeira Divisão and 1979–80 Primeira Divisão.
