= 1768 in Portugal =

- Decades: 1740s; 1750s; 1760s; 1770s; 1780s
- See also: History of Portugal; Timeline of Portuguese history; List of years in Portugal

Events in the year 1768 in Portugal.

== Incumbents ==
- Monarch: Joseph I

== Births ==
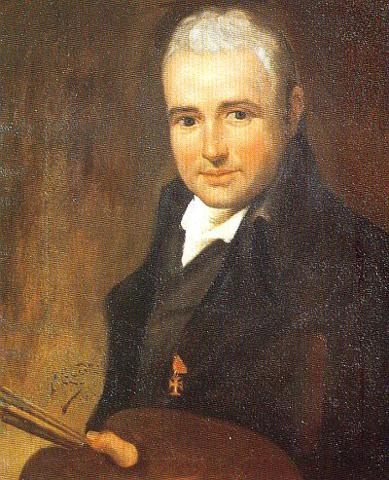
Domingos Sequeira (self portrait)

- 10 March – Domingos Sequeira, painter (d. 1837)
- 15 December – Infanta Mariana Victoria of Portugal, princess (d. 1788)

== Deaths ==
- 4 July – Paula de Odivelas, nun and royal mistress (b. 1701).
