= 1882 in Portugal =

- Centuries: 17th; 18th; 19th; 20th; 21st
- Decades: 1860s; 1870s; 1880s; 1890s; 1900s
- See also: List of years in Portugal

Events in the year 1882 in Portugal.

== Incumbents ==
- Monarch: Louis I
- Prime Minister: Fontes Pereira de Melo

== Births ==
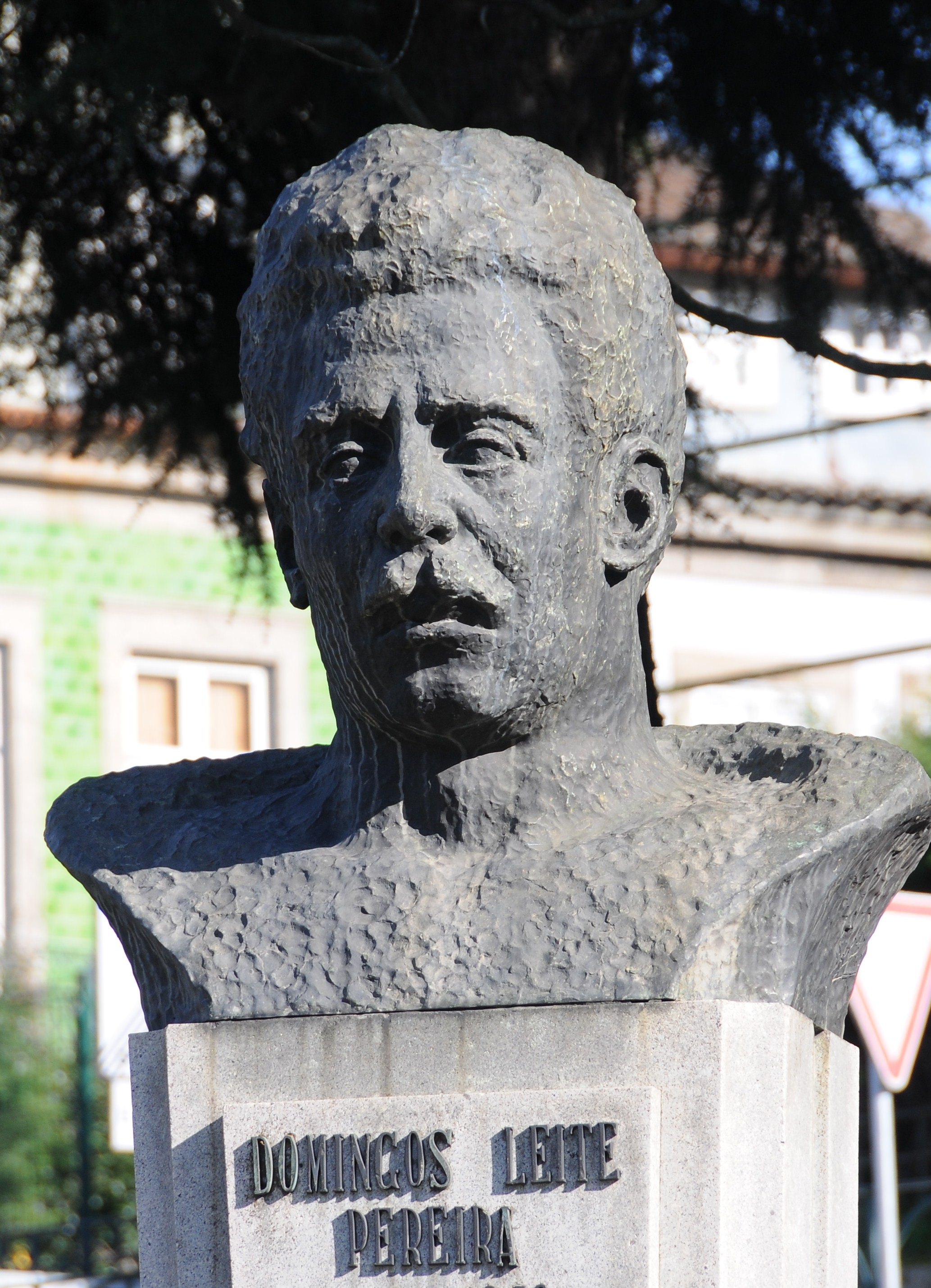
Bust of Domingos Leite Pereira, Prime Minister of Portugal

- 16 January – António dos Santos Graça, ethnologist (d. 1956).
- 28 June – Josué Francisco Trocado, composer (d. 1962)
- 19 September – Domingos Leite Pereira, politician (died 1956)
- 3 December – Alfredo Pimenta, historian and poet (d. 1950)

== Deaths ==
- António Rodrigues Sampaio, politician (born 1806)
