= 1510 in Portugal =

- Centuries: 15th; 16th; 17th; 18th
- Decades: 1490s; 1500s; 1510s; 1520s; 1530s
- See also: List of years in Portugal

Events in the year 1510 in Portugal.

== Incumbents ==
- King of Portugal and the Algarves: Manuel I

== Events ==
- Portuguese conquest of Goa

== Births ==
- Paulo Dias de Novais, Captain-Governor of Portuguese Angola (died 1589)
- Simão Rodrigues, Jesuit priest (died 1579)

== Deaths ==
- 1 March - Francisco de Almeida, nobleman, soldier and explorer (born c.1450)

== See also ==
- History of Portugal (1415–1578)
