= Duke of Goa =

Dukedom of Goa
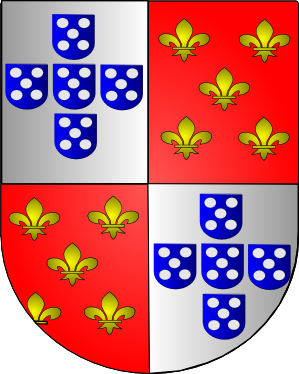
- Parent house: Vila Verde
- Country: Portugal
- Founded: 1515
- Founder: Afonso de Albuquerque
- Final ruler: Brás de Albuquerque
- Titles: Duke of Goa
- Deposition: 1581

The Duke of Goa (Portuguese: Duque de Goa; (Goan Konkani: Goemchô Duque) was the first Portuguese ducal title given outside the royal family, and the first Portuguese noble title to be granted to a Portuguese overseas territory, Goa.

== History ==
The title was bestowed upon Afonso de Albuquerque, the second Viceroy of India, by the Portuguese King Manuel I in 1515 as a reward for his outstanding service to the Portuguese Empire. This was the first ducal title granted outside the royal family and the first title that refers to land overseas. The Casa Ducal de Goa was the most important and richest of noble houses of its time in the sixteenth century, shortly behind the ducal houses on the Crown and the House of Braganza.

Having no legitimate children, Afonso de Albuquerque, before leaving for his term as governor in India, provided for the legitimacy of his only natural son Brás de Albuquerque, which was granted by the Crown in 1506. In India, he wrote to ask King Manuel I that all the honors for himself deserved to be granted to his son Brás de Albuquerque, instituting him as his sole heir. Before the death of Afonso de Albuquerque in 1515, the King showered honors and riches on Brás de Albuquerque, granting him the Duchy of Goa and the title of Dom, although determining that Brás would add Afonso to his baptismal name in honor of the former Viceroy.

The title and house would soon become extinct with Afonso's son, Brás de Albuquerque, who would die without male heirs. A law at the time, the Mental Law, meant that property of the crown could only be inherited by the first-born male heir.

== Title holders ==
1. D. Afonso de Albuquerque, the Great, Viceroy of India and 1st Duke of Goa (1450-1515)
2. D. Brás Afonso de Albuquerque, 2nd Duke of Goa (1501-1581)

== See also ==
- Dukedoms of Portugal
- Afonso de Albuquerque

== Bibliography ==
- "Nobreza de Portugal e do Brasil". Published by Zairol Lda., Lisbon 1989.
- Memórias de Africa e do Oriente (In Portuguese)
