= Dom Diogo de Sousa Museum of Archaeology =

Museum in Portugal

Coordinates: 41.5463°N 8.42747°W

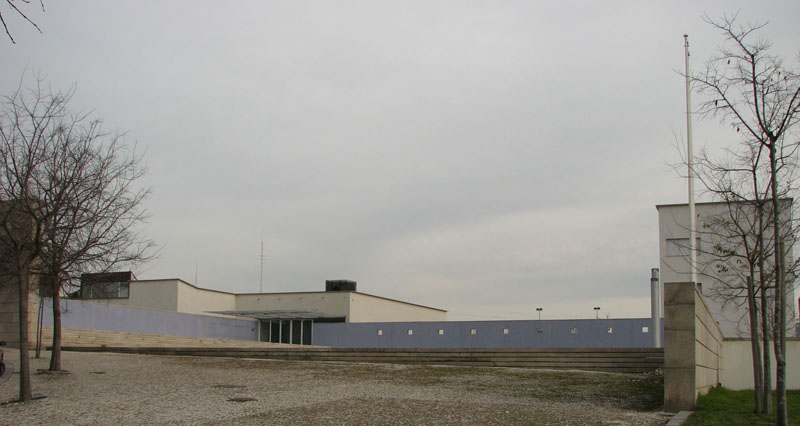

The D. Diogo de Sousa Museum is located in Braga, Portugal.

The Museum was founded in 1918 and moved to the new house in 2007 June 29.

The Museum is housed in a specially designed building in the center of what was the Roman City of Bracara Augusta.

Its collection mostly comprises items from excavations that took place in Braga with a vast chronological and cultural period, from the Palaeolithic to the Middle Ages.
