= Martinho =

Portuguese footballer (born 1926)

Personal information
- Full name: Carlos Martinho Gomes
- Date of birth: 18 October 1926
- Place of birth: Portugal
- Position: Forward

Senior career*
Years	Team	Apps	(Gls)
- Atlético

International career
1951	Portugal	2	(0)
- * Club domestic league appearances and goals

Carlos Martinho Gomes (born 18 October 1926) is a Portuguese former footballer who played as forward.

== See also ==
- Football in Portugal
