= 1816 in Brazil =

Events in the year 1816 in Brazil.

== Incumbents ==
- Monarch – Queen Mary I of Portugal (until 20 March); King John VI of Portugal (starting 20 March)

== Events ==
- In 1816, Brazil was still under Portuguese colonial rule as part of the United Kingdom of Portugal, Brazil, and the Algarves. This year is notably remembered for the arrival of the French Artistic Mission in Brazil.
- The French Artistic Mission arrived in Rio de Janeiro under the invitation of King John VI of Portugal. Led by artists like Jean-Baptiste Debret and Nicolas-Antoine Taunay, the mission aimed to establish European artistic and cultural standards in Brazil. This initiative later contributed to the founding of the Academia Imperial de Belas Artes, shaping Brazilian art and architecture and leaving a lasting cultural legacy.

== Deaths ==
=== March ===
- March 20 - Queen Mary I dies at the age of 81, leaving the throne to her 48-year-old son John VI.
