= De facto union in Portugal =

A de facto union in Portugal (Portuguese: união de facto; Mirandese: ounion de fato) is a legally recognized relationship which is granted similar rights to marriage, without formal registration.

As with a common-law marriage (which is sometimes called "marriage in fact"), the act of the couple representing themselves to others as being married, and organizing their relation as if they were married, acts as the evidence for the legal recognition as a de facto union. However, unlike a common-law marriage, the status is not equivalent to a marriage: the legal rights and obligations of a couple in a de facto union are different from those of a married couple.

== History ==
Laws regarding same-sex partnerships in Europe¹ Marriage Civil union Limited domestic recognition (cohabitation) Unrecognized Constitution limits marriage to opposite-sex couples ¹ May include recent laws or court decisions that have not yet entered into effect.

De facto unions were first formally introduced for opposite-sex couples in Law no. 135/99 of 1 July 1999, although some of the legal protections granted by the status already existed separately in various other laws, dating back to 1976. De facto unions were later extended to same-sex couples by Law no. 7/2001 of 11 May 2001. On the same day, a law on economia comum ("common economy") was also implemented, granting protection to two or more persons that live in common economy with most of the rights of the de facto union, except welfare benefits.

Since 5 June 2010, Portugal also recognizes same-sex marriage, with de facto unions remaining as an alternative to couples (same-sex or opposite-sex) who do not wish to marry.

== Establishment and termination ==
There is no registration for the process. Rights can be claimed after a couple lives together for two years. An application of joint tax assessment can be made to prove the union but it is not required.

Portuguese de facto unions terminate upon the death or marriage of one of the partners, or upon request of one of the partners.

== Rights ==
The law covers housing arrangements, civil servants and work benefits, the option to choose a fiscal regime as married partners, and welfare benefits. Since 1 March 2016, couples of any sex married or unmarried can adopt children together.

Since December 2006, same-sex couples (and opposite-sex couples) living in a de facto union are also recognized in the same way as married couples for citizenship applications and when a public servant wants to extend healthcare protection to the partner.

Since 2007, a new Penal Code recognizes same-sex couples regarding domestic violence, the murder of a partner, refusal to testify in court against the partner and in all other situations where married couples are referred in the code.

In July 2009, the Portuguese Assembly, with support of all the parties on the left, approved a bill to extend certain rights enjoyed by married couples, including inheritance rights, to couples in a de facto union. On 24 August 2009, President Aníbal Cavaco Silva vetoed the bill.

On 9 July 2010, a de facto union expansion law (that included inheritance rights, compensation and other benefits) passed the Portuguese Parliament and on 16 August 2010, President Cavaco Silva ratified the law.

== Statistics ==
In 2011, there were about 730,000 de facto unions in Portugal, a 276% increase from 20 years prior.

== See also ==
- Same-sex marriage in Portugal
- LGBT rights in Portugal
- Common-law marriage
- Civil union
- Domestic partnership
