= 1802 in Portugal =

- Centuries: 17th; 18th; 19th; 20th; 21st
- Decades: 1780s; 1790s; 1800s; 1810s; 1820s
- See also: List of years in Portugal

Events in the year 1802 in Portugal.

== Incumbents ==
- Monarch: Mary I

== Births ==
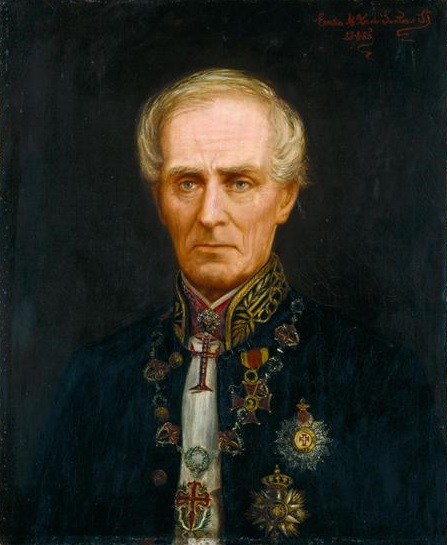
Manuel Inocêncio Liberato dos Santos

- 23 August – Manuel Inocêncio Liberato dos Santos, musician (died 1887).
- 26 October – Miguel I of Portugal, king (died 1866)
