= Maria Areosa =

Portuguese triathlete

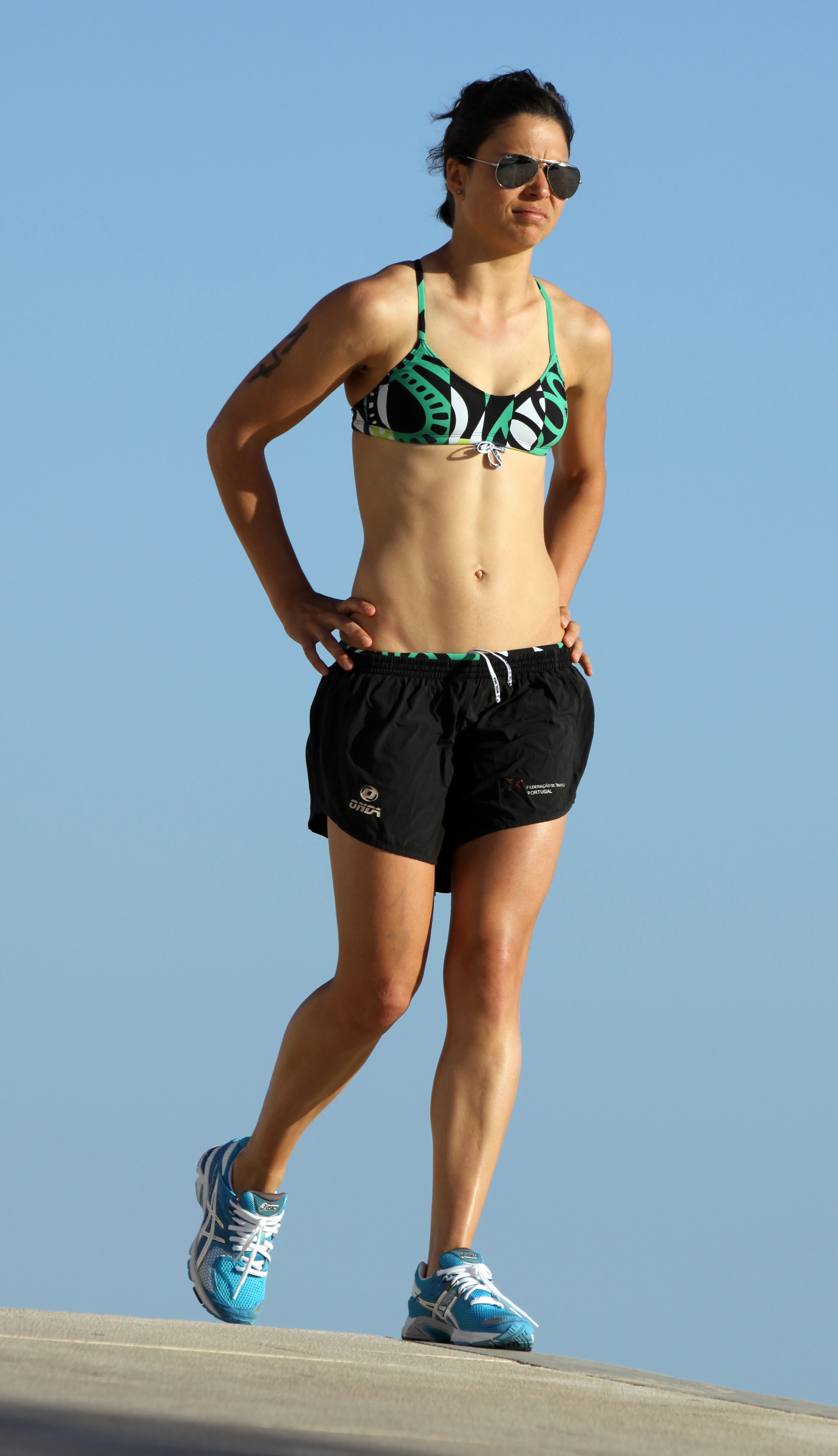
- Areosa in 2011

Personal information
- Nationality: Portuguese
- Born: Maria Costa Macedo Areosa Ribeiro; 14 September 1984 (age 41)
- Occupation: Triathlete
- Years active: 2001-2011

Sport
- Country: Portugal

Maria Areosa (born 14 September 1984) is a professional Portuguese triathlete, Portuguese duathlon champion of the year 2010, and permanent member of the national team.

In the official Portuguese ranking of the year 2010, Areosa is at the 14th position.

In 2010, Areosa also took part in the Portuguese triathlon of the XTERRA European Tour, placing 3rd at Figueira da Foz.

In Portugal, Maria Areosa represents the Clube Olímpico de Oeiras.

== ITU Competitions ==
In the eleven years from 2001 to 2011, Areosa took part in 32 ITU triathlons and achieved 12 top ten positions including two gold medals. In April 2011, Areosa opened her first season with a new top ten position in Quarteira. The following list is based upon the official ITU rankings and the ITU Athletes's Profile Page. Unless indicated otherwise, the following events are triathlons (Olympic Distance) and refer to the Elite category.

Date	Competition	Place	Rank
2001-06-23	European Championships (Junior)	Carlsbad (Karlovy Vary)	22
2002-07-06	European Championships (Junior)	Győr	16
2002-08-31	European Cup	Praia de Vitoria	6
2002-09-07	European Cup	Madrid	14
2002-10-13	World Cup	Madeira	30
2002-10-23	European Cup	Alanya	1
2003-04-26	World Cup	St Anthonys	46
2003-07-20	European Cup	Győr	6
2003-08-30	European Cup	Sofia	1
2003-09-14	European Cup	Estoril	4
2003-09-21	World Cup	Madrid	16
2003-11-02	World Cup	Cancun	10
2003-11-09	World Cup	Rio de Janeiro	10
2004-02-28	African Cup	Bloemfontein	7
2004-04-11	World Cup	Ishigaki	34
2004-04-18	European Championships	Valencia	17
2004-04-25	World Cup	Mazatlan	27
2004-05-09	World Championships	Madeira	55
2004-09-19	World Cup	Madrid	DNF
2004-11-07	World Cup	Rio de Janeiro	17
2005-06-05	World Cup	Madrid	DNS
2008-10-26	Premium European Cup	Alanya	4
2009-04-05	European Cup	Quarteira	DNF
2010-04-11	European Cup	Quarteira	15
2010-04-30	Duathlon European Championships	Nancy	DNS
2010-06-05	Dextro Energy World Championship Series	Madrid	54
2010-06-12	Premium European Cup	Pontevedra	9
2010-07-03	European Championships	Athlone	28
2010-07-10	World Cup	Holten	34
2010-08-22	Asian Cup	Incheon	DNF
2010-09-08	Dextro Energy World Championship Series	Budapest	54
2010-09-26	Pan American Cup and Iberoamerican Championships	Guatape	6
2010-10-10	World Cup	Huatulco	22
2011-04-09	European Cup	Quarteira	10
2011-05-08	World Cup	Monterrey	47
2011-05-29	Premium European Cup	Brasschaat	10
2011-06-25	European Championships	Pontevedra	26
2011-07-31	Premium European Cup	Banyoles	10
