= LGBTQ rights in Portugal =

- Location of Portugal (dark green) – in Europe (light green & dark grey) – in the European Union (light green) – [Legend]
- Legal status: Legal since 1982; age of consent equalized in 2007
- Military: Gays, lesbians and bisexuals allowed to serve openly
- Discrimination protections: Sexual orientation and gender identity protections (see below)

Family rights
- Recognition of relationships: De facto union since 2001, Same-sex marriage since 2010
- Adoption: Full adoption rights since 2016

Lesbian, gay, bisexual, transgender, and queer (LGBTQ) rights in Portugal are among the most advanced in the world, having improved substantially in the 21st century. After a long period of oppression during the Estado Novo, Portuguese society has become increasingly accepting of homosexuality, which was decriminalized in 1982, eight years after the Carnation Revolution. Portugal has wide-ranging anti-discrimination laws and is one of the few countries in the world to contain a ban on discrimination based on sexual orientation in its Constitution. On 5 June 2010, the state became the eighth in the world to recognize same-sex marriage. On 1 March 2011, a gender identity law, said to be one of the most advanced in the world, was passed to simplify the process of sex and name change for transgender people. Same-sex couples have been permitted to adopt since 1 March 2016.

The country, while still influenced by Roman Catholicism, has progressively become more accepting of same-sex relationships and homosexuality. The 2019 Eurobarometer opinion survey showed that 74% of the Portuguese population supported same-sex marriage and that around 80% believed lesbian, gay and bisexual people should enjoy the same rights as heterosexuals. Lisbon, Porto and Faro have visible LGBT scenes, with several gay bars, nightclubs and other venues, as well as their annual pride parades.

== Legality of same-sex sexual activity ==
During the period of the Portuguese Inquisition, female homosexual activity was not actively prosecuted due to a 1645 ruling; one of the few cases of prosecuting a woman (Maria Duran) for same-sex sexual activity came in 1741, but she was prosecuted for causing distress to her sexual partners, not for her activity. Same-sex sexual activity was first decriminalized in 1852, under Maria II and Ferdinand II of the Kingdom of Portugal, but it was made a crime again in 1886, under Luís I, and Portugal gradually became more oppressive of homosexuals until and throughout the dictatorship years. It was not until 1982 that same-sex sexual activity was decriminalized again, and the age of consent was equalized with heterosexual activity in 2007.

== Recognition of same-sex relationships ==
Portugal has recognized unregistered cohabitation since 5 May 2001, and same-sex marriage since 5 June 2010. Same-sex marriage was legalized under the second term of the Sócrates Socialist Government, and passed the Portuguese Parliament with the support of other left-wing parties. Same-sex married couples are granted all of the rights of opposite-sex married couples. The Penal Code was amended in 2007 to equalize the age of consent and to criminalize domestic violence in same-sex relationships, thus equalizing treatment with opposite-sex couples.

== Adoption and family planning ==
Since 2016, Portuguese law has allowed adoption of children by same-sex couples. Prior to that reform, same-sex couples were barred from adopting and informally forbidden from fostering children, although there had been several court rulings allowing children to live with same-sex families.

In the past, Portugal had been forced to pay a fine due to homophobic statements from a court that ruled against a gay father's right for his daughter's custody. The European Court of Human Rights received the case and ruled in favour of the father in 1999, ordering the custody back to him and issuing a penalty for the country.

On 17 May 2013, Parliament rejected a bill allowing same-sex couples to adopt children, in a 104–77 vote. On the same day, Parliament approved a bill, in its first reading, allowing same-sex married couples to adopt their partner's children (i.e. stepchild adoption). However, that bill was rejected in its second reading on 14 March 2014, in a 107–112 vote. Other bills granting adoption rights to same-sex parents and carers, as well as in vitro fertilisation (IVF) for lesbian relationships, were introduced in Parliament by the opposition Socialist and Left Bloc parties on 16 January 2015. On 22 January, Parliament rejected the proposals.

On 23 September 2015, parties from the Left majority in Parliament submitted bills to grant same-sex couples full adoption rights as well as access to IVF. On 20 November 2015, five proposals regarding adoption rights were approved by Parliament in their first readings. The bills were then moved to the Constitutional Affairs, Rights, Freedoms and Guarantees Committee, where they were merged into one project and approved on 16 December 2015. On 18 December 2015, the bill was approved by Parliament. On 25 January 2016, one day after the presidential election, outgoing President Aníbal Cavaco Silva vetoed the adoption bill. The Left majority in Parliament announced their intention to override the veto. On 10 February 2016, the veto was overturned by Parliament. The President begrudgingly signed the bill into law on 19 February 2016. The law was published in the official journal on 29 February, and took effect the first day of the first month after its publication (i.e. 1 March 2016).

On 13 May 2016, Parliament adopted a bill to grant female same-sex couples access to medically assisted reproduction. It was signed into law by President Marcelo Rebelo de Sousa on 7 June. The law was published in the official journal on 20 June and took effect the first day of the second month after publication (i.e. 1 August 2016).

Surrogacy was explicitly banned under a law adopted in 2006. In 2016, the Portuguese Parliament passed a law allowing gestational surrogacy under limited circumstances, such as when a woman is born without a uterus or has a serious illness that affects her uterus. Surrogacy, under any of its forms, is still illegal for same-sex couples.

== Discrimination protections and hate crime laws ==
In 2003, laws against discrimination based on sexual orientation in employment came into effect concerning three particular measures: access to work and employment, protection against discrimination in work and against sexual harassment. Since 2004, the Constitution of Portugal has prohibited any form of discrimination based on sexual orientation, making Portugal one of the only countries in the world to enshrine a ban on discrimination based on sexual orientation in its Constitution. A new Penal Code came into force in 2007, strengthening the anti-discrimination legislation much further. The Penal Code contains several provisions that relate to sexual orientation in three aspects: recognition of same-sex relationships through protection in the same means as to different-sex relationships, such as against domestic violence and murder; equal age of consent between same-sex and opposite-sex relationships; and sexual orientation being considered an aggravating circumstance in homicide and hate crime cases. Article 13 of the Portuguese Constitution reads as follows:

No one may be privileged, favoured, prejudiced, deprived of any right or exempted from any duty for reasons of ancestry, sex, race, language, territory of origin, religion, political or ideological beliefs, education, economic situation, social circumstances or sexual orientation.

In 2013, the Portuguese Parliament passed a law adding gender identity to the hate crimes provision in the Penal Code. On 19 January 2015, the Portuguese Parliament voted for the inclusion of gender identity as a protected ground of discrimination in the field of employment.

In 2015, the Portuguese Parliament unanimously approved a measure to formally adopt 17 May as the "National Day Against Homophobia and Transphobia". In doing so, the Parliament committed to "engage in fulfilling national and international commitments to combat homophobic and transphobic discrimination".

In 2020, ILGA Portugal recorded 41 cases of discrimination directed at LGBT people and 48 instances of hate crimes. In December 2020, the Court of Arbitration for Sport fined the Portuguese Football Federation €1,000 and ordered them to play four games behind closed doors (each game behind closed doors costing between €10,000 and €25,000) for homophobic insults hurled by fans during a match in October 2018. A survey from December 2020 showed that 79% of young people had witnessed incidents of anti-LGBT bullying and 86% thought that schools should better address LGBT topics.

== Transgender and intersex rights ==
Discrimination against transgender and intersex people is illegal in Portugal.

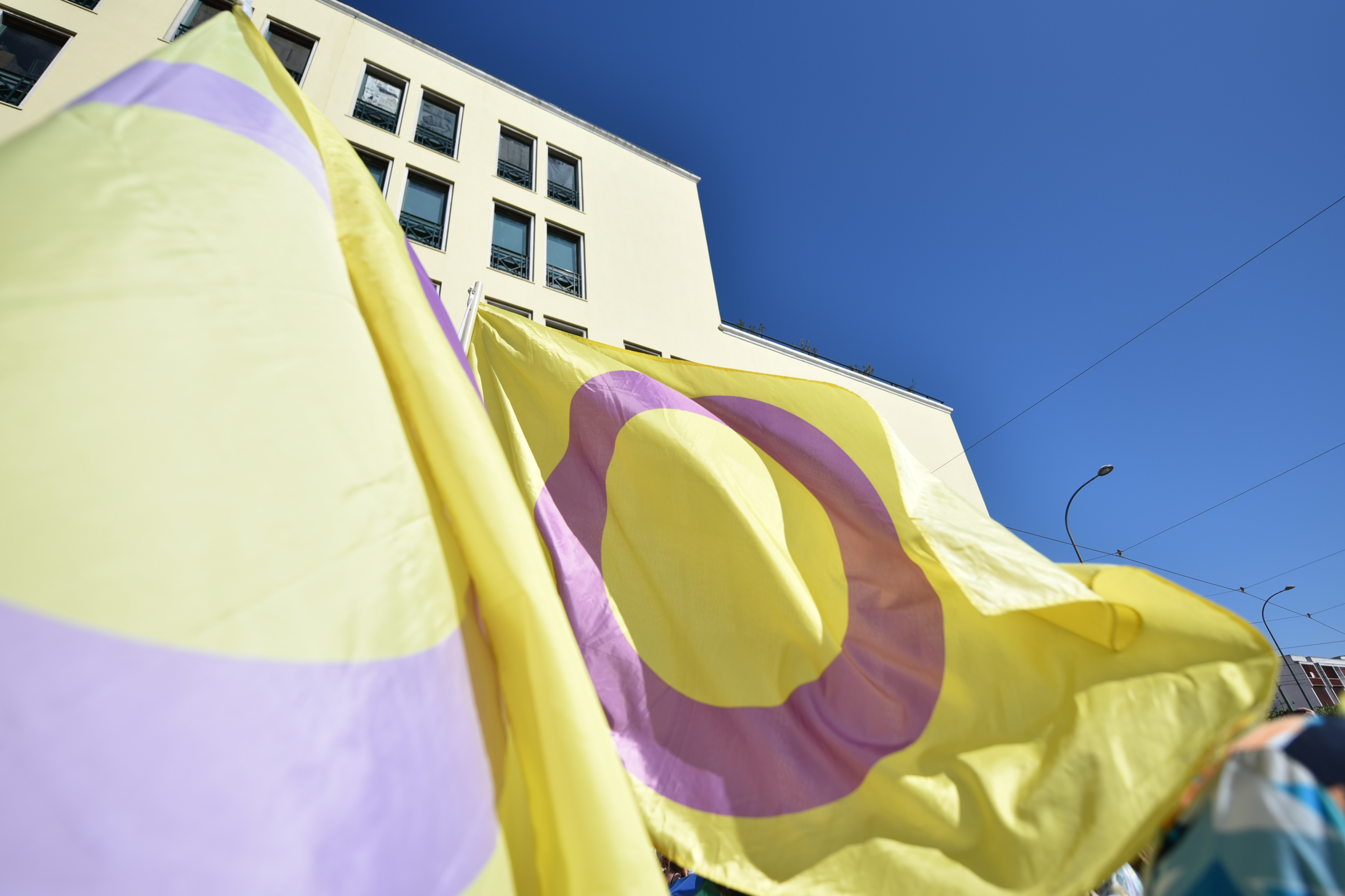
Intersex pride flag in Lisbon, 2023

In March 2011, President Aníbal Cavaco Silva ratified the new Law of Gender Identity (Portuguese: Lei da Identidade de Género), which allows transgender persons to change their legal gender on birth certificates and other identity documents.

On 24 May 2016, the Left Bloc introduced a bill to allow legal gender change solely based on self-determination. Similar bills were introduced by the People–Animals–Nature party and the Costa Government in November 2016 and May 2017, respectively. They were merged into one measure by a parliamentary committee and subsequently approved by the Parliament on 13 April 2018. On 9 May, President Marcelo Rebelo de Sousa vetoed the bill. On 12 July, the Parliament adopted the bill with changes with regards to sex changes by minors aged 16 and 17, suggested by the President in his veto message. This time around, the President signed the bill on 31 July. It was published in the official journal on 7 August 2018 and took effect the following day.

The law (Act No. 38/2018) allows an adult person to change their legal gender without any requirements. Minors aged 16 and 17 are able to do so with parental consent and a psychological opinion, confirming that their decision has been taken freely and without any outside pressure. The law also prohibits both direct and indirect discrimination based on gender identity, gender expression and sex characteristics, and bans non-consensual sex assignment treatment and surgical intervention on intersex children. By October 2018, a total of 274 people, including 21 minors, had used the new gender recognition law to change their legal gender. The law has been cited by the UN Human Rights Council as a model piece of legislation.

In July 2019, the Minister of Science, Technology and Higher Education, Manuel Heitor, issued recommendations for universities to amend the certificates of transgender people to properly reflect their gender identity. Similarly, that same month, Education Minister Tiago Brandão Rodrigues published regulations for primary and secondary schools to facilitate transgender and intersex students. This includes using the student's preferred name, raising awareness, and training staff to handle discrimination cases and bullying.

On 20 March 2026, the Portuguese Assembly approved the first preliminary reading of three draft anti-trans bills by a vote of 151–79, with the right wing parties PSD, Chega, and CDS-PP voting in favor and all other parties in the assembly (PS, Liberal Initiative, LIVRE, PCP, the Left Bloc, PAN, and JPP) voting against it. The bills, which were introduced by the PSD, Chega, and CDS-PP parties, seek to repeal Act No. 38/2018, remove self-identification for trans people, force trans people to get medical diagnoses for name and gender changes, ban gender-affirming care for minors, re-legalize non-consensual surgery on intersex children, ban trans and nonbinary minors from changing their name or gender marker on official documents and ban the inclusion of "gender ideology" in school curricula.

The bills received widespread criticism from legal experts, medical professionals, and advocacy groups and were compared to recent bills restricting LGBTQ+ rights in Russia and Hungary. Legal experts expressed concerns that the bills were not only unconstitutional, but may also violate European Union and United Nations policies. Meanwhile, Outright International and other international organizations united with over 70 Portuguese organizations to oppose the bills and hundreds of people protested outside the Assembly during the preliminary vote on March 20. Additionally, national medical organizations including the Portuguese Society of Clinical Sexology, the National Association of Medical Students, the Portuguese Medical Association and the Portuguese Order of Psychologists released statements opposing the bills, in addition to over 50 health professionals and academics who criticized the poor scientific rigor used to support the proposals. Two days before the debate, six European LGBTI organisations — IGLYO, ILGA-Europe, OII Europe, TGEU, EL*C and Bi+ Equal — issued a joint statement urging deputies to reject the bills in full, describing them as a serious attack on the rights, dignity, safety and bodily autonomy of trans and intersex people and warning that Portugal would fall at least four places on ILGA-Europe's Rainbow Map ranking, below Sweden, the Netherlands, Ireland and France, if the measures became law. The signatories argued that removing the 2018 protections for intersex children from non-consensual, medically unnecessary interventions would make Portugal the first country to actively regress on intersex rights, coming less than six months after it voted to adopt the Committee of Ministers recommendation on equal rights for intersex persons, and placed the bills in the context of similar campaigns in Bulgaria, Slovakia and Hungary that invoke biological sex, family protection and child protection to justify rolling back rights.

Following the preliminary vote on March 20, the Left Bloc formally petitioned Volker Türk, the United Nations' top human rights official, to weigh in on whether the bills would breach Portugal's treaty commitments. The bills then went to specialized parliamentary committees for expert testimony and potential amendments before returning to the full Assembly for a final vote. If passed again, the bills will then be sent to the president for approval.

On 25 August 2026, Türk replied in a letter to the President of the Assembly, José Pedro Aguiar-Branco, which was reported the following day by Público. He asked the three parties to withdraw the bills or, failing that, to revise them through transparent and inclusive consultations so as to bring them into line with international human rights standards, warning that as drafted they could negatively affect the exercise of rights enshrined in treaties ratified by Portugal, among them the International Covenant on Civil and Political Rights, the International Covenant on Economic, Social and Cultural Rights, the Convention on the Elimination of All Forms of Discrimination Against Women and the Convention on the Rights of the Child. The High Commissioner's office argued that legal gender recognition should rest on self-determination through a simple administrative procedure that does not oblige applicants to produce medical certification, and concluded that the bills risked re-pathologising gender identity and adversely affecting transgender people's rights to privacy, autonomy and self-determination, as well as running counter to recommendations issued by United Nations human rights mechanisms. It also criticised Chega's use of the term "gender identity disorder", which it said could contribute to stigmatising trans people, and warned that the CDS-PP proposal to prohibit hormone treatment and puberty blockers for all minors regardless of age raised concerns over the right to health and to non-discrimination and over the child's right to be heard and to have their best interests treated as a primary consideration.

Both Chega and CDS-PP rejected the appeal on the day it was reported. Party leader André Ventura wrote on X that Chega considered its bill entirely reasonable and would not withdraw it, adding that it was not for the United Nations to decide what the Portuguese Parliament approves. The CDS-PP parliamentary leader, Paulo Núncio, said his party would maintain its bill in full and described the High Commissioner's request as an unjustifiable interference in the Portuguese legislative process. The PSD, whose deputies had voted for all three bills, declined to comment, while the Left Bloc's Fabian Figueiredo publicly urged the PSD to drop its bill and to legislate on the basis of science rather than follow the culture-war agenda of the far right, saying the party had to decide whether it wished to place Portugal among those countries that are rolling back human rights.

== Military service ==
Portugal allows all citizens to serve openly in the Armed Forces regardless of sexual orientation, as the Constitution explicitly forbids any discrimination on that basis. Lesbian, gay and bisexual people are therefore able to serve in the military on the same basis as heterosexual men and women. A ban on transgender/nonbinary people and people living with HIV serving in the military was lifted with new regulations that came into effect in 2024.

In April 2016, Portugal's armed forces chief General Carlos Jerónimo resigned, days after being summoned to explain comments about gay soldiers made by the deputy head of the military college. President Marcelo Rebelo de Sousa accepted the resignation of Jerónimo, who took up the post of chief of staff in 2014. The resignation came after António Grilo, deputy head of the military college, admitted advising parents of young military students in the Portuguese army to withdraw their sons if they were gay "to protect them from the other students". Defence Minister Azeredo Lopes considered any discrimination "absolutely unacceptable".

== Conversion therapy ==
Reports from 10 January 2019 suggested that several psychologists were performing conversion therapy. A few days later, a total of 250 psychologists submitted an open letter to the regulatory Ordem dos Psicólogos demanding an investigation into these pseudoscientific practices. The body affirmed that conversion therapy is malpractice and cannot be justified.

On 22 December 2023, Parliament passed a bill criminalizing conversion therapy with penalties ranging from three to five years for the most aggravated cases. The new law took effect on 1 March 2024.

== Asylum recognition ==
Since 30 August 2008, sexual orientation and gender identity have been recognized as grounds to apply for asylum.

== Blood donation ==
In 2010, Parliament unanimously approved a Left Bloc petition to allow gay and bisexual men to donate blood. The motion was to finally be implemented by the Portuguese Institute of Blood and Transplantation (Instituto Português do Sangue e da Transplantação) in October 2015, and a six-month or one-year deferral period was to be enacted. However, the motion's implementation was delayed. In late September 2016, the new rules came into effect and allow gay and bisexual men to donate blood after one year of abstinence from sex.

In March 2021, in response to controversy in the country after several donations were rejected, the Portuguese Institute of Blood and Transplantation published new guidelines removing all barriers to men who have sex with men from donating blood.

Since 15 December 2021 is the discrimination based on the sexual orientation, sexual identity and gender expression not allowed, allowing these groups to donate blood.

== Living conditions ==
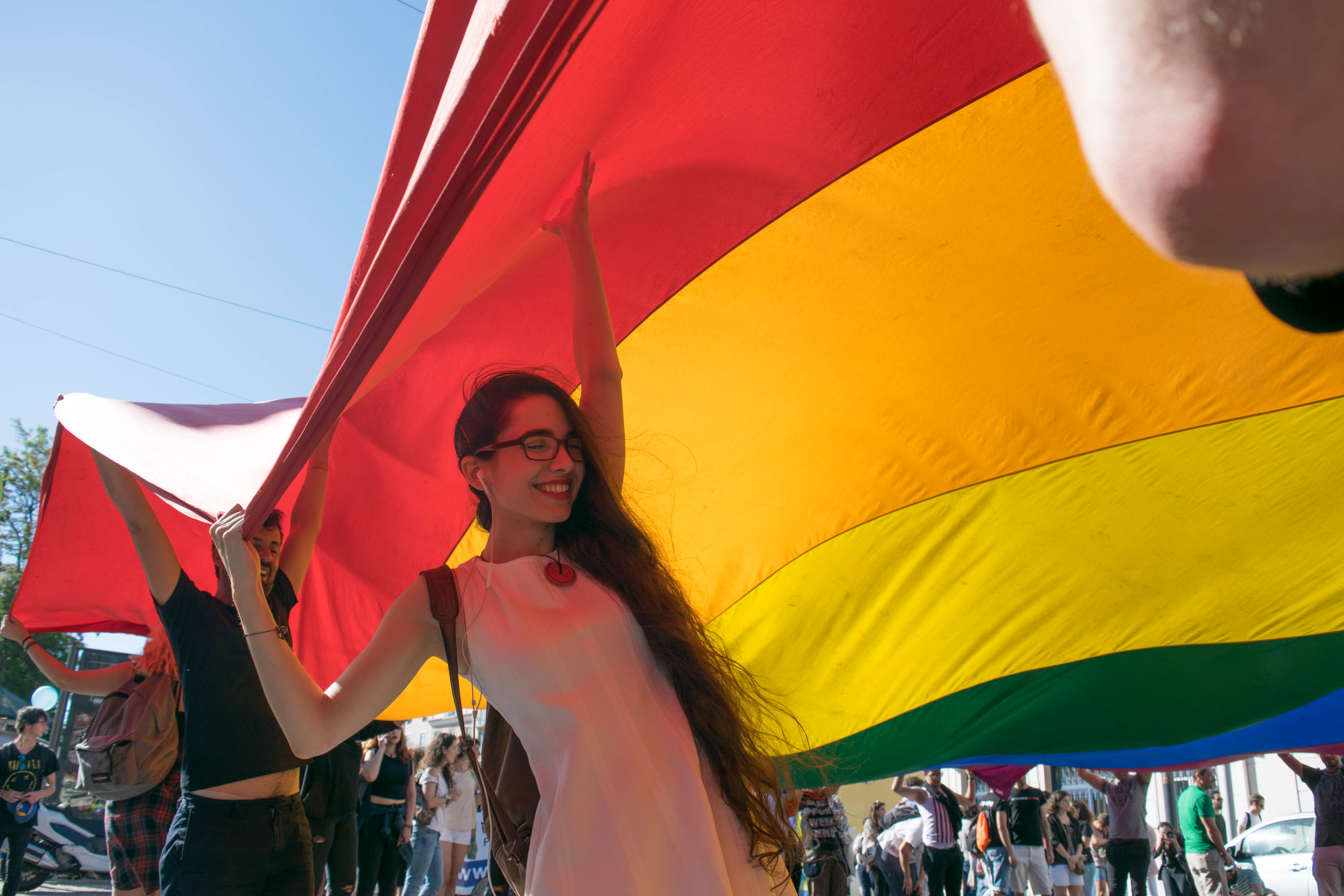
Gay Pride in Lisbon

Although there are several cases of public prejudice against LGBT people, there is a dynamic gay scene in Lisbon, Porto and in the main touristic cities in the Algarve region, such as Faro, Lagos, Albufeira and Tavira, with several gay bars, pubs, nightclubs and beaches. Other smaller cities and regions such as Aveiro, Leiria, Coimbra, Braga, Évora and Madeira have more discreet gay communities. In Lisbon, most LGBT-oriented businesses are grouped around the bohemian Bairro Alto and the adjacent Príncipe Real and Chiado neighbourhoods. In both Lisbon and Porto, there are also annual pride parades that attract thousands of participants and spectators. Lisbon is also host to one of the largest LGBT film festivals in Europe – Queer Lisboa – the Lisbon Gay & Lesbian Film Festival. Some Portuguese beaches are popular among LGBT people, like 19 Beach, near Costa de Caparica, and Barril Naturist Beach (an official naturist beach) or Cacela Velha beach, both of them near Tavira.

Portugal is frequently referred to as one of the world's most LGBT-friendly countries, with various groups and associations catering to LGBT people, supportive legislation and high societal acceptance. In 1974, Portugal transitioned from an authoritarian clerical fascist dictatorship to a civilian democracy. During the dictatorship, LGBT people faced oppression at the hands of the state, as well as prejudice and rejection at the hands of society. Since the transition, however, LGBT people, as well as Portuguese people more broadly, have experienced an increased level of rights, freedom and liberty. Over the following years, LGBT individuals began to organize politically and slowly enter the public eye, raising awareness of their cause and movement. Associação ILGA Portugal was founded in 1995, campaigning for increased legal rights for LGBT people, outlawing discrimination on account of sexual orientation and gender identity and changing societal perceptions. Numerous other groups were established, including Portugal Pride, AMPLOS (Associação de Mães e Pais pela Liberdade de Orientação Sexual) and Pink Panthers (Panteras Rosa), along with a motorcycle group for LGBT people in Porto and an LGBT Catholic association in Lisbon. Owing to their advocacy and work, anti-discrimination laws were expanded to include sexual orientation and gender identity, article 13 of the Constitution of Portugal was similarly amended to prohibit discrimination based on sexual orientation, transgender transition laws were relaxed and civil unions were opened to same-sex couples. In 2010, Portugal legalized same-sex marriage, the eighth country worldwide to do so and the sixth in Europe, and in 2016 same-sex couples became eligible to legally adopt. In 2019, ILGA-Europe ranked Portugal 7th out of 49 European countries in relation to LGBT rights legislation. In March 2019, the country was named the world's best LGBT-friendly travel destination, along with Canada and Sweden.

== Public opinion ==
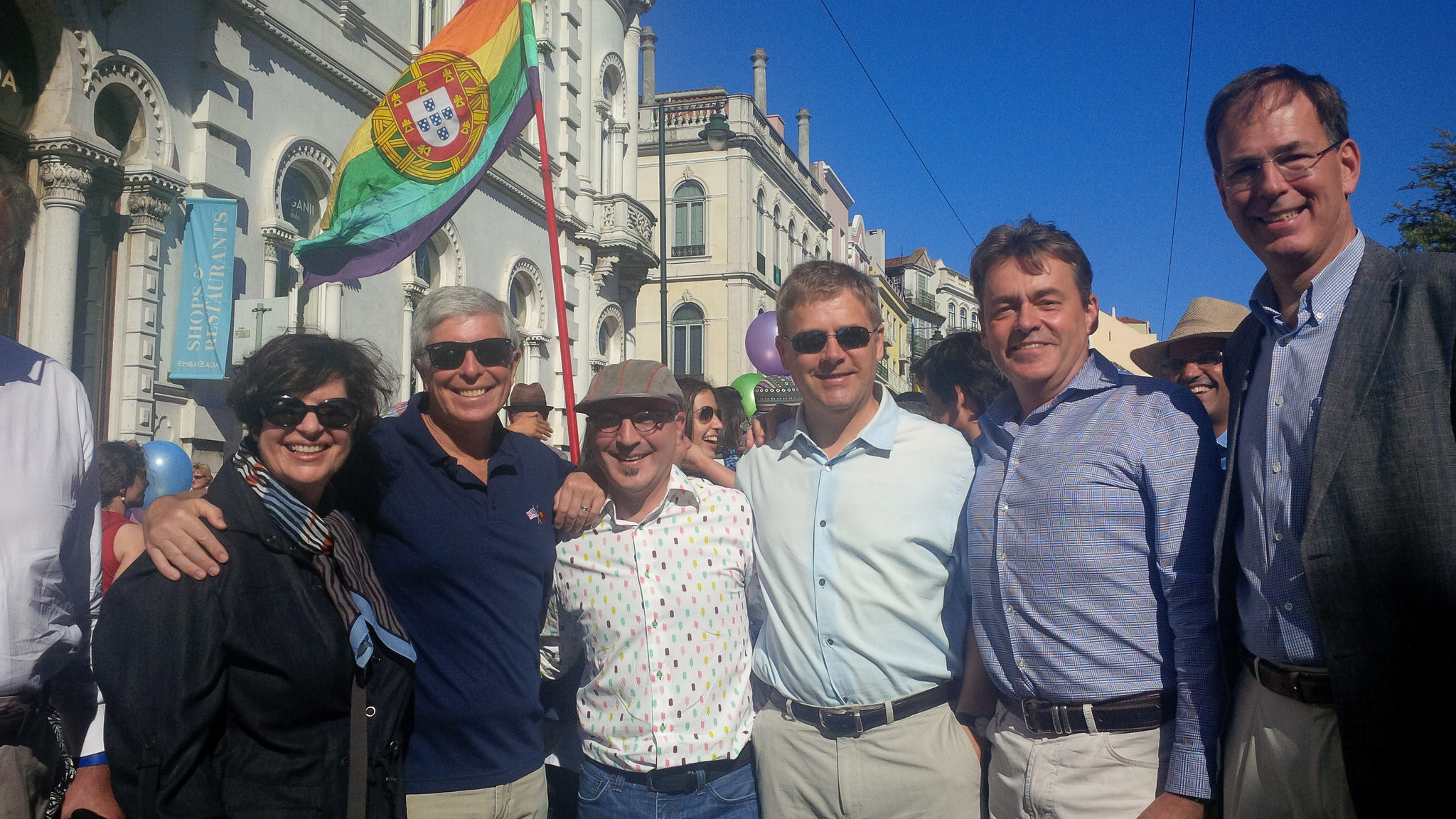
From left, Israeli Ambassador Tzipora Rimon, U.S. Ambassador Robert Sherman, Canadian Ambassador Jeffrey Marder, Danish Ambassador Michael Suhr, Belgian Ambassador Boudewijn Dereymaerker and Dutch Ambassador Govert de Vroe attending the 2016 LGBTI Pride parade in Lisbon

A Eurobarometer survey published in late 2006 showed that only 29% of Portuguese surveyed supported same-sex marriage and 19% supported the right of same-sex couples to adopt (EU-wide average 44% and 33%).

Opinions on same-sex marriage have considerably changed since then. A 2009 survey by the Catholic University of Portugal revealed that 42% of respondents were in favour of same-sex marriage and another survey by Eurosondagem, Rádio Renascença, SIC TV, and the Expresso newspaper stated that about 52% of the Portuguese public were in favour of same-sex marriages. An Angus Reid poll on 11 January 2010 showed that 45.5% of those polled were in support of same-sex marriage, but this was less than the 49.3% that opposed. A Eurobarometer survey published in 2015 showed that support for same-sex marriage had risen significantly to 61%.

Views on adoption had not been changed significantly at the time same-sex marriage was passed into law: only 21.7% favored adoption, while 68.4% opposed allowing same-sex couples to adopt. However, in 2014, during parliamentary debates on an initiative to legalize stepchild adoption for same-sex couples, polls showed that a majority of the Portuguese population supported both stepchild adoption and full adoption rights.

A 2020 study found that same-sex couples face significant discrimination in the housing markets of Porto and Lisbon. In similar quality applications for rentals, male same-sex couples received 23 to 26 percent less positive replies than opposite-sex couples, while for female same-sex couples this difference was 10 percent.

=== Eurobarometer ===
Below is the share of respondents in Portugal who agreed with the following statements in the 2006, 2015 and 2019 Special Eurobarometer on discrimination. The last column is the change from the previous Eurobarometer. In 2006, respondents were presented with the slightly different statement "Homosexual marriages should be allowed throughout Europe".

The 2023 Eurobarometer found that 81% of Portuguese people thought same-sex marriage should be allowed throughout Europe, and 73% agreed that "there is nothing wrong in a sexual relationship between two persons of the same sex".

Year	"Gay and lesbian people should have the same rights as heterosexual people"	"There is nothing wrong in a sexual relationship between two persons of the same sex"	"Same-sex marriages should be allowed throughout Europe"	Change from last statement
2006	—N/a	—N/a	29%	—N/a
2015	71%	59%	61%	+32
2019	78%	69%	74%	+13
2023	79%	73%	81%	+7

== Summary table ==
Same-sex sexual activity legal	Yes (Since 1982)
Equal age of consent (14)	Yes (Since 2007)
Anti-discrimination laws in employment	Yes (Since 2003)
Anti-discrimination laws in all other areas	Yes (Since 2004)
Hate crime laws covering sexual orientation	Yes (Since 2007)
Hate crime laws covering gender identity	Yes (Since 2013)
Same-sex marriage	Yes (Since 2010)
Recognition of same-sex unions	Yes (Since 2001)
Stepchild adoption by same-sex couples	Yes (Since 2016)
Joint adoption by same-sex couples	Yes (Since 2016)
LGB people allowed to serve in the military	Yes (Since 1999)
Transgender people allowed to serve openly in the military	Yes (Since 2023)
Right to change legal gender	Yes
Right to change legal gender without SRS or forced sterilization	Yes
Right to change legal gender by self-determination	Yes (Since 2018)
Legal recognition of non-binary gender	No
Legal recognition of intersex people	Yes
Intersex minors protected from invasive surgical procedures	Yes (Since 2018)
Sexual orientation/gender identity for asylum recognition	Yes (Since 2008)
Access to artificial insemination/IVF for lesbian couples	Yes (Since 2016)
Conversion therapy banned on minors	Yes (Since 2024)
Automatic parenthood for both spouses after birth	Yes (Since 2016)
Commercial surrogacy for gay male couples	No (Banned regardless of sexual orientation)
MSMs allowed to donate blood	Yes (Since 2021)

== See also ==
- LGBTQ history in Portugal
- Politics of Portugal
- LGBTQ rights in Europe
- LGBTQ rights in the European Union
