= José Rodrigues Maio =

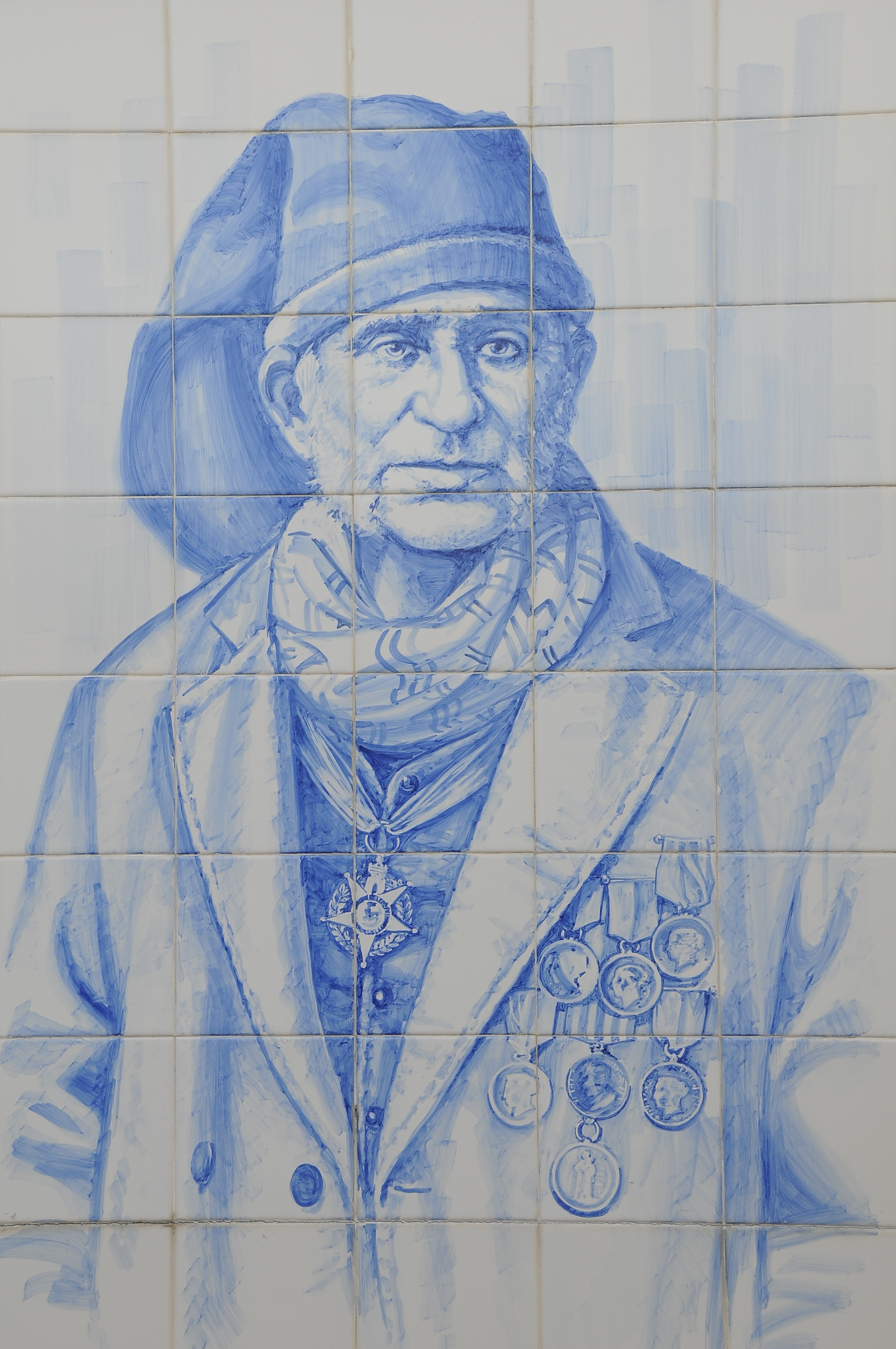
- Picture of José Rodrigues Maio in azulejo, Póvoa do Varzim
- Born: 8 October 1817; Póvoa do Varzim, Portugal
- Died: 13 November 1884 (aged 67); Póvoa do Varzim, Portugal
- Occupations: Lifeguard and fisherman
- Known for: Saving people from the sea

José Rodrigues Maio, more commonly known as Cego do Maio CvTE (8 October 1817 – 13 November 1884) was a Portuguese hero, lifeguard and fisherman from Póvoa de Varzim.

He was awarded the highest honour of the State, the Collar of Knight of the Order of the Tower and Sword and the Gold medal of the Royal Humanitarian Society of Porto, placed personally by King Louis I for the lives that he saved in the sea of Póvoa de Varzim.
