= Ignácio Barbosa-Machado =

Portuguese historian

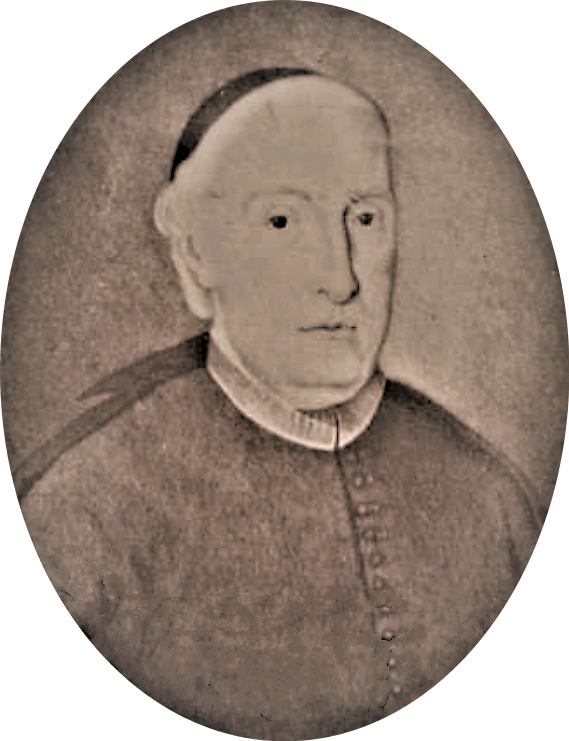
Inácio Barbosa Machado

Ignácio Barbosa-Machado (23 November 1686 in Lisbon – 28 March 1734 in Lisbon) was a Portuguese historian prominent in the early history of Portugal and Brazil.

Barbosa-Machado was born in Lisbon. He studied at University of Coimbra, and was sent to the Portuguese colony of Brazil as a magistrate. He joined the church after the death of his wife. His brother was Diogo Barbosa Machado.

== Bibliography (part) ==
- "Fastos Politicos e Militares de Antiqua e Nova Lusitania" (Lisbon, 1745), dealing with the history of Portugal and Brazil.
