= José Homem Correia Teles =

Portuguese jurist, judge and politician

José Homem Correia Teles (May 10, 1780 – July 3, 1849) was a Portuguese jurist, judge and politician.

He studied canon law in Coimbra from 1795 to 1800 and learned the profession of advocate from his father. From 1803 on, he held judicial posts in the countryside and, in 1821–24, in Lisbon. Besides practicing law in Lisbon, he was a member of the Portuguese parliament several times between 1820 and 1843, and participated in drafting the Portuguese civil code in 1827/28.

The writings of Correia Teles reflect and continue the 18th century's process of legal codification. His principal work of 1826, Digesto portuguez, appearing 1835 in three volumes, presented a homogeneous view of Portuguese law, even though it relied on foreign codes such as the Code Napoléon. His other works include O Manual de Tabelião, Manual de Processo Civil, O Código Civil, O Direito Português and Theoria da Interpretação das Leis e Ensaio sobre o Censo Consignativo.
