= 1855 in Portugal =

- Centuries: 17th; 18th; 19th; 20th; 21st
- Decades: 1830s; 1840s; 1850s; 1860s; 1870s
- See also: List of years in Portugal

Events in the year 1855 in Portugal.

== Incumbents ==
- Monarch: Peter V
- Prime Minister: João Carlos Saldanha de Oliveira Daun, 1st Duke of Saldanha

== Arts and entertainment ==
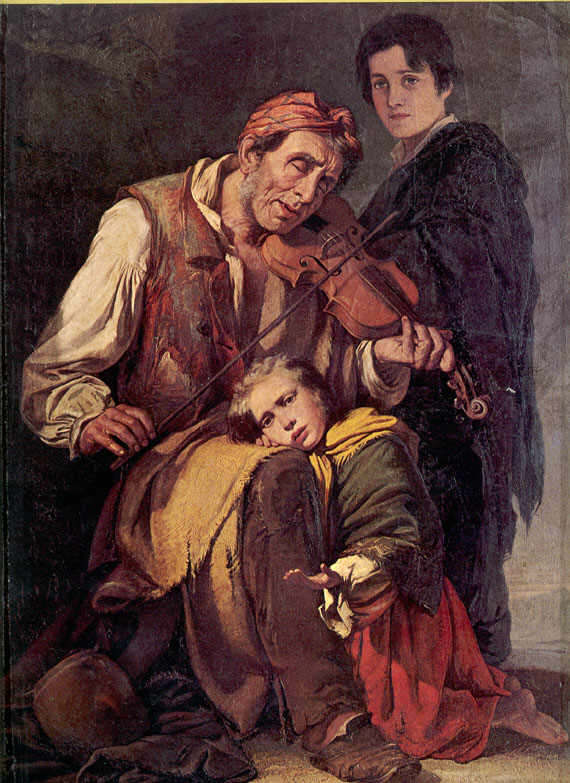
O Pobre Rabequista, 1855 (oil on canvas 170 X 122 cm)

- O Pobre Rabequista (The Poor Rabeca Player), oil painting by José Rodrigues.

== Sports ==
- Oporto Cricket and Lawn Tennis Club founded

== Births ==
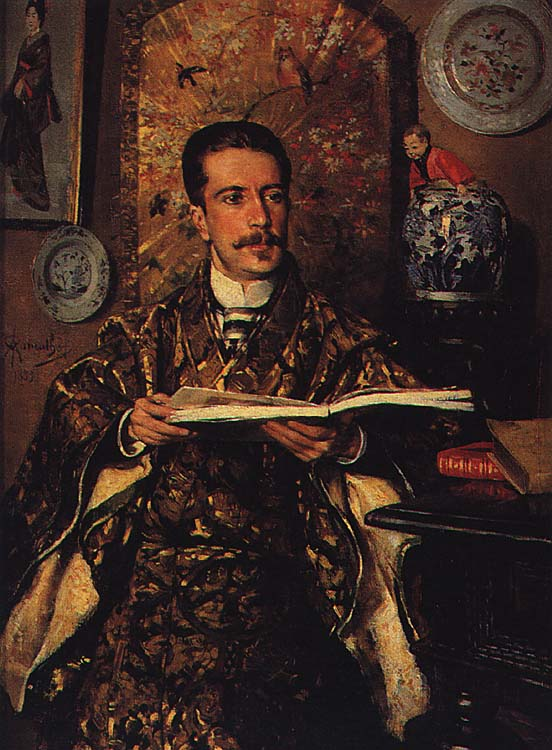
Abel Botelho

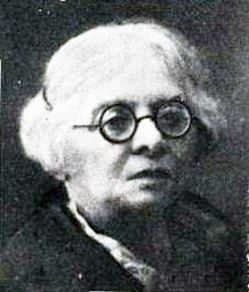
Amélia dos Santos Costa Cardia

- 14 February – João Franco, politician (d. 1929).
- 13 March – António Osório Sarmento de Figueiredo Jr., nobleman, jurist, politician and magistrate. (d. 1935).
- 28 April José Malhoa, painter.
- 23 September – Abel Botelho, diplomat, writer and military officer (d. 1917).

=== Full date missing ===
- Amélia dos Santos Costa Cardia, physician (d. 1938).
