= António de Sousa =

António de Sousa or António Sousa may refer to:

- António Sousa (born 1957), Portuguese former footballer and coach
- António Sousa (runner) (born 1970), Portuguese marathon runner
- Antonio Sousa Alonso (1942–2013), Portuguese professor of chemistry
- António Sousa Chicharo, Portuguese nobleman and 12th Lord of Santarém
- António Sousa Freitas (1921–2004), Portuguese poet
- António Sousa Gomes (1936–2015), Portuguese politician and administrator
- António Sousa Lara (born 1952), Portuguese university professor, nobleman and politician
- António Sousa Pereira (born 1961), Portuguese professor, medic and Dean of Universidade do Porto
- Antônio de Sousa (died 1631), Brazilian nobleman
- Antônio de Souza (bishop) (born 1929), Brazilian bishop
- António de Sousa (poet) (1898–1981), Portuguese poet
- António de Sousa Bastos (1844–1911), Portuguese dramatist and journalist
- António de Sousa Braga (1941–2022), Portuguese bishop
- Antônio de Sousa Braga, Brazilian politician
- António de Sousa Costa (born 1926), Portuguese historian
- António de Sousa Coutinho (fl. 1600s), governor of Portuguese Ceylon
- António de Sousa de Macedo (1606–1682), Portuguese diplomat and writer
- António de Sousa Franco (1942–2004), Portuguese economist and politician
- António de Sousa Hilário (1841—?), Portuguese journalist and writer
- António de Sousa Horta Sarmento Osório (1882–1960), Portuguese writer, sportsman and politician
- António de Sousa Júnior (1871–1938), Portuguese medic and politician
- Antônio de Sousa Leão (1808–1882), Brazilian nobleman
- António de Sousa Lima (1756–1827), Portuguese military leader
- António de Sousa Machado (fl. 1800s), Brazilian politician
- Antônio de Sousa Martins (1829–1896), Brazilian jurist and magistrate
- António de Sousa Maya (1888–1969), Portuguese aviator and soldier
- António de Sousa Meneses (fl. 1600s), Portuguese colonial administrator
- Antônio de Sousa Neto (1803–1866), Brazilian political and military leader
- Antônio de Sousa Peixoto (fl. 1900s), Brazilian politician
- Antônio de Sousa Queirós (1878–?), Brazilian politician
- António de Sousa Vadre Castelino e Alvim (born 1928), Portuguese politician
- Antônio Brito Sousa Gaioso (fl. 1800s), Brazilian politician
- Antônio Alves de Sousa Carvalho (1832–1885), Brazilian politician and writer
- António Augusto de Sousa (1883–?), Portuguese colonial administrator
- António Borges de Medeiros Dias da Câmara e Sousa (1829–1913), Portuguese politician
- António Caetano de Sousa (1674–1759), Portuguese writer and genealogist
- Antônio Caio da Silva Souza (born 1980), Brazilian footballer
- António Carneiro de Sousa (1680— ca. 1755), Portuguese nobleman
- Antônio de Albuquerque Sousa Filho (born 1938), Brazilian professor and writer
- António Damaso de Castro e Sousa (1804–1876), Portuguese priest and writer
- Antônio Emiliano de Sousa Castro (1847–1929), Brazilian nobleman
- António Florêncio de Sousa Pinto (1818–1890), Portuguese politician and writer
- Antônio Francisco de Paula Souza (1843—1917), Brazilian engineer and politician
- Antônio Gonçalves Teixeira e Sousa (1812–1861), Brazilian writer
- Antônio Herculano de Sousa Bandeira (1813–1884), Brazilian professor and lawyer
- Antônio Herculano de Sousa Bandeira Filho (1854—1890), Brazilian lawyer and writer
- Antônio José de Melo e Sousa (1867–1955), Brazilian politician
- António José de Sousa Barroso (1854–1918), Portuguese missionary and bishop
- António José Fernandes de Sousa (born 1955), Portuguese economist
- António José Pereira da Silveira e Sousa (1793—1881), Portuguese judge
- António José Xavier de Camões de Albuquerque Moniz e Sousa (1736–1755), Portuguese politician
- António Luís de Sousa, 2nd Marquis of Minas (1644–1721), Portuguese general and governor-general
- Antônio Manuel de Sousa (1776—1857), Brazilian priest and politician
- Antônio Marcelo Teixeira Sousa (born 1957), Brazilian politician and engineer
- Antonio Marcos Sousa (born 1990), Brazilian-East Timorese footballer
- António Maria de Sousa Horta e Costa (1859–1931), Portuguese nobleman, jurist, magistrate and politician
- António Mariano de Sousa (1842—?), Portuguese Presbyter
- António Martins de Sousa (fl. 1900s), Portuguese journalist
- António Mota de Sousa Horta-Osório (born 1964) is a Portuguese banker
- Antônio Penaforte de Sousa (fl. 1900s), Brazilian politician
- Antônio Pereira de Sousa Barros (1815–1884), Brazilian plantation owner
- Antônio Pereira de Sousa Calheiros (fl. 1800s), Brazilian architect
- António Pereira de Sousa da Câmara (1901–1971), Portuguese professor of engineering
- Antônio Pompeu de Sousa Brasil (1851–1886), Brazilian medic, writer and politician
- António Rebelo de Sousa (born 1952), Portuguese economist
- Antônio Rodrigues de Sousa (1902–?), Brazilian politician
- Antônio Saturnino de Sousa e Oliveira (1809–1877), Brazilian politician
- António Sérgio de Sousa (1809–1878), Portuguese nobleman and colonial administrator
- António Teixeira de Sousa (1857–1917), Portuguese politicianAntónio Teixeira de Sousa
- Antônio Teixeira de Sousa Magalhães (1848–1912), Brazilian politician
- Antônio Telles de Castro e Sousa (1891—1934), Brazilian poet
- Antônio Tibúrcio Ferreira de Souza (1837— 1885, Brazilian military leader
- António Verdial de Sousa (born 1963), East Timorese politician
- António Veríssimo de Sousa (1860–1934), Portuguese military commander of the Azores
- António Xavier de Sousa Monteiro (1829–1906), Portuguese bishop

== See also ==
- Antonio
- Sousa (surname)
- Domingos António de Sousa Coutinho, 1st Marquis of Funchal (1762–1833), Portuguese diplomat and author
- Francisco Antônio de Sousa (fl 1800s), Brazilian politician
- Francisco Antônio de Sousa Queirós (1806–1891), Brazilian politician and landowner
- Francisco Antônio de Sousa Queirós Filho (1837—1917), Brazilian politician
- Inácio Antônio de Sousa Amaral (1800—1878), Brazilian politician and landowner
- João António de Sousa Pais Lourenço (born 1962) Portuguese politician and engineer
- Joaquim Antônio de Sousa Rabelo (?–1897), Brazilian politician and landowner
- José Antônio de Sousa Lima (1831—1900), Brazilian politician
- Luís António de Sousa Botelho Mourão (1722–1798), Portuguese nobleman and politician
- Luís António de Sousa Queirós (1746–1819), Portuguese-Brazilian military leader
- Manuel António de Sousa (1835–1892), Indian-Portuguese merchant and military captain
- Marcio Antonio de Sousa Junior (born 1955), Brazilian footballer
- Miguel António de Sousa Horta Almeida e Vasconcelos, 2nd Baron of Santa Comba Dão (1831– 1891), Portuguese nobleman.
- Zeferino Antônio de Sousa (fl. 1800s), Brazilian politician
