= 1865 in Portugal =

- Centuries: 17th; 18th; 19th; 20th; 21st
- Decades: 1840s; 1850s; 1860s; 1870s; 1880s
- See also: List of years in Portugal

Events in the year 1865 in Portugal.

== Incumbents ==
- Monarch: Louis I
- Prime Minister: Nuno José Severo de Mendoça Rolim de Moura Barreto, 1st Duke of Loulé (until 17 April), Bernardo de Sá Nogueira de Figueiredo, 1st Marquis of Sá da Bandeira (17 April–4 September), Joaquim António de Aguiar (starting 4 September)

== Events ==
- 8 July - Legislative election.

== Arts and entertainment ==
- The 1865 International Exhibition was held in Porto

== Births ==
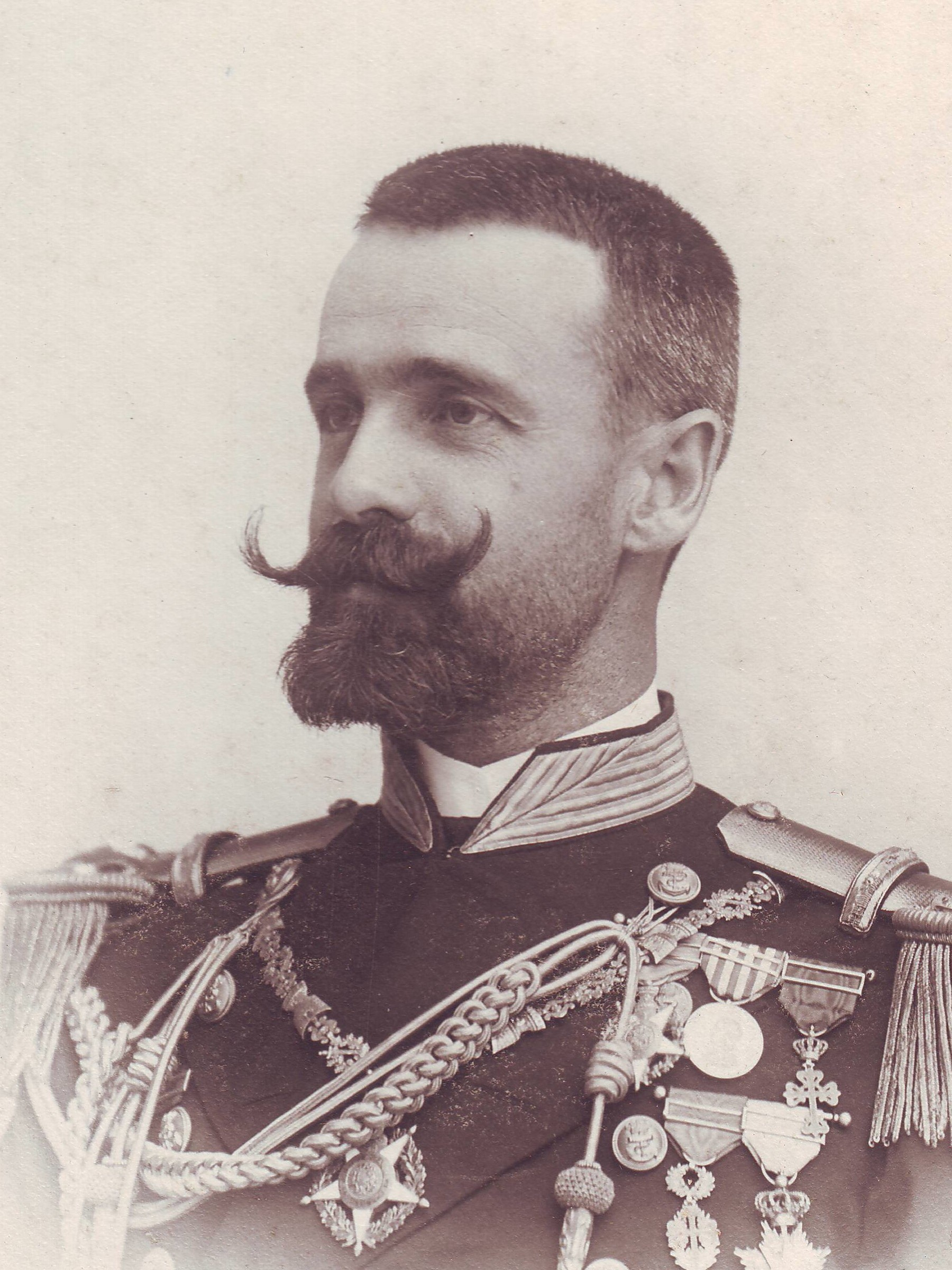
Guilherme Ivens Ferraz

- 14 September – Guilherme Ivens Ferraz, Navy officer (d. 1956)
- Alfredo Rodrigues Gaspar, military officer and politician (died 1938)
- John Buttencourt Avila, Portuguese American farmer, father of the sweet potato industry (died 1937)
