= 1852 in Portugal =

- Decades: 1830s; 1840s; 1850s; 1860s; 1870s
- See also: History of Portugal; Timeline of Portuguese history; List of years in Portugal

Events in the year 1852 in Portugal.

== Incumbents ==
- Monarch: Mary II
- Prime Minister: João Carlos Saldanha de Oliveira Daun, 1st Duke of Saldanha

== Events ==
- 9 August – Earthquake causing casualties in São Miguel Island.
- 10 December – abolishing of the death penalty for political crimes.
- 12 December – legislative election.

=== Date unknown ===
- Founding of the Historic Party.

== Arts ==
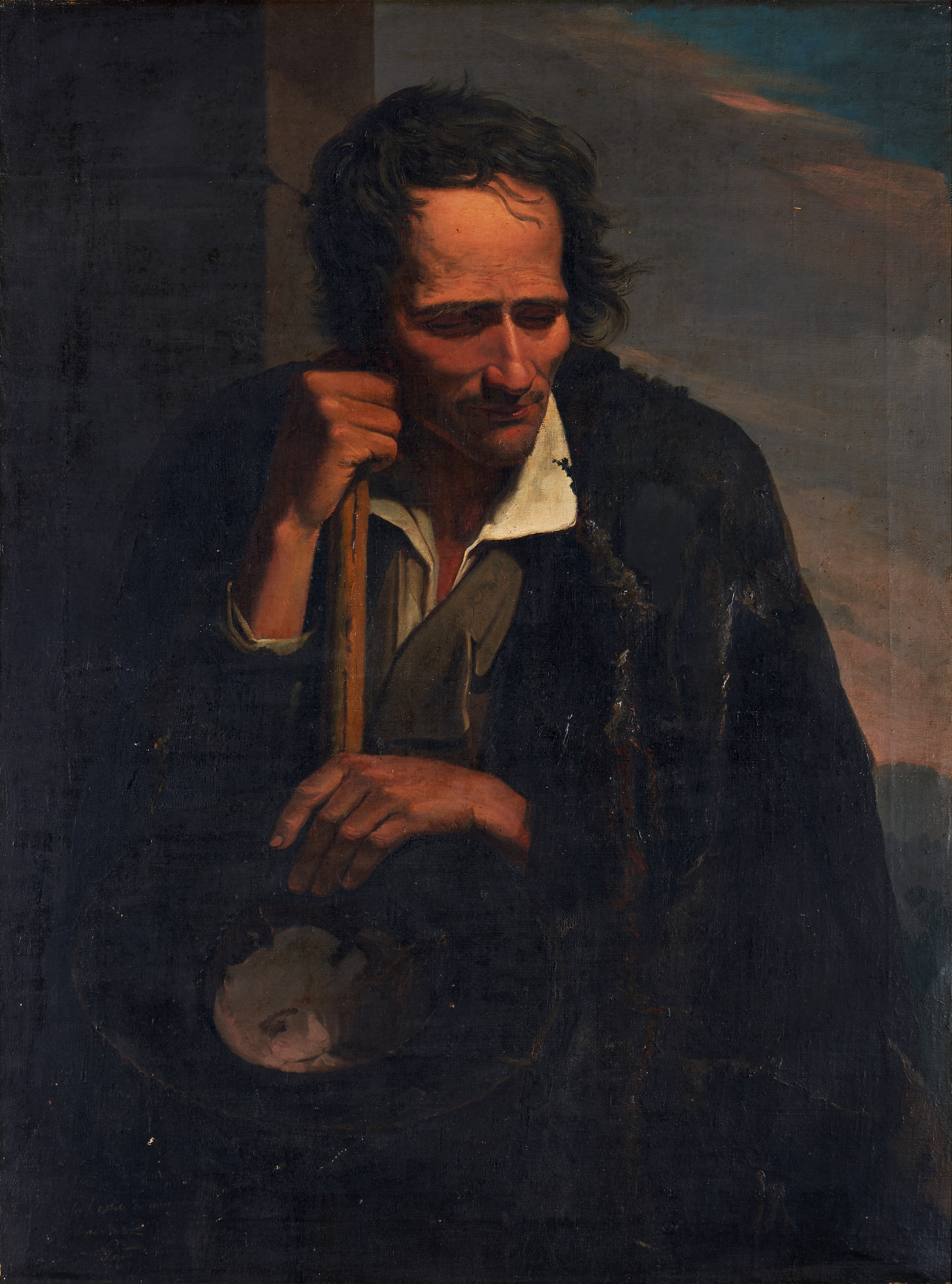
Pobre Cego by Francisco Pinto da Costa, 1852.

- Pobre Cego – Francisco Pinto da Costa.

== Births ==
- 5 August – Infanta Maria das Neves of Portugal, daughter of Miguel I of Portugal (d. 1941).
