= 1859 in Portugal =

- Decades: 1830s; 1840s; 1850s; 1860s; 1870s
- See also: History of Portugal; Timeline of Portuguese history; List of years in Portugal

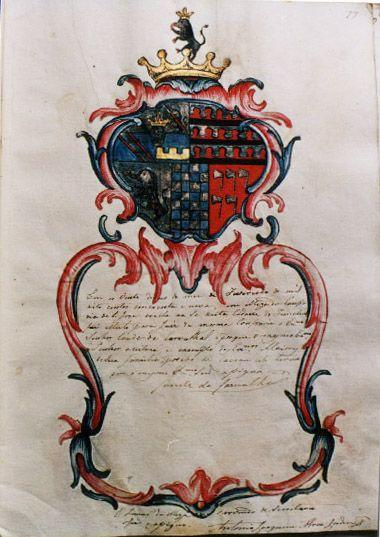
Coat of arms of the 2nd Count of Carvalhal from the book of brothers of the Confraria de São José da Sé do Funchal, dated February 28, 1859

Events in the year 1859 in Portugal.

== Incumbents ==
- Monarch: Pedro V
- President of the Council of Ministers: Nuno José Severo de Mendoça Rolim de Moura Barreto, 1st Duke of Loulé (until 16 March), António José Severim de Noronha, 1st Duke of Terceira (from 16 March)

== Births ==
- 1 January - Henrique Pousão, painter (died 1884)
- 21 September - António Maria de Sousa Horta e Costa, nobleman, jurist, magistrate, politician (died 1931)
- Jaime de Magalhães Lima, philosopher, poet, writer (died 1936)

== Deaths ==
- 17 January - Francisco de Melo da Gama de Araújo e Azevedo, field marshal, governor of Diu in Portuguese India (born 1773)
- Honório Barreto, governor of Portuguese Guinea (born 1813)

== See also ==
- List of colonial governors in 1859#Portugal
