= 1862 in Portugal =

- Centuries: 17th; 18th; 19th; 20th; 21st
- Decades: 1840s; 1850s; 1860s; 1870s; 1880s
- See also: List of years in Portugal

Events in the year 1862 in Portugal.

== Incumbents ==
- Monarch: Louis I
- Prime Minister: Nuno José Severo de Mendoça Rolim de Moura Barreto, 1st Duke of Loulé

== Births ==
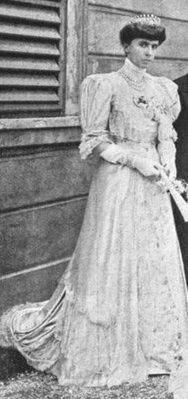
Infanta Maria Antonia of Portugal

- 19 May – João do Canto e Castro, naval officer and politician (died 1934)
- 28 November – Infanta Maria Antonia of Portugal (d. 1959)

== Deaths ==
- 28 December – Joaquim Casimiro, composer and organist (b. 1808).
