= 1854 in Portugal =

- Decades: 1830s; 1840s; 1850s; 1860s; 1870s
- See also: History of Portugal; Timeline of Portuguese history; List of years in Portugal

Events in the year 1854 in Portugal.

== Incumbents ==
- Monarch: Peter V
- Prime Minister: João Carlos Saldanha de Oliveira Daun, 1st Duke of Saldanha

== Events ==
- 26 February – Students of the University of Coimbra and locals clash in riots during Carnival.
- 14 December – Signing of a decree requiring the registration of all slaves in Overseas Provinces as libertos ("freed slave", but not with equal rights to a free born individual).

== Arts and entertainment ==
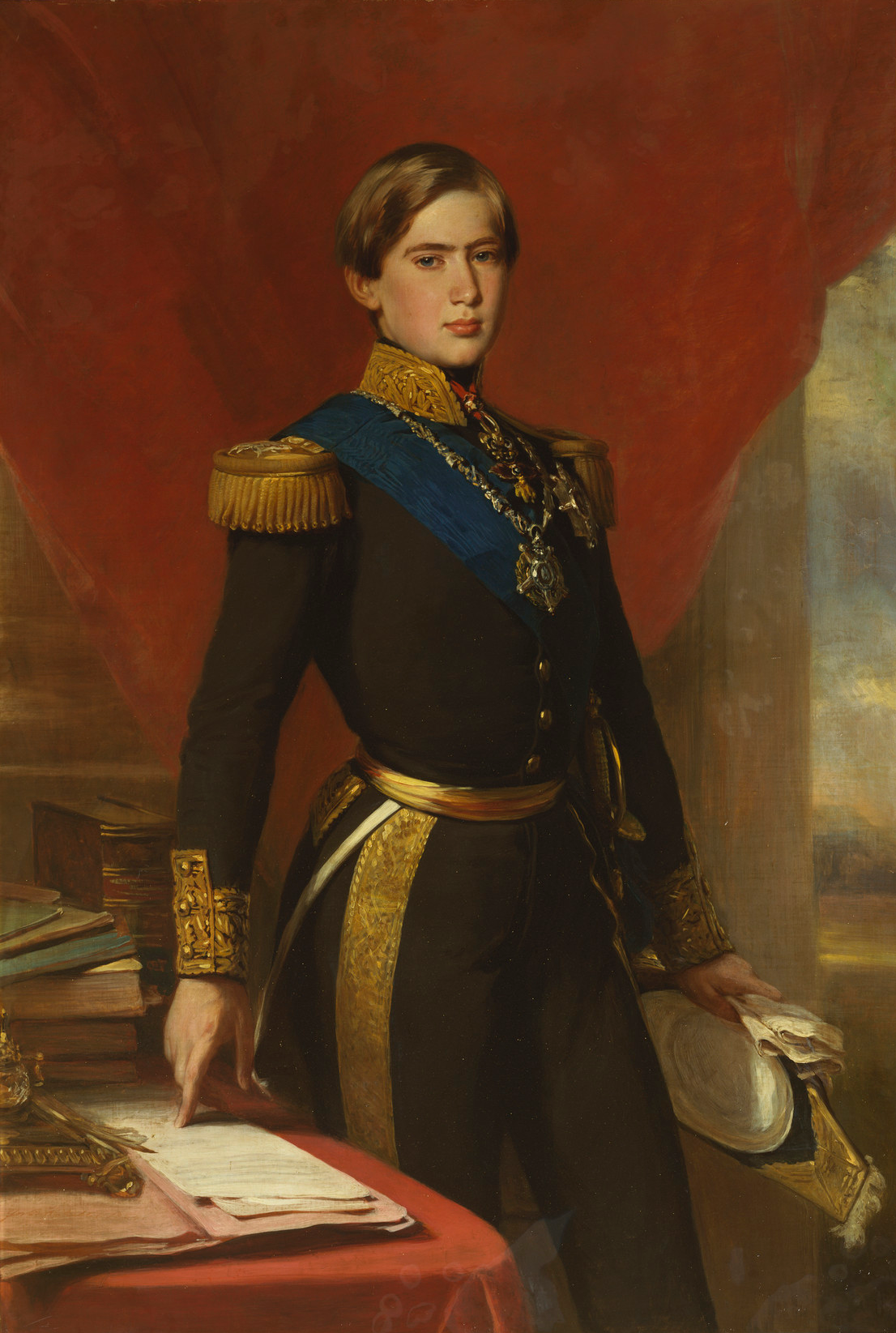
Pedro V, King of Portugal by Franz Xaver Winterhalter, 1854 (oil on canvas 138.5 X 95 cm).

- Pedro V, King of Portugal (1837–61), oil painting by Franz Xaver Winterhalter.

== Births ==
- 17 September – Francisco de Arruda Furtado, naturalist (d. 1887).
- 29 November – Egas Moniz, neurologist, inventor of the lobotomy, and first Portuguese to be awarded a Nobel Prize (d. 1955).

== Deaths ==
- 9 December – Almeida Garrett, writer, journalist, and politician (b. 1799).
