= 1851 in Portugal =

- Decades: 1830s; 1840s; 1850s; 1860s; 1870s
- See also: History of Portugal; Timeline of Portuguese history; List of years in Portugal

Events in the year 1851 in Portugal.

== Incumbents ==
- Monarch: Mary II
- Prime Minister:
  - da Costa Cabral (until 26 April)
  - António José Severim de Noronha, 1st Duke of Terceira (until 1 May)
  - João Carlos Saldanha de Oliveira Daun, 1st Duke of Saldanha

== Events ==
- 1 May – coup causing the end of Costa Cabral's tenure and of the Septembrist government. Start of the Regeneration period.
- 4 May – protests in Lisbon, suppressed by the municipal guard.
- 2 November – legislative election.

=== Date unknown ===
- Founding of the Regenerator Party.

== Births ==
- 28 January – Francisco Gomes Teixeira, mathematician (died 1933).
- 28 March – Bernardino Machado, president of Portugal in 1915-1917 and 1925-1926 (died 1944).
- 28 May – Luís Pinto de Soveral, 1st Marquis of Soveral, diplomat (died 1922).
- 13 November – António Maria Vasco de Melo Silva César e Meneses, noble, diplomat (died 1923).
