= Miguel António de Sousa Horta Almeida e Vasconcelos, 2nd Baron of Santa Comba Dão =

Portuguese nobleman

Miguel António de Sousa Horta Almeida e Vasconcelos, 2nd Baron of Santa Comba Dão (São Paulo de Luanda, Angola, 22 August 1831 – 24 February 1891) was a Portuguese nobleman.

He was the eldest child and son and successor of José Maria de Sousa Macedo Almeida e Vasconcelos, 1st Baron of Santa Comba Dão and Maria Benta de Miranda e Horta.

== Life ==
He was born, like his younger sister, at São Paulo de Luanda, Angola, where his father was the Governor and Captain General, and was named after King Miguel of Portugal and both his paternal grandfather and paternal uncle. Because of the Letter of Law of 19 May 1863 that came to abolish all the Majorats and Chapels he was co-heir of his parents and all of his father's several former Majorats and House or Paço of os Arcos, all in Santa Comba Dão, Santa Comba Dão, with his sister, who was unmarried and had no children and lived with her brother.

He was a fidalgo knight of the Royal Household by succession and a Bachelor graduated in Law from the University of Coimbra.

He was 2nd Baron of Santa Comba Dão by Decree of Luís I of Portugal.

== Family ==
He married firstly on 13 July 1850 his first cousin Maria Ludovina Vieira da Silva de Sousa Almeida e Vasconcelos (30 November 1824 - 18 August 1852), daughter of Manuel Vieira da Silva Borges e Abreu, 1st Baron of Alvaiázere and Maria Ludovina Máxima de Sousa Almeida e Vasconcelos de Macedo, and had an only daughter:

- Maria Ludovina de Sousa Horta (7 July 1852 - 1 January 1935), married on 29 August 1880/1881 António Osório Sarmento de Figueiredo, Jr. (Santa Marta de Penaguião, Cumieira, 13 March 1855 - Lisbon, Mercês, 19 May 1935), and had issue

He married secondly Maria da Glória da Costa Brandão e Albuquerque (24 November 1827 - 15 May 1886), daughter of António José da Costa Brandão de Brito de Mesquita Vaz Velho Castelo-Branco, Captain-Major of Oliveirinha, Fidalgo of the Royal Household, etc., and second wife, distant cousin, goddaughter, sister in law and godmother Teresa Augusta de Albuquerque Pinto Tavares Castelo-Branco, and sister of the 1st Viscount of Ervedal da Beira, and had eight children:

- Miguel Maria de Sousa Horta e Costa, 3rd Baron of Santa Comba Dão (Santa Comba Dão, Santa Comba Dão, 26 April 1857 - Lisbon, 28 February/1 March 1934)
- José Maria de Sousa Horta e Costa (Santa Comba Dão, Santa Comba Dão, 20 October 1858 – Porto, Foz do Douro, 21 September 1927)
- António Maria de Sousa Horta e Costa (21 September 1859 - 5 September 1931)
- Sebastião Maria de Sousa Horta e Costa (19 September 1860 - 23 December 1945), Bachelor graduated in Law from the University of Coimbra, Fidalgo of the Royal Household, proprietor in Vila Nova de Oliveirinha, Tábua, Conservator of the Predial Register in the Comarca of Aldeia Galega do Ribatejo, etc., married on 7 July/August 1887 Maria Clara, sometimes Maria Clarisse, de Sousa Monteiro Correia Gomes (11 December 1864 - ?), daughter of António Patrício Correia Gomes, large and wealthy Proprietary in Coruche, and Maria Clara Teixeira de Sousa Monteiro (sister of Dom António Xavier de Sousa Monteiro, 11th Bishop of Beja), sister of his sister in law, and had two daughters, and by Maria da Conceição de Oliveira (born Tábua, Candosa) had one bastard son:
  - Maria Susana Monteiro Gomes Horta e Costa (1 May 1889 - ?), married on 1 November 1913 Carlos Duarte Mascarenhas de Meneses (24 January 1884 - ?), Cavalry Officer Major, with the Course of the Arm, etc., only son of Tomás Eugénio Mascarenhas de Meneses and first wife Sofia de Freitas, and had issue, one daughter
  - Maria da Glória Monteiro Gomes Horta e Costa (9 August 1890 - Lisbon, 24 September 1937), married firstly on 4 December 1909 Dr. Francisco de Paula de Carvalho Vale e Vasconcelos (4 May 18?? - 11 April 1910), Medic, etc., and had issue, one son, and married secondly on 23 November 1915 Eduardo Francisco de Azeredo e Vasconcelos (1889/1899 - k.i.a. with a German submarine, off Oitavos, World War I, 23 August 1918), First Lieutenant of Maritime Aviation, etc., and had issue, one son
  - Octávio Maria de Oliveira (Tábua, Candosa, 10 August 1898 - 15 January 1977), married in Cascais on 19 April 1934 Maria Luísa Ramil Saldanha (Lisbon, São Mamede, 15 October 1912 - Cascais, Parede, 19 November 2001), only legitimate daughter of Luís Carlos de Leão Saldanha and Maria José de Almeida Ramil, without issue
- Maria da Conceição de Sousa Horta e Costa (19 May 1864 - 13 October 19??), married José da Costa Henriques (27 October 186? - 9 October 1933), Teacher of the Ordinary Superior School of Coimbra, etc., and had issue
- Luís Maria de Sousa Horta e Costa (15 November 1865 - 10 March 1946)
- Diogo Maria de Sousa Horta e Costa (6 June/July 1867 - ?), Superior Official and 1st Official of the Ministry of Public Instruction, etc., married Cristina Pedreira de Lima, by whom he had had one son, and had a recognized son:
  - Diogo Luís de Sousa Horta or Diogo Luís de Lima Horta e Costa (born 24 September 1919/1920), Licentiate in Medicine, married German Annelise Marie Stuhlmacher (born 1 October 1927), and had three children:
    - Vera Maria Stuhlmacher Horta e Costa (born 2 May 1956)
    - Diogo Frederico Stuhlmacher Horta e Costa (born 24 May 1958)
    - Pedro Miguel Stuhlmacher Horta e Costa (born 6 June 1963)
  - Luís Diogo de Sousa Lopes e Horta or Lopes de Sousa Horta or Luís Diogo Horta e Costa (born 3 July 1913/1914), Licentiate in Medicine from the University of Lisbon, Stomatologist, married on 22 July 1948 Maria Isabel Pizarro Xavier Montalvão Machado (born Chaves, 30 November 1924), daughter of Dr. José Timóteo Montalvão Machado, Licentiate in Medicine from the University of Lisbon, specialized in Ophthalmology from the University of Paris, etc., Secretary General of the Associação dos Arqueólogos Portugueses (Association of Portuguese Archaeologists), Genealogist, etc., and Maria Leonor Pizarro Xavier, and had three daughters:
    - Leonor Maria Montalvão Horta e Costa (born Coimbra, 6 May 1949)married Luís Filipe Serra Matias and had one children: *Mariana Montalvão Horta e Costa Matias (born Coimbra, 29 May 1980)
    - Maria José Montalvão Horta e Costa (born Coimbra, 24 April 1951)
    - Maria de Lurdes Montalvão Horta e Costa (born Coimbra, 9 October 1955)married Arnaud Max Marcel René Lantoine (born Abbeville, 26 August 1954) and had one children: *Alain José Montalvão Horta e Costa Lantoine (born Coimbra 13 June 1984)
- Bernardo Maria de Sousa Horta e Costa (15 August 1870 - ?)

== Sources ==
- Various, Resenha das Famílias Titulares do Reino de Portugal, Lisboa, 1838, pp. 206–207
- Albano da Silveira Pinto and Dom Augusto Romano Sanches de Baena Farinha de Almeida Portugal Silva e Sousa, 1st Viscount of Sanches de Baena, Resenha das Famílias Titulares e Grandes de Portugal, Fernando Santos e Rodrigo Faria de Castro, 2.ª Edição, Braga, 1991, pp. 516–517
- Domingos de Araújo Affonso and Rui Dique Travassos Valdez, Livro de Oiro da Nobreza, J. A. Telles da Sylva, 2.ª edição, Lisboa, 1988, Volume III, pp. 234–240 and 890
- Afonso Eduardo Martins Zúquete, Nobreza de Portugal e do Brasil, Volume Terceiro, p. 289
- António de Vasconcelos, Brás Garcia Mascarenhas, Imprensa da Universidade, Coimbra, 1921, p. 156
- Nuno Gonçalo de Carvalho Canas Mendes, Freires de S. Gião, Pedro Ferreira, 1.ª Edição, Lisboa, 1995, p. 143
- Francisco Xavier Valeriano de Sá, Vice-Reis e Governadores da Índia Portuguesa, CTMC Descobrimentos Portugueses, Macau, 1999, p. 356
- Manuel Rosado Marques de Camões e Vasconcelos, Albuquerques da Beira, Lisboa, 1948, p. 123
- Various, Anuário da Nobreza de Portugal, III, 1985, Tomo I, p. 854, Tomo II, pp. 1,048 and 1,054 and Tomo III, p. 1,573
- Miguel António de Sousa Horta Almeida e Vasconcelos, 2nd Baron of Santa Comba Dão in a Portuguese Genealogical site
