= João Cristino da Silva =

Portuguese painter and illustrator

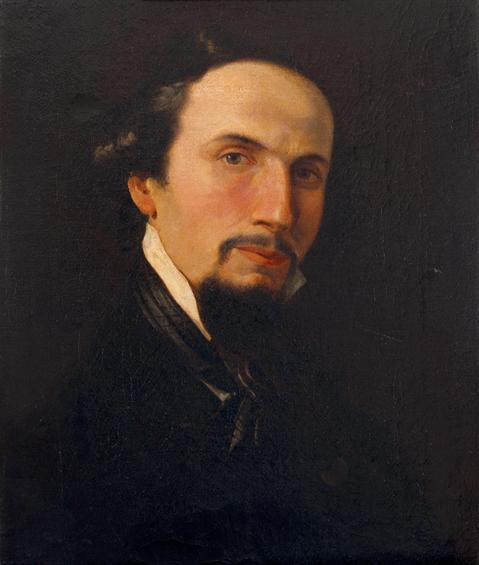
Self-portrait (c.1855)

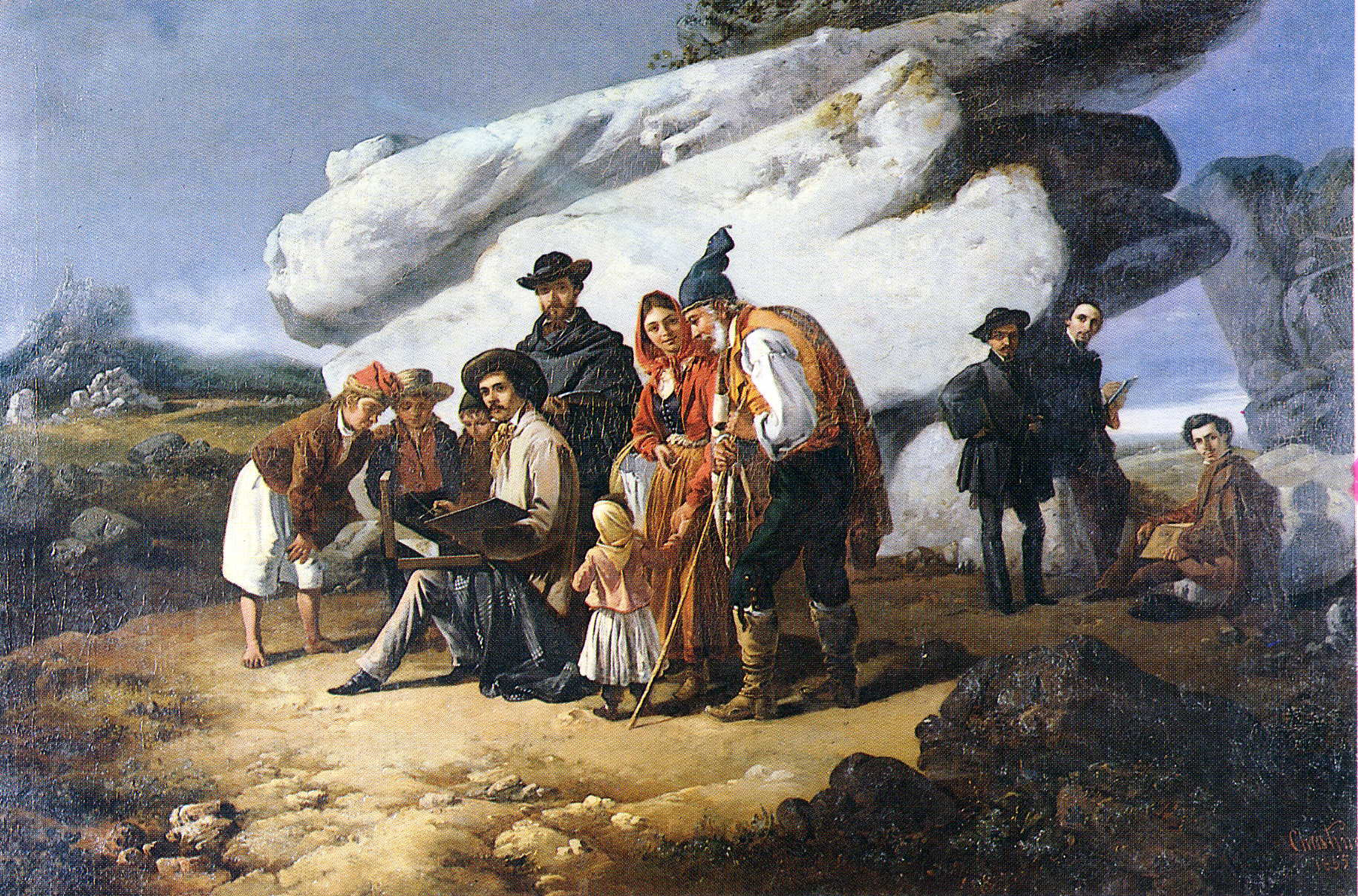
Five Artists at Sintra (1850s)

João Cristino da Silva (14 July 1829, Lisbon - 12 May 1877, Lisbon) was a Portuguese painter and illustrator in the Romantic style.

== Biography ==
He was born into a merchant family and began his studies at the Academy of Fine Arts of the University of Lisbon in 1841, but was known for being temperamental, taking issue with his instructor, António Manuel da Fonseca, and the school's teaching methods, so he left in 1847 without completing his courses. From 1847 to 1849 he worked as an engraver at the "Arsenal do Exército" (Army Arsenal). He then returned to painting.

Soon he began to exhibit, in Paris and Madrid as well as Portugal. He was mainly known as a landscape painter and often worked with Tomás da Anunciação, who he considered to be his true teacher. At the Exposition Universelle (1855), he exhibited what is probably his best-known work "Cinco Artistas em Sintra" (Five Artists at Sintra), which was later purchased by King Ferdinand II. After a showing in Madrid, he was knighted by King Amadeo I.

In 1860, he became a substitute Professor at the Academy, but abandoned the post in 1867 because of continuing disagreements with the administration. That year, he received a travel subsidy; visiting France and Switzerland. He also collaborated in providing illustrations for the weekly magazine Arquivo Pitoresco, which was published from 1857 to 1868.

He became mentally unbalanced and died of heart failure in the psychiatric hospital at the Convento de Rilhafoles.
