= José Maria de Sousa Macedo Almeida e Vasconcelos, 1st Baron of Santa Comba Dão =

Portuguese nobleman, military officer and politician

José Maria de Sousa Macedo Almeida e Vasconcelos, 1st Baron of Santa Comba Dão, ComC (25 June 1787 in Santa Comba Dão – 4 September 1872 in Santa Comba Dão) was a Portuguese nobleman, military and politician.

He was the eldest child and son and successor of António de Sousa de Macedo Almeida e Vasconcelos and Maria Hipólita Cassiana da Flor da Rosa da Cunha Gusmão e Figueiredo.

== Life ==
He enlisted as a Cadet in the Infantry Regiment 11 and was promoted to Alferes on 22 August 1808. He was elected a Deputy for the circle of Santa Comba Dão in the Vintism to the Constituent Cortes of 1820, and ascended to Colonel of Infantry of the extinct Militias of Tondela on 27 September 1823.

He was created a Fidalgo Knight of the Royal Household by Alvará of 13 July 1825 and a Commander of the Order of Christ.

The concession of the title of 1st Baron of Santa Comba Dão was by and after his marriage by Decree of 8 September 1825 of John VI of Portugal. His coat of arms was quartered, on the first de Sousa do Prado, on the second de Almeida, on the third de Macedo and on the fourth de Vasconcelos (sometimes the third and fourth appear vice versa) with Crest of de Sousa do Prado and a Coronet of Baron.

He was a partidary and always followed the cause of Miguel of Portugal, who by Decree of 18 March 1829 appointed him the 55th Governor and Captain General of the Province of Angola (with capital at São Paulo de Luanda, where his children were born), where he struggled with the greatest hardships, lack of resources of all kind, which the Metropole, handling the civil fights (it is not known if he had the chance of taking part in the conflict while at Portugal between 1828 and 1829), could not send him. However, he remained in the hard exercise of his office until the acclamation of Maria II of Portugal in 1834, when a Military Junta took over the office until 1836 and thanks to the Concession of Evoramonte he retired with his family unharmed and without being prosecuted nor deprived of any received honour. Meanwhile, he had become Lord of several Majorats and Lord of the House or Paço of os Arcos, all in Santa Comba Dão, Santa Comba Dão, succeeding in the House to his father on 21 October 1833, and returned to Santa Comba Dão to take over his estates.

He was elected Deputy for the circle of Santa Comba Dão to the Legislatura of the Cortes Gerais of 1842–1845, in a time when the government of António José Severim de Noronha, 1st Duke of Terceira that came out of the coup d'état of 1842 also included Miguelists, but he never took seat.

He resided in Santa Comba Dão. His Majorats became extinct with the Letter of Law of 19 May 1863 that came to abolish all the Majorats and Chapels, excepting, with Article 13th, the House of Braganza.

== Family ==
He married by proxy at the Village of Santa Comba Dão, in Santa Comba Dão, on 28 April 1825 to Maria Benta de Miranda e Horta (17 January 1810 - 20 June or July 1855), only daughter and heiress of António José Correia da Franca e Horta and Luísa Catarina Schibbert, who had been granted the special grace, as a reward for her father's services, with the promise of the title of Baron for the person to whom she would marry, by Decree of 7 December 1824 of John VI of Portugal, and had two children:

- Miguel António de Sousa Horta Almeida e Vasconcelos, 2nd Baron of Santa Comba Dão (São Paulo de Luanda, Angola, 22 August 1831 – 24 February 1891), named after King Miguel of Portugal and both his paternal grandfather and paternal uncle
- Maria Hipólita de Sousa Horta Almeida e Vasconcelos (São Paulo de Luanda, Angola, 26 January 1833 - after 1885), named after her paternal grandmother, unmarried and without issue

== Sources ==
- Various, Resenha das Famílias Titulares do Reino de Portugal, Lisboa, 1838, pp. 206–207
- Albano da Silveira Pinto and Dom Augusto Romano Sanches de Baena Farinha de Almeida Portugal Silva e Sousa, 1st Viscount of Sanches de Baena, Resenha das Famílias Titulares e Grandes de Portugal, Fernando Santos e Rodrigo Faria de Castro, 2.ª Edição, Braga, 1991, pp. 516–518
- Domingos de Araújo Affonso and Rui Dique Travassos Valdez, Livro de Oiro da Nobreza, J. A. Telles da Sylva, 2.ª edição, Lisboa, 1988, Volume III, pp. 233–234
- Afonso Eduardo Martins Zúquete, Nobreza de Portugal e do Brasil, Volume Terceiro, pp. 288–289
- Various, Anuário da Nobreza de Portugal, III, 1985, Tomo I, p. 854, Tomo II, p. 1,047
- José Maria de Sousa (de) Macedo Almeida e Vasconcelos, 1st Baron of Santa Comba Dão in a Portuguese Genealogical site
