= 1866 in Portugal =

- Centuries: 17th; 18th; 19th; 20th; 21st
- Decades: 1840s; 1850s; 1860s; 1870s; 1880s
- See also: List of years in Portugal

Events in the year 1866 in Portugal.

== Incumbents ==
- Monarch: Louis I
- Prime Minister: Joaquim António de Aguiar

== Events ==
- St Andrew's Church, Lisbon established by the Free Church of Scotland.

== Births ==
- 27 July – António José de Almeida, politician (died 1929)

== Deaths ==
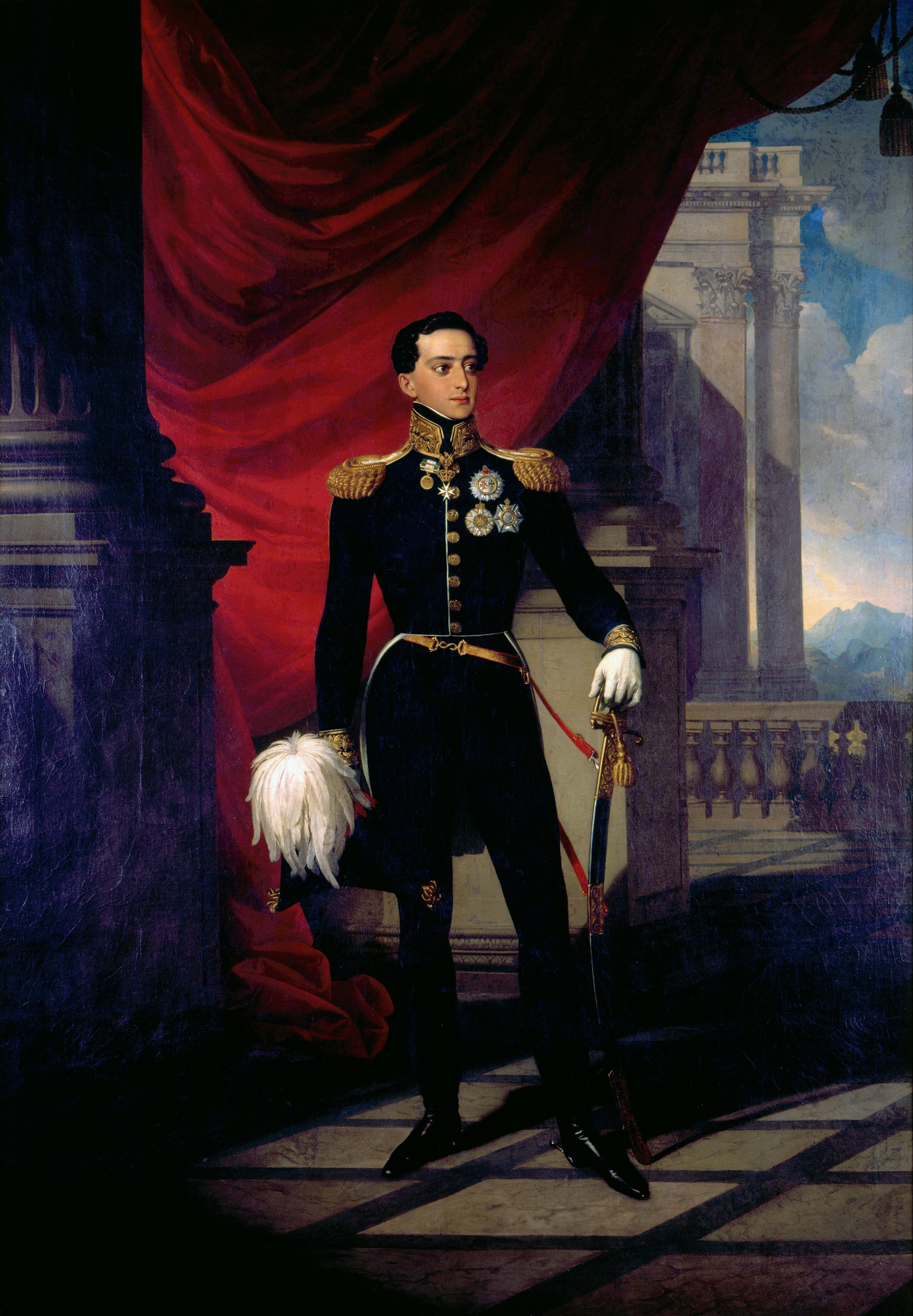
Miguel I of Portugal

- 14 November – Miguel I of Portugal (b. 1802)
