= 1856 in Portugal =

- Centuries: 17th; 18th; 19th; 20th; 21st
- Decades: 1830s; 1840s; 1850s; 1860s; 1870s
- See also: List of years in Portugal

Events in the year 1856 in Portugal.

== Incumbents ==
- Monarch: Peter V
- Prime Minister: Nuno José Severo de Mendoça Rolim de Moura Barreto, 1st Duke of Loulé

== Events ==
- Provisional opening of the Santa Apolónia railway station on 28 October 1856.
- Legislative elections were held on 9 November 1856.
