= 1863 in Portugal =

- Centuries: 17th; 18th; 19th; 20th; 21st
- Decades: 1840s; 1850s; 1860s; 1870s; 1880s
- See also: List of years in Portugal

Events in the year 1863 in Portugal.

== Incumbents ==
- Monarch: Louis I
- Prime Minister: Nuno José Severo de Mendoça Rolim de Moura Barreto, 1st Duke of Loulé

== Births ==
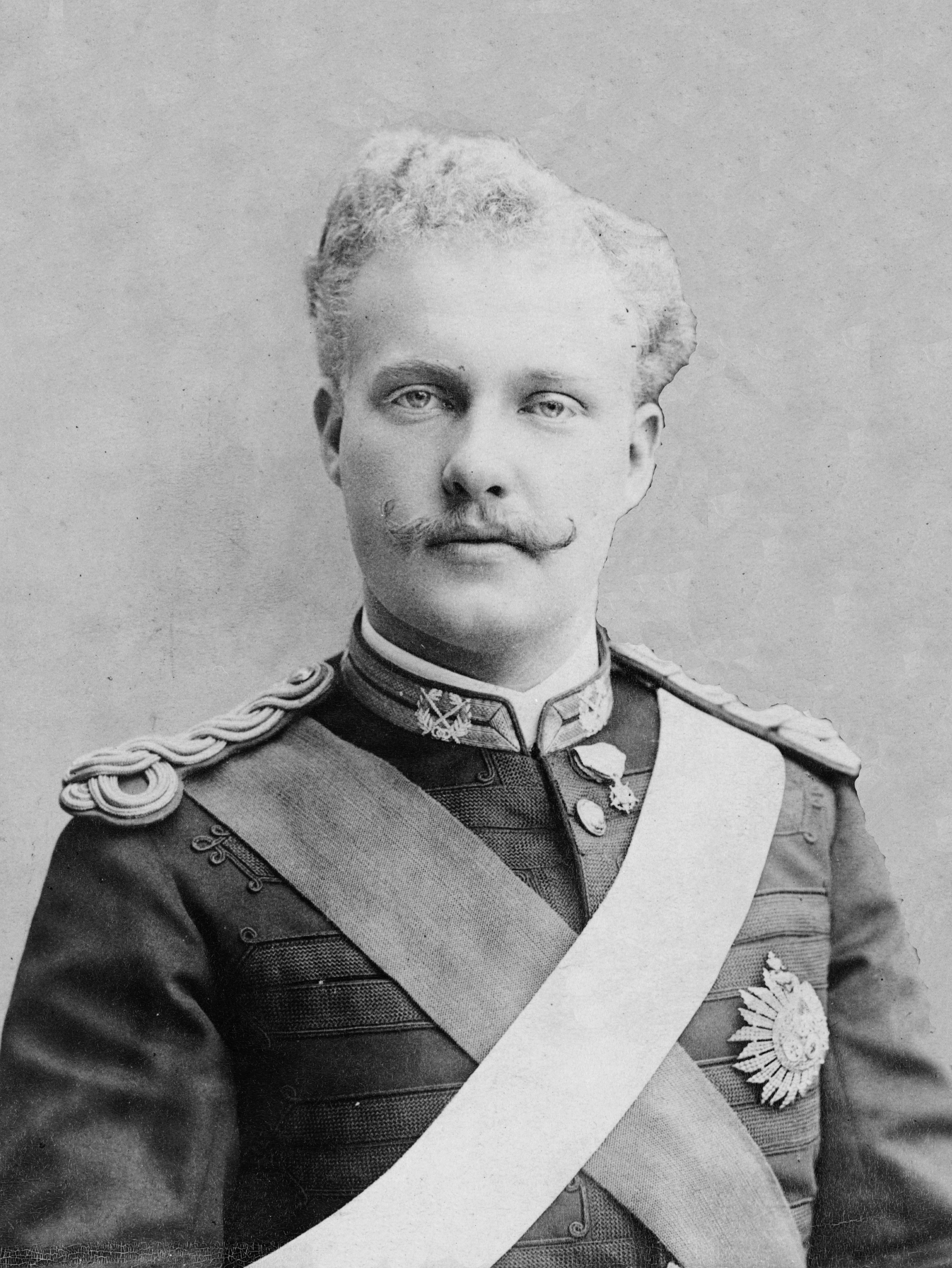
Carlos I of Portugal

- 14 January – Manuel de Oliveira Gomes da Costa, military officer and politician (died 1929)
- 28 September – Carlos I of Portugal, king (died 1908).
