= 1858 in Portugal =

- Centuries: 17th; 18th; 19th; 20th; 21st
- Decades: 1830s; 1840s; 1850s; 1860s; 1870s
- See also: List of years in Portugal

Events in the year 1858 in Portugal.

== Incumbents ==
- Monarch: Peter V
- Prime Minister: Nuno José Severo de Mendoça Rolim de Moura Barreto, 1st Duke of Loulé

== Events ==
- 2 May - Legislative election.

== Births ==
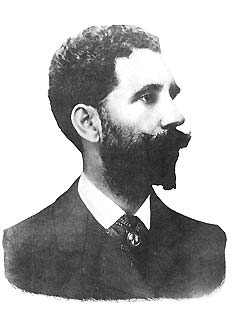
José Relvas

- 5 March – José Relvas, land owner and politician (died 1929)
