= 1791 in Portugal =

- Centuries: 16th; 17th; 18th; 19th; 20th
- Decades: 1770s; 1780s; 1790s; 1800s; 1810s
- See also: List of years in Portugal

Events in the year 1791 in Portugal.

== Incumbents ==
- Monarch: Mary I

== Births ==
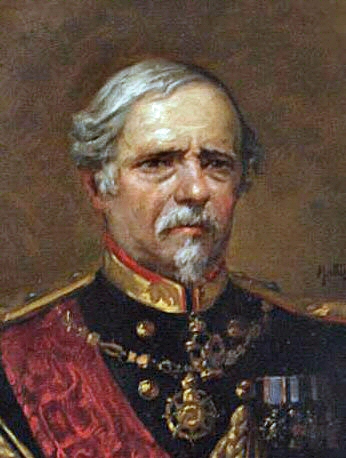
José Jorge Loureiro

- 23 April – José Jorge Loureiro, soldier and politician (died 1860)

== Deaths ==
- 18 October – João de Loureiro, Jesuit missionary and botanist (b. 1710/1717).
