= 1864 in Portugal =

- Centuries: 17th; 18th; 19th; 20th; 21st
- Decades: 1840s; 1850s; 1860s; 1870s; 1880s
- See also: List of years in Portugal

Events in the year 1864 in Portugal.

== Incumbents ==
- Monarch: Louis I
- Prime Minister: Nuno José Severo de Mendoça Rolim de Moura Barreto, 1st Duke of Loulé

== Events ==
- 11 September - Legislative election.
- 29 September – Signing of the Treaty of Lisbon, on boundaries between Spain and Portugal
- Banco Nacional Ultramarino established

== Births ==
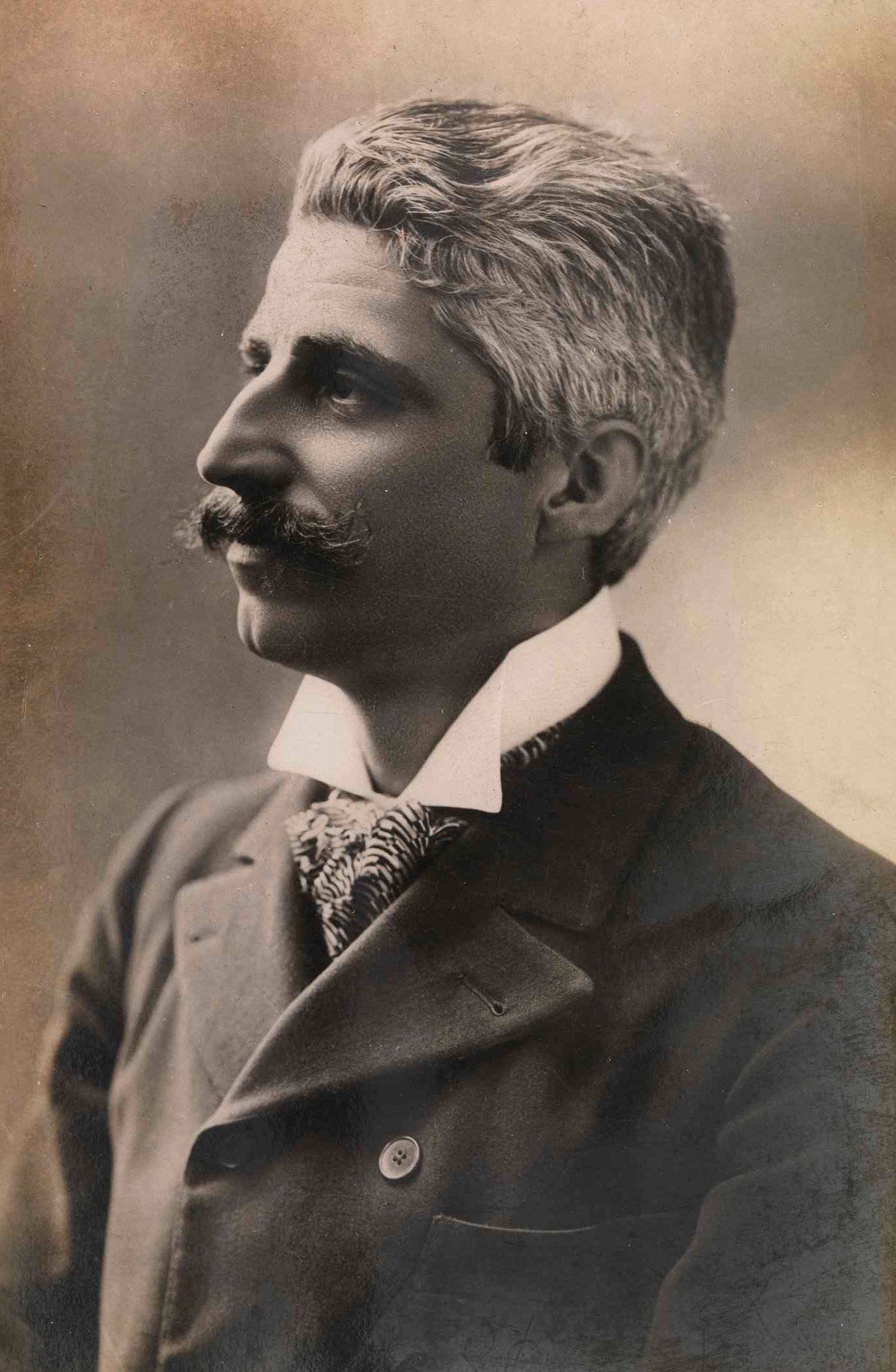
Duarte Leite

- 6 June – Alfredo de Sá Cardoso, military officer and politician (died 1950)
- 11 August – Duarte Leite, historian, mathematician, journalist, diplomat and politician (died 1950)
