= Tomás da Anunciação =

Portuguese painter

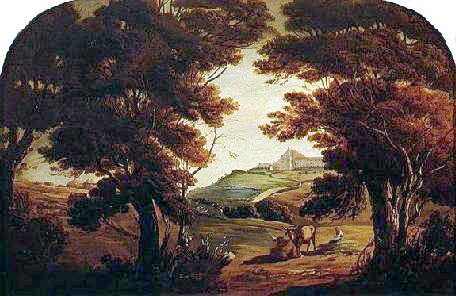
View of Penha de França, 1857, now at the Chiado Museum.

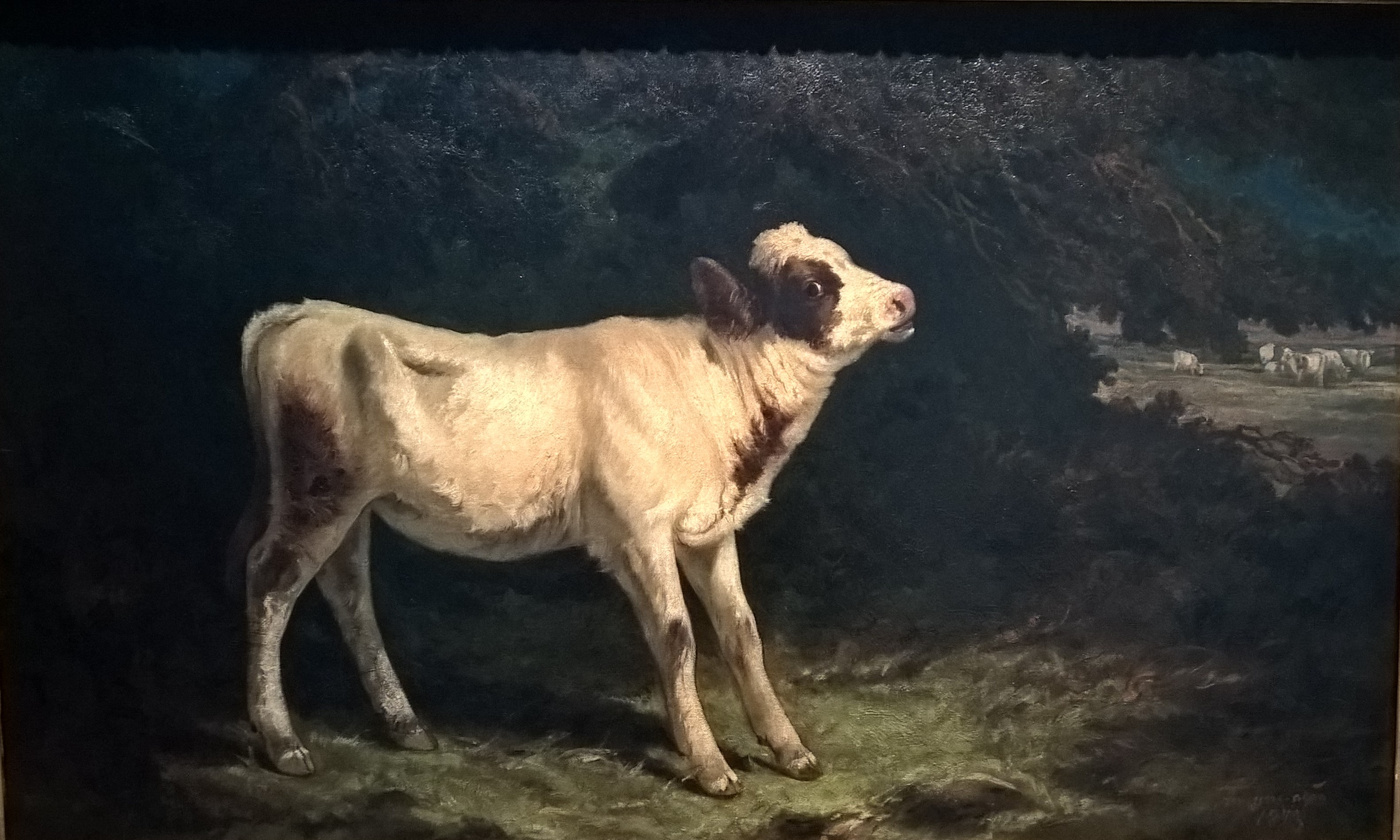
The Calf, 1873, now at the Chiado Museum in Lisbon.

Tomás José da Anunciação (26 October 1821 – 3 April 1879) was a Portuguese painter.

== Life ==
He was born at Ajuda near Lisbon and learned his art in the academy of that city. Afterwards he travelled through Spain and France. Principally an animal painter, he was considered the best artist in that branch of art in the Iberian Peninsula; but he occasionally executed genre pictures.

He was Director of the Academy of Fine Arts in Lisbon, where he died in 1879. The following are some of his most noteworthy works: Lisbon. Galeria Nacional. View of Amora, Two Women at a Fountain, View of the Penhade Franca, Oxen treading out Corn at Ribatejo, After pasture — View on the Tagus, and The Shepherd's Rest (1852).

In 1884, the Prémio Anunciação award was established in his honor. It was presented until 1983.

While still a student at the Academy of Fine Arts, where he was accepted in 1837 and later quit for a brief period in protest over the academic teaching method, the artist acquired an interest in landscape painting. Anunciaço, together with a group of young students, rebelled and stood up to the teachers in a nonviolent revolution of techniques and practices, probably because he was the oldest among them. Painting 'from nature', recording landscape elements and discovering distinctive regional characteristics and local traditions was crucial, a notion influenced by Almeida Garrett's 1846 book Viagens na minha terra [Travels in My Homeland]. He immediately earned the respect of his peers. While this was thought to inspire Romantic painting en plein air, documentary evidence shows that the studio remained the primary location for painting, leading to these works being referred to as "Landscapes behind closed doors".

== Style ==
Did the Romantics in Portugal paint outside? Or did they, on the contrary, recreate idyllic vistas in the privacy of their own studios? To answer these problems, "The Crossing Borders Project", an interdisciplinary study that includes modern sources as well as art historical and scientific examination, began research on this period in Portugal. The findings currently show that the Romantic paintings studied in this study were unlikely to have been painted outside.

The importance he placed on drawing as a preparatory study for painting – the detailed representation of reality on paper – was decisive in his work, and it was a fundamental element learned in his introductory classes in architecture at the Arsenal's Sala do Risco and in draughtsman ship at the Natural History Museum. Beginning as a defiant Academy student, Anunciaço went on to advocate for the painting of landscapes, customs, and animals, and was regarded as the leader of the new romantic generation, which included Francisco Metrass, Joo Cristino da Silva, José Rodrigues, and Victor Bastos, and was drawn to painting 'd'après nature', such as in the case of Na eira [On the Sea].

His enthusiasm for painting landscapes and customs persisted in modern art, as well as in the works and lectures of Silva Porto, who succeeded Anunciaço as a teacher at the Academy of Fine Arts after his death.

The two most important parts of Anunciaço's artistic imagery are animal art and landscape, through which he established his "silent revolution". The environment is reduced to a scenography backdrop that was captured "in nature" but created in the studio. Anunciaço grew in this area, particularly following his only brief time in Paris, which came near the end of a lauded career (1867). He encountered outstanding French animal artists like R. Bonheur and, in particular, Troyon there. His good effect can be seen in this artwork, in which the light takes on a positive meaning. The vista broadens as the small clearing to the right opens up, and the picture takes on a more "Naturalist" feel. This is one of the first Portuguese representations of the Barbizon style, which would only be adopted by the following generation with better knowledge and a modern attitude.

== Work ==
Tomás da Anunciaço's work has been auctioned several times, with realized prices ranging from $319 to $8,535 USD depending on the size and medium of the piece. Coq et poules picorant; Poules et canards s'abreuvant, sold at Kapandji Morhange in 2017, set the record for this artist at auction since 2013. In 1879, the artist passed away.

== Past career ==
According to Joo Vaz (1859-1931), a student of Anunciaço, Academy students were not encouraged to paint outside. Indeed, according to Vaz, one tree in the Academy's courtyard served as a model for far too many landscape paintings as well as in archival records from the Fine Arts Academy of Lisbon, a shed was built in the academy's courtyard to house hired models such as cows, horses, lambs, and goats.

Anunciaço and da Silva had their own studios at the Academy because they were teachers. Despite the fact that it was characterized as dimly lighted and lacking in heat, it was there that they spent the majority of their time.

Plein-air painting, as Ann Hoeningswald points out, necessitated a high level of speed in order to capture the moment and the changing quality of light. As can be seen from the cross sections of Anunciaço's painting Vista da Penha de França and observations of the painting surface, it was created using a defined layering process in accordance with current painting manual recommendations. The final paint and glazes are applied after a layer of a consistent, neutral colour.

== Death ==
In 1879, the artist passed away. He died of a apoplexy at the age of 60, single and childless, at his home in Rua dos Mouros, number 64, in Lisbon. The funeral was held on the 5th in the Alto de So Joo Cemetery, where he was buried in the number 1416. The event made the front pages of most Portuguese newspapers at the time.
