= 1867 in Portugal =

- Centuries: 17th; 18th; 19th; 20th; 21st
- Decades: 1840s; 1850s; 1860s; 1870s; 1880s
- See also: List of years in Portugal

Events in the year 1867 in Portugal.

== Incumbents ==
- Monarch: Louis I
- Prime Minister: Joaquim António de Aguiar

== Events ==
Death penalty was abolished for civil crimes except treason in time of war.

== Births ==
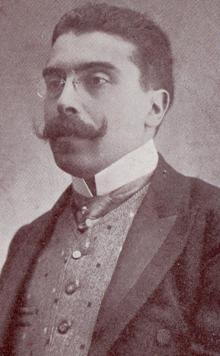
Augusto de Vasconcelos

- 25 January – Adelaide Cabete, women's rights activist (died 1935)
- 23 March – José Norton de Matos, military officer and politician (died 1955)
- 24 September – Augusto de Vasconcelos, surgeon, politician and diplomat (died 1951).
