= 1861 in Portugal =

- Centuries: 17th; 18th; 19th; 20th; 21st
- Decades: 1840s; 1850s; 1860s; 1870s; 1880s
- See also: List of years in Portugal

Events in the year 1861 in Portugal.

== Incumbents ==
- Monarch: Peter V (until 11 November); Luís I (from 22 December)
- Prime Minister: Nuno José Severo de Mendoça Rolim de Moura Barreto, 1st Duke of Loulé

== Events ==
- 22 April - Legislative election.

== Deaths ==
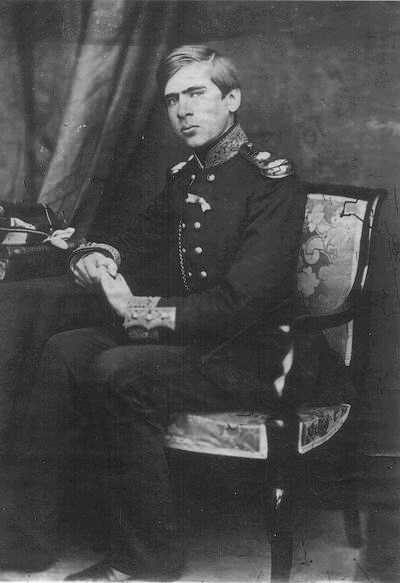
Pedro V of Portugal

- 11 November – Pedro V of Portugal, king (born 1837)
