= 1860 in Portugal =

- Centuries: 17th; 18th; 19th; 20th; 21st
- Decades: 1840s; 1850s; 1860s; 1870s; 1880s
- See also: List of years in Portugal

Events in the year 1860 in Portugal.

== Incumbents ==
- Monarch: Peter V
- Prime Minister: António José Severim de Noronha, 1st Duke of Terceira; Joaquim António de Aguiar; Nuno José Severo de Mendoça Rolim de Moura Barreto, 1st Duke of Loulé

== Events ==
- 1 January - Legislative election.
- 1 May – Joaquim António de Aguiar takes over as Prime Minister, succeeding António José Severim de Noronha, 1st Duke of Terceira
- 4 July – Nuno José Severo de Mendoça Rolim de Moura Barreto, 1st Duke of Loulé takes over as Prime Minister, succeeding Joaquim António de Aguiar

== Births ==
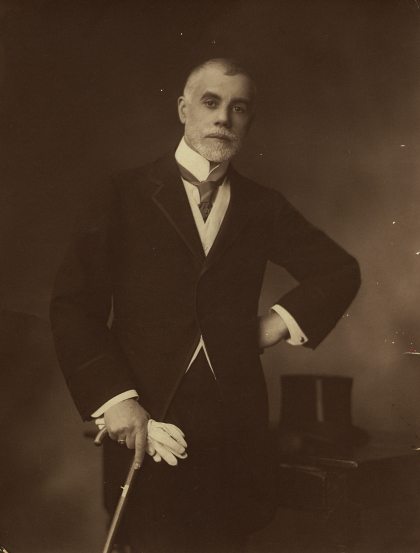
Manuel Teixeira Gomes

- 27 May – Manuel Teixeira Gomes, writer and politician (died 1941)

== Deaths ==
- 8 February – António Augusto Soares de Passos, poet (born 1826)
- 1 June – José Jorge Loureiro, soldier and politician (born 1791)
