= 1857 in Portugal =

- Centuries: 17th; 18th; 19th; 20th; 21st
- Decades: 1830s; 1840s; 1850s; 1860s; 1870s
- See also: List of years in Portugal

Events in the year 1857 in Portugal.

== Incumbents ==
- Monarch: Peter V
- Prime Minister: Nuno José Severo de Mendoça Rolim de Moura Barreto, 1st Duke of Loulé

== Births ==
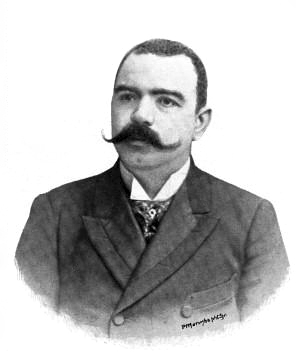
António Teixeira de Sousa

- 6 March – Manuel Maria Coelho, military officer and politician (died 1943).
- 5 May – António Teixeira de Sousa, medical doctor and politician (d. 1917).
- 7 May – Fialho de Almeida, writer and journalist (d. 1911).
