= São João de Areias =

- Civil parish
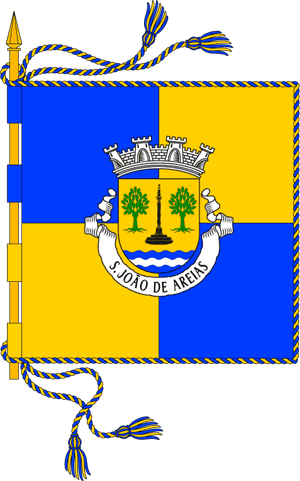
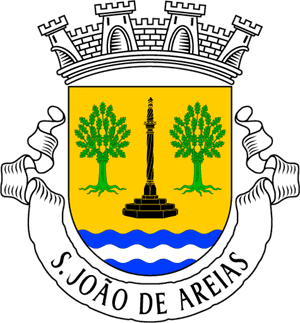
- Flag Coat of arms

- Location in Portugal
- Coordinates: 40.388°N 8.069°W
- Country: Portugal
- Region: Centro
- Intermunic. comm.: Viseu Dão Lafões
- District: Viseu
- Municipality: Santa Comba Dão

Area
  - Total: 21.51 km^{2} (8.31 sq mi)

Population (2011)
  - Total: 1,939
  - Density: 90/km^{2} (230/sq mi)
- Time zone: UTC+00:00 (WET)
  - Summer (DST): UTC+01:00 (WEST)
- Postal code: 3440
- Area code: 232
- Patron: São João Baptista

São João de Areias is a Portuguese civil parish in the municipality (concelho) of Santa Comba Dão, in the former-district of Viseu. The population in 2011 was 1,939, in an area of 21.51 km^{2}.

== History ==
A curious legend attributes the name São João de Areias to the apparition of John the Baptist on the banks of the Mondego River. An old woman, upon seeing this vision yelled out Boa Nova! Boa Nova!, so the area was named Nova. Following public notice, the local residents proceeded in procession to their church. Being an image of John the Baptist and owing to the apparition occurring along the sandbank, the town started being referred to as São João de (or das) Areias (Saint John of the Sands).

The town of São João de Areias was a municipal seat from 1514 to 1895, when its municipality was divided between Santa Comba Dão and Carregal do Sal municipalities. The locality of São João de Areias, which had vila (town) status possibly since the Middle Ages, eventually lost that title after the extinction of its municipality.

São João de Areias only recovered its title of town in the summer of 1997 (following the publication of Law 70/97).

The area of São João de Areias was occupied since remote history, from archaeological evidence encountered throughout this region's history, including graves and vestiges of the Roman occupation.

Documents from the 10th and 12th century identify the lands of São João de Areias as being donated by the Monastery of Lorvão to the Sé Cathedral of Coimbra and Sé Cathedral of Viseu. From this point forward the territory of this parish encompassed the towns of Silvares, São João de Areias and Parada.

During the 18th and 19th centuries, São João de Areias was referred to in the Inquiries of Afonso III and other documents of the royal chancellery.

At the beginning of the 16th century (10 April 1514 specifically) Manuel I conceded a foral (charter), resulting in the building of the pillory of São João de Areias. The regal population cadastral document for 1527, indicated that the municipality of São João de Areias included the parishes of São João and Parada. Silvares was the seat of a small municipality, alongside that of São João de Areias, where 25 inhabitants (13 in Silvares, eight in Casal and four in Venda [da Guarita]) had homes. Sometime between the 15th and 16th centuries there was a growth in the construction of religious buildings, that would repeat itself in the 18th century. Seven chapels were constructed during this epoch, and dedicated to São Sebastião, São Pedro, São Silvestre, São João Evangelista, Santo António and São Miguel, in addition to a chapel to Nossa Senhora da Graça, and later the chapels dedicated to São José and São Francisco (no Casal).

During the middle of the 17th century, the municipalities of São João de Areias and Silvares was composed of a municipality governed by Presiding Judge, Councilmen (three for São João de Areias and one for Silvares) and an attorney by district Magistrates letter and named His Majesty. This situation continued until the preceding centuries, until the municipality's extinction.

== Geography ==
- S. João de Areias
- Prados
- Vila Dianteira
- Casas Novas
- Cernada
- Castelejo
- Casal
- Silvares
- Guarita
- S. Miguel
- Cancela
- Fonte do Ouro
- Campolinho
- Vale Pinheiro
- Póvoa dos Mosqueiros
- Quintas: Quinta do Borges & Irmão; Quinta da Mascota; Quinta da Levegada (Cancela), etc.

== Architecture ==
=== Civic ===
- Casa das Armas Reais - São João de Areias
- Casa de D.ª Georgina Loureiro - Vila Dianteira
- Casa do Dr. José da Silva Carvalho - Vila Dianteira
- Solar dos Serpa Pimentel - Guarita
- Casa dos Neves de Lemos - Póvoa dos Mosqueiros
- Pillory of São João de Areias (Pelourinho de São João das Areias)

=== Religious ===
- Chapel of Senhora da Graça (Capela da Senhora da Graça)
- Chapel of Cristo (Capela de Santo Cristo)
- Chapel of São João Evangelista (Capela de São João Evangelista)
- Chapel of São Miguel (Capela de São Miguel)
- Chapel of São Pedro (Capela de São Pedro)
- Church of São João Baptista (Igreja Matriz de São João de Areias/Igreja de São João Baptista), the 18th-century parochial church of São João de Areias

== Notable citizens ==
- José da Silva Carvalho (1782–1856), labourer of the 1820 Revolution and minister of D. João VI, of D. Pedro IV, and of D.ª Maria II.
- Francisco de Serpa Saraiva (1781–1850), first Baron of São João de Areias.
- Manuel de Serpa Pimentel (1818–1910), second Baron of São João de Areias.
