= Joaquim Casimiro =

Portuguese musician (1808–1862)

Joaquim Casimiro Júnior (30 May 1808 in Lisbon – 28 December 1862) was a Portuguese composer and organist. He composed a number of operas and operettas, as well as much sacred music.

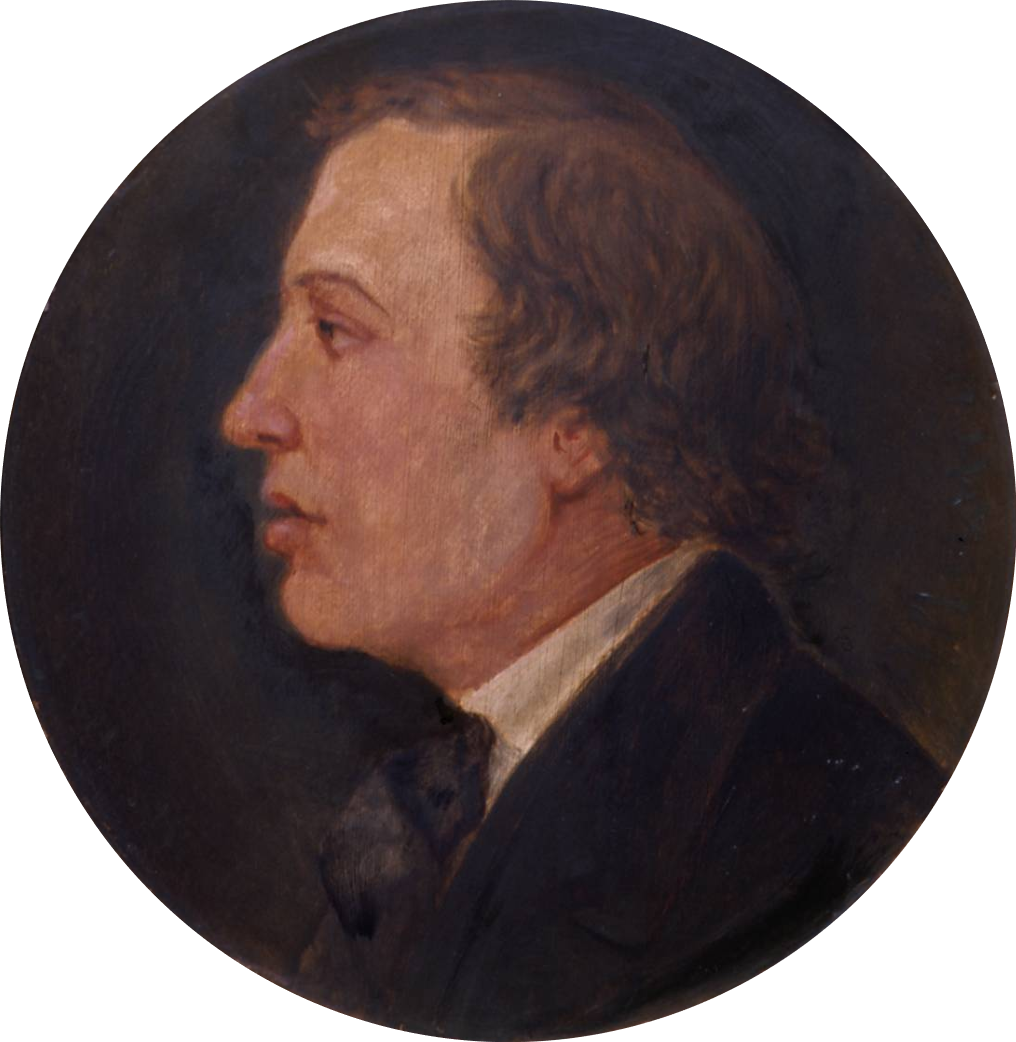
The portrait of the Portuguese composer, Joaquim Casimiro (1808-1862)
