= 1856 Portuguese legislative election =

- 9 November 1856

All 162 seats in the Chamber of Deputies 82 seats needed for a majority
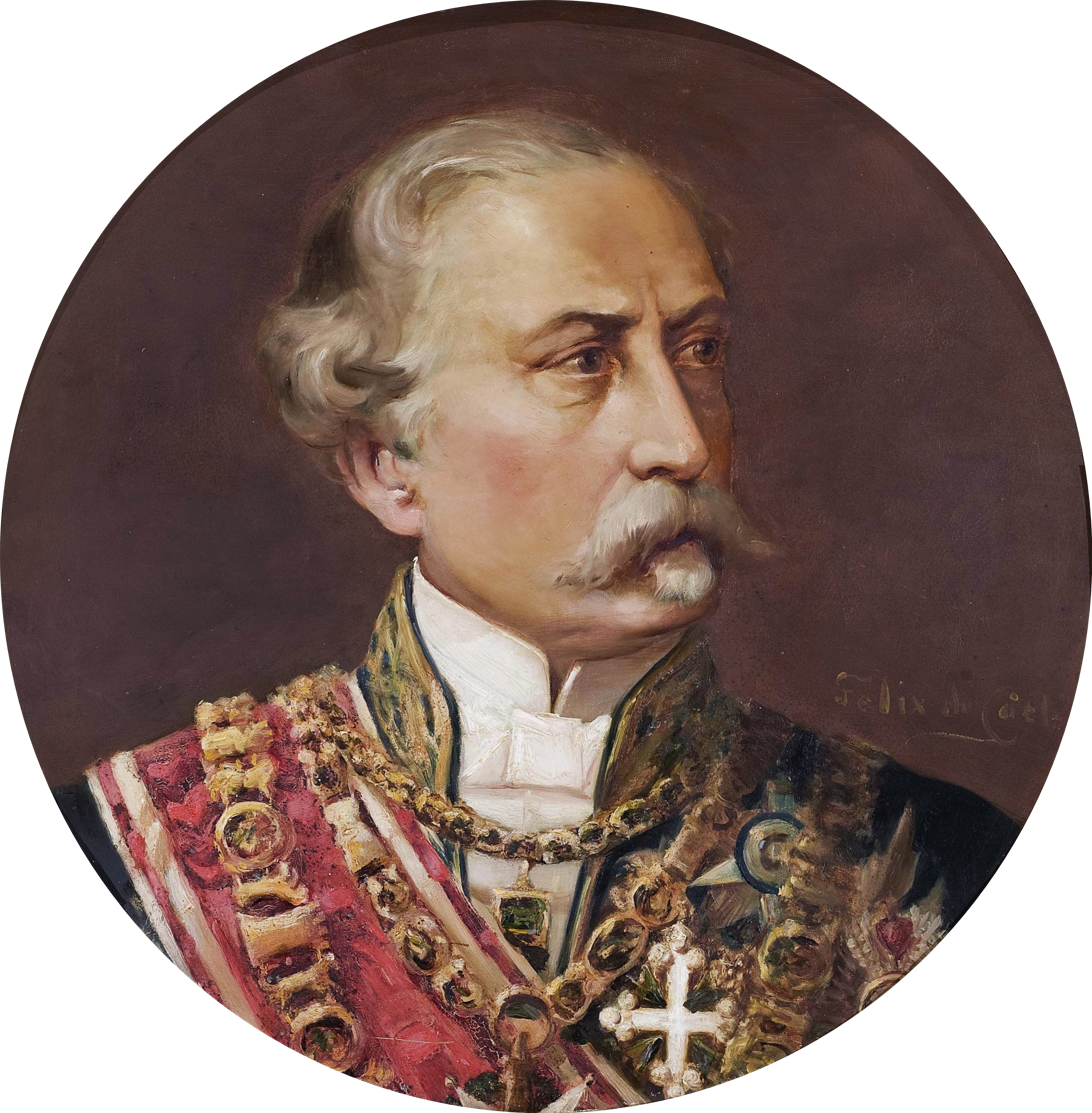

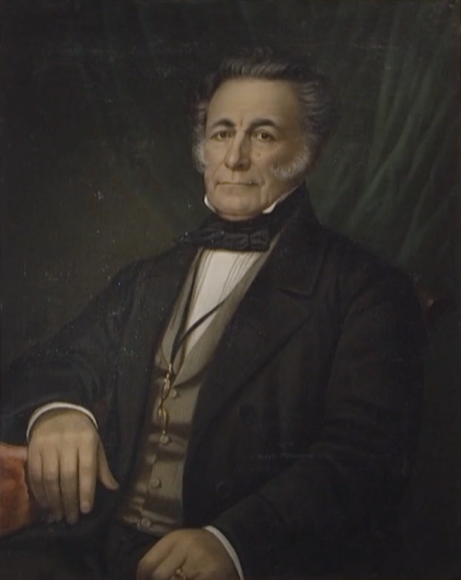

| | First party | Second party | Third party |
|---|---|---|---|
| Leader | 1st Duke of Loulé | Rodrigo da Fonseca Magalhães |
| Party | Historic | Regenerator | Miguelistas |
| Last election | – | 121 seats | – |
| Seats won | 116 | 41 | 5 |
| Seats after | New | ▼80 | New |
Prime Minister before election
1st Duke of Loulé
Historic
Prime Minister after election
1st Duke of Loulé
Historic

Legislative elections were held in Portugal on 9 November 1856.

== Results ==
The elected Miguelistas did not take their oath of office.

| Party | Seats | +/– |
|---|---|---|
| Historic Party | 116 | New |
| Regenerator Party | 41 | –79 |
| Miguelistas | 5 | New |
| **Total** | **162** | **+8** |
Source: ISCSP

=== Results by constituency ===
The minutes of the preparatory session of the Chamber of Deputies held on 19 January 1857, at which the credentials committees presented their reports, record the voting in some constituencies. Once the verification was complete, the president of the preparatory session proclaimed the deputies whose credentials had been approved.

In the tables below, the percentage shows the proportion of the constituency's voters who voted for each candidate, and elected candidates are shown in bold. Each elector in a multi-member constituency could vote for more than one candidate.

==== Sintra ====
The constituency of Sintra returned two deputies and had eight polling assemblies and 2,081 voters.

Sintra (2 seats)
| Party | Candidate | Votes | % |
|---|---|---|---|
| | **Lourenço Correia Manuel de Carvalho e Aboim** | **1,137** | **54.64** |
| | **Francisco de Sena Fernandes** | **978** | **47.00** |
| | Frederico Guilherme da Silva Pereira | 791 | 38.01 |
| | Torquato Máximo de Almeida | 667 | 32.05 |
| Turnout | | 2,081 | |

The Sintra election was disputed. The committee noted irregularities at the assemblies of Mafra, where thirteen officers of the 1st Infantry Regiment registered in the municipality of Belém had voted; Gradil, where 101 ballots written on wavy-edged, cut paper had been counted although they should have been declared void; and Montelavar, where one elector protested against bribery and coercion allegedly carried out by parish magistrates (regedores). Since the two elected candidates would have kept their majority even if the disputed votes were deducted, the committee recommended that the election be approved. A motion by José Maria do Casal Ribeiro to adjourn the matter so that a parliamentary inquiry could be held into the alleged abuses of the administrator of the municipality of Mafra was rejected, and the report was approved.

==== Funchal ====
The constituency of Funchal returned four deputies, and the tallying assembly counted 4,189 voters. The election took place without protests or complaints.

Funchal (4 seats)
| Party | Candidate | Votes | % |
|---|---|---|---|
| | **José Silvestre Ribeiro** | **2,691** | **64.24** |
| | **António Correia Herédia** | **2,103** | **50.20** |
| | **Luís da Câmara Leme** | **1,683** | **40.18** |
| | **Sebastião Frederico Rodrigues Leal** | **1,592** | **38.00** |
| Turnout | | 4,189 | |

The committee reserved the question of Sebastião Frederico Rodrigues Leal's eligibility for a separate report.

==== Daman and Diu ====
The constituency of Daman and Diu returned one deputy. There were three primary assemblies and no protests against the election were recorded. Apart from the elected candidate, António Afonso Mendes Coutinho received four votes and Avelino José Xavier one vote, both at the Daman assembly.

Daman and Diu (1 seat)
| Party | Candidate | Votes | % |
|---|---|---|---|
| | **António de Azevedo e Cunha** | **2,089** | **99.76** |

==== Goa ====
The constituency of Goa returned three deputies. The minutes do not give the number of voters, so no percentages are shown.

Goa (3 seats)
| Party | Candidate | Votes | % |
|---|---|---|---|
| | **Estêvão Jeremias Mascarenhas** | **5,011** | |
| | **António Afonso Mendes Coutinho** | **4,210** | |
| | **Bernardo Francisco da Costa** | **4,049** | |
| | Sebastião Salvador Cana | 3,997 | |
| | Joaquim Manuel de Melo Mendonça | 3,749 | |
| | Caetano Francisco Pereira Garcez | 251 | |

The committee reserved for a separate report the election of António Afonso Mendes Coutinho, judge of the district of Bardez, against whose eligibility protests had been lodged at several assemblies.

==== Angola ====
The constituency of Angola returned two deputies and had 1,432 voters.

Angola (2 seats)
| Party | Candidate | Votes | % |
|---|---|---|---|
| | **Francisco Soares Franco** | **778** | **54.33** |
| | **Carlos Possolo de Sousa** | **589** | **41.13** |
| | António Joaquim de Castro | 383 | 26.75 |
| | Simão José da Luz Soriano | 315 | 22.00 |
| Turnout | | 1,432 | |

The original minutes were lost in the wreck of the brig Oriente, and the election was verified from certified copies.
