= 1865 Portuguese legislative election =

- 8 July 1865

All 177 seats in the Chamber of Deputies 89 seats needed for a majority
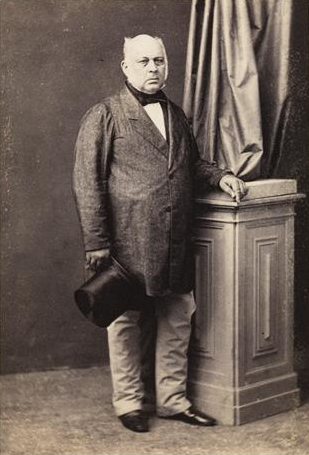

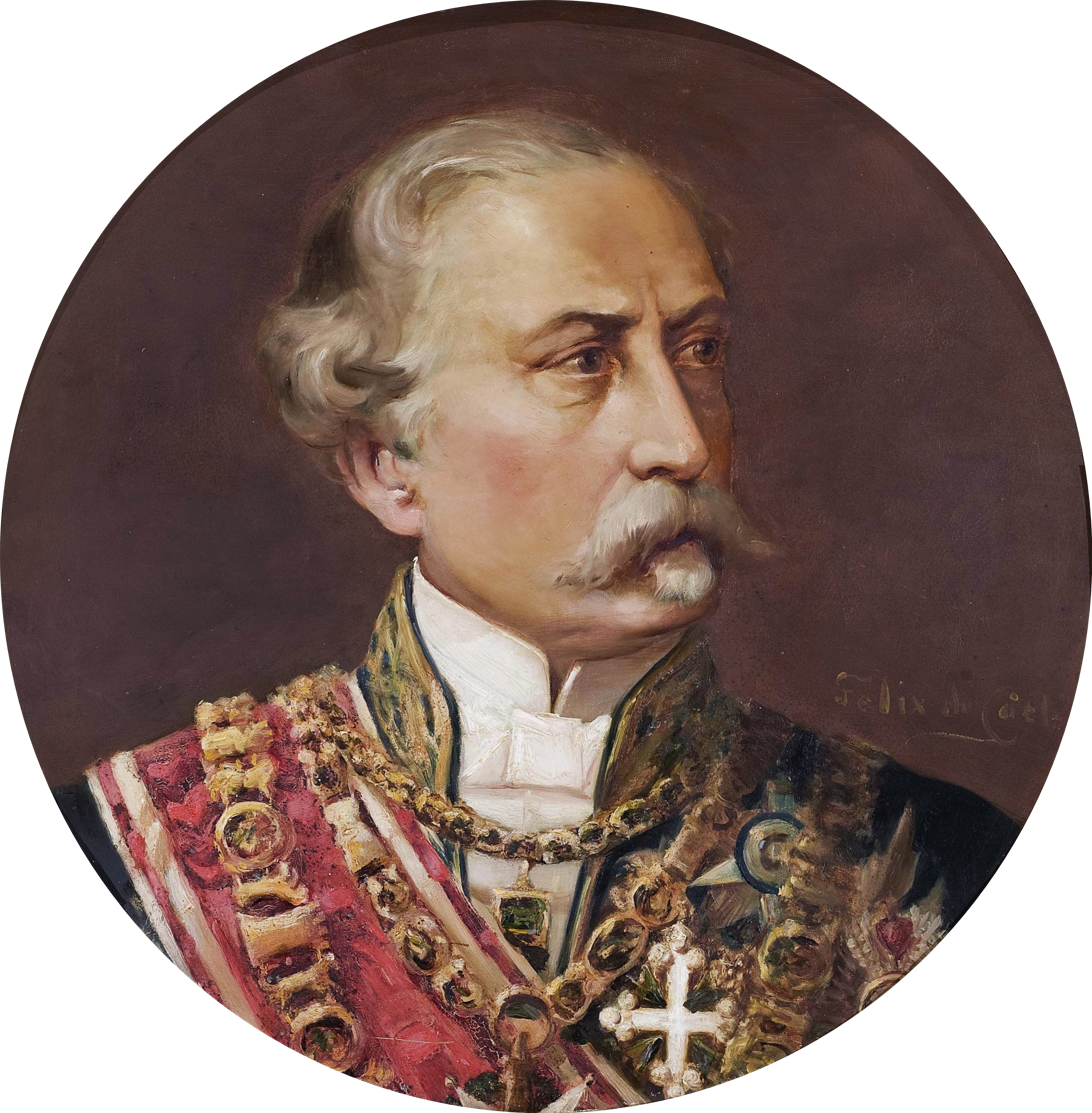
	First party	Second party
Leader	Joaquim António de Aguiar	1st Duke of Loulé
Party	Progressives	Anti-Progressives
Seats won	130	47
Prime Minister before election
1st Marquis of Sá da Bandeira
Reformist
Prime Minister after election
Joaquim António de Aguiar
Regenerator

Parliamentary elections were held in Portugal on 8 July 1865.

== Results ==
Party	Votes	%	Seats
Progressive Electoral Commission			130
Anti-Progressive Electoral Commission			47
Total			177
Total votes	239,060	–	
Registered voters/turnout	331,921	72.02	
Source: ISCSP, Nohlen & Stöver
