= Guilherme Ivens Ferraz =

Portuguese Navy officer

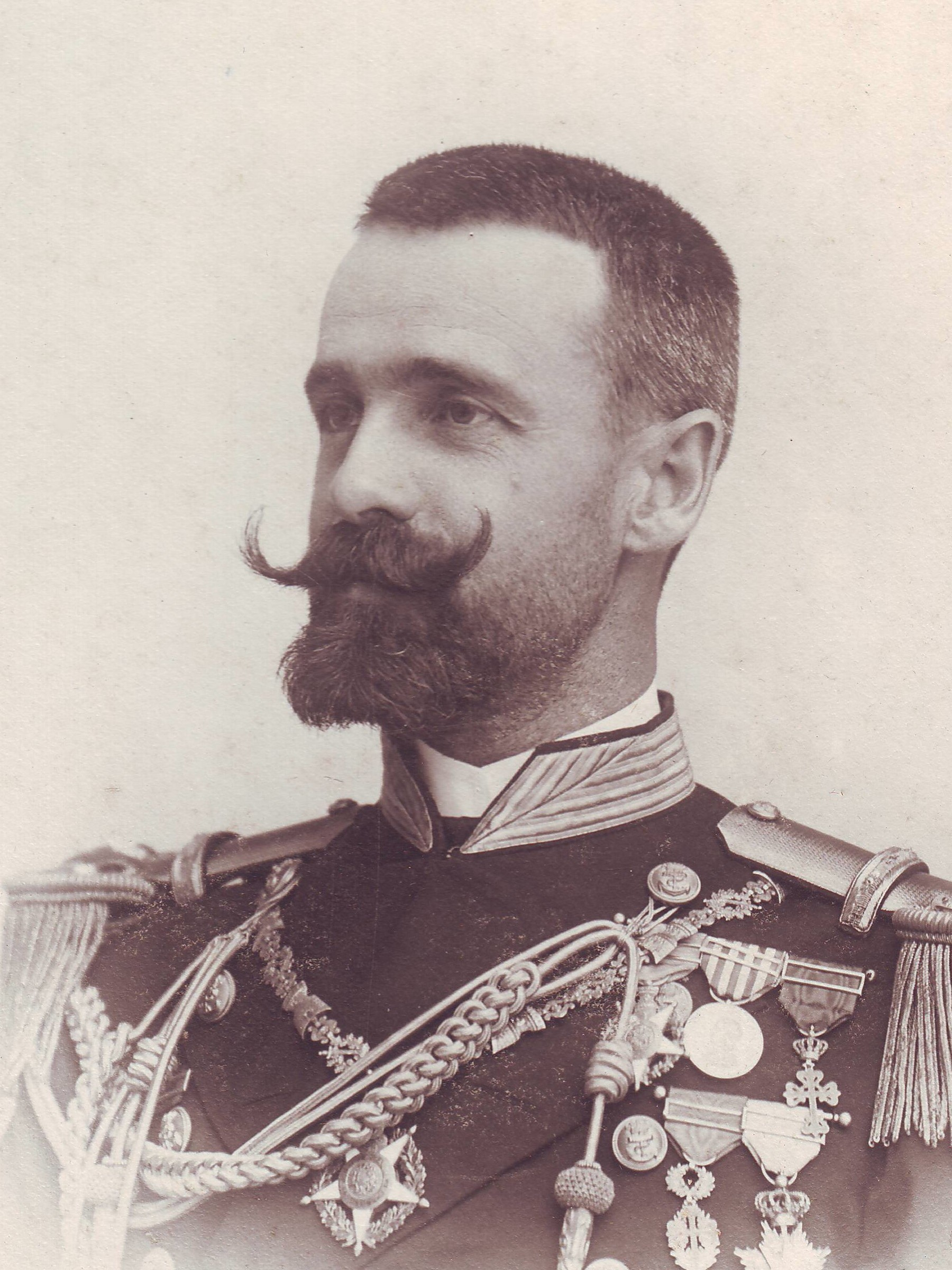
Guilherme Ivens Ferraz in 1900

Vice Admiral Guilherme Ivens Ferraz (14 September 1865, in Ponta Delgada – 26 December 1956, in Lisbon) was a Portuguese Navy officer.

== Early life ==
Son of the engineer Ricardo Júlio Ferraz and his wife Catherine Prescott Hickling Ivens, he had five brothers and one sister. He attended the Royal Military College between 1878 and 1883, the Escola Politécnica and the Naval School.

== Military career ==
Serving as a junior naval officer in Mozambique, he was engaged in the repression of slave boats, the occupation of Tungue, the survey and marking of the rivers Pungwe and Buzi, the reconnaissance of the bay of Bazaruto and the study of the river Chinde. He was appointed head of the Bazaruto Pearl Fishery Company in 1892. From 1894 to 1895, he distinguished himself as commander of the river gunboat Sabre in the campaign of Lourenço Marques against the Gaza rebellion. For his services in this campaign, he was made Officer of the Order of the Tower and Sword and granted a pension. He was also elevated to the military house of King Carlos I of Portugal.

Ivens Ferraz served as secretary of the High Commissioner of Mozambique, António Enes (1895), port captain of Lourenço Marques (1895-1899) and, by designation of Mouzinho de Albuquerque, mayor of Lourenço Marques (1897). In 1899, he was appointed commissioner of the Portuguese government in the delimitation of Anglo-Portuguese borders in Central Africa. Later, he wrote a description of the coast of Mozambique and, as commander of the gunboat Bengo, undertook further surveys in Moebase and Nacala. In 1907, he was technical delegate to the Hague Peace Conference.

During the First World War, Ivens Ferraz was chairman of the committee in charge of the transport of Portuguese troops to Brest and Cherbourg. In 1925-1927, he was commander-in-chief of the Portuguese naval forces in the Far-East in the cruiser República, assisting the international force assembled in Shanghai during the anti-foreign incidents in China. On his return, he was promoted to Rear admiral and, in 1930, appointed Chief of the Naval Staff, retiring in 1931.

== Other activities ==
Like other officers of the African campaigns, Ivens Ferraz joined the Liberal Regenerator Party in 1903 and was elected to parliament in 1906. In his later life, he was president of the Portuguese Red Cross from 1942 to 1948.
