= 1819 in Brazil =

Events in the year 1819 in Brazil.

== Incumbents ==
- Monarch – King John VI of Portugal

== Births ==
- April 4 - Maria II, Queen of Portugal
