= Santa Comba Dão =

- Municipality
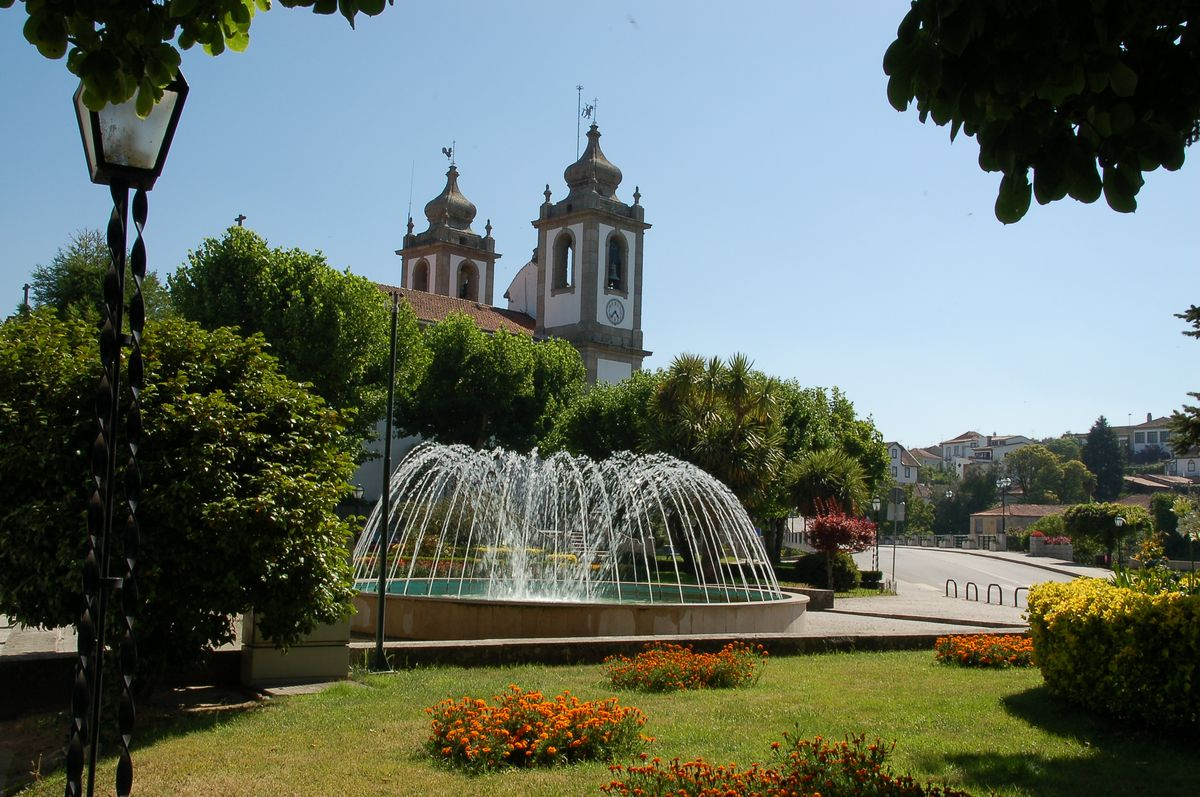
- Street in Santa Comba Dão

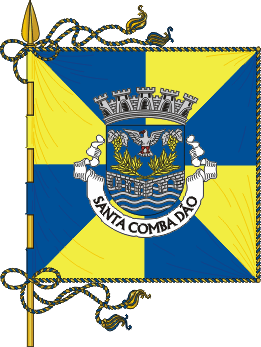
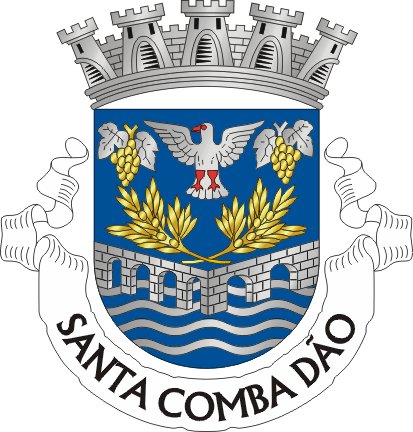
- Flag Coat of arms
- Interactive map of Santa Comba Dão
- Coordinates: 40°24′N 8°07′W
- Country: Portugal
- Region: Centro
- Intermunic. comm.: Viseu Dão Lafões
- District: Viseu
- Parishes: 6

Government
  - President: Leonel Gouveia (PS)

Area
  - Total: 111.95 km^{2} (43.22 sq mi)

Population (2011)
  - Total: 11,597
  - Density: 103.59/km^{2} (268.30/sq mi)
- Time zone: UTC+00:00 (WET)
  - Summer (DST): UTC+01:00 (WEST)
- Local holiday: Ascension Day date varies
- Website: www.cm-santacombadao.pt

Santa Comba Dão (European Portuguese pronunciation: [ˈsɐ̃tɐ ˈkõbɐ ˈðɐ̃w]) is a city and a municipality in the Viseu District in Portugal. The population in 2011 was 11,597, in an area of 111.95 km^{2}. The city proper has a population of 3,300.

The present mayor is Leonel Gouveia, elected in 2013 by Socialist Party. The municipal holiday is Ascension Day.

António de Oliveira Salazar, the leader of Portugal from 1932 to 1968 and founder of the Estado Novo, was born in Vimieiro, Santa Comba Dão on 28 April 1889 to a rural family of modest income.

The town's station was formerly a terminus of the Dão line to/from Viseu. This narrow gauge railway opened in 1890 and was closed to passengers in 1988.

Santa Comba Dão was granted city status in 1999. In the mid-2000s, serial killer António Luís Costa murdered three young women in the municipality.

== Parishes ==
Administratively, the municipality is divided into six civil parishes (freguesias):

- Ovoa e Vimieiro
- Pinheiro de Ázere
- Santa Comba Dão e Couto do Mosteiro
- São Joaninho
- São João de Areias
- Treixedo e Nagozela

== Notable people ==
- José Maria de Sousa Macedo Almeida e Vasconcelos, 1st Baron of Santa Comba Dão (1787-1872), nobleman, military leader and politician
- José Maria de Sousa Horta e Costa (1858–1927), soldier, politician, diplomat and colonial Governor of Macau 1894-97 & 1900-02 and 113th Governor-General of India 1907-10
- António Luís Costa (1953), Portuguese serial killer
- António de Oliveira Salazar (1889 in Vimieiro – 1970), statesman, dictator, and economist, leader of Portugal as Chairman of the Council of Ministers from 1932 to 1968. He was responsible for the Estado Novo ("New State")
- João Coimbra (born 1986), former footballer with 296 club appearances
