= José Rodrigues =

Portuguese painter (1828–1887)

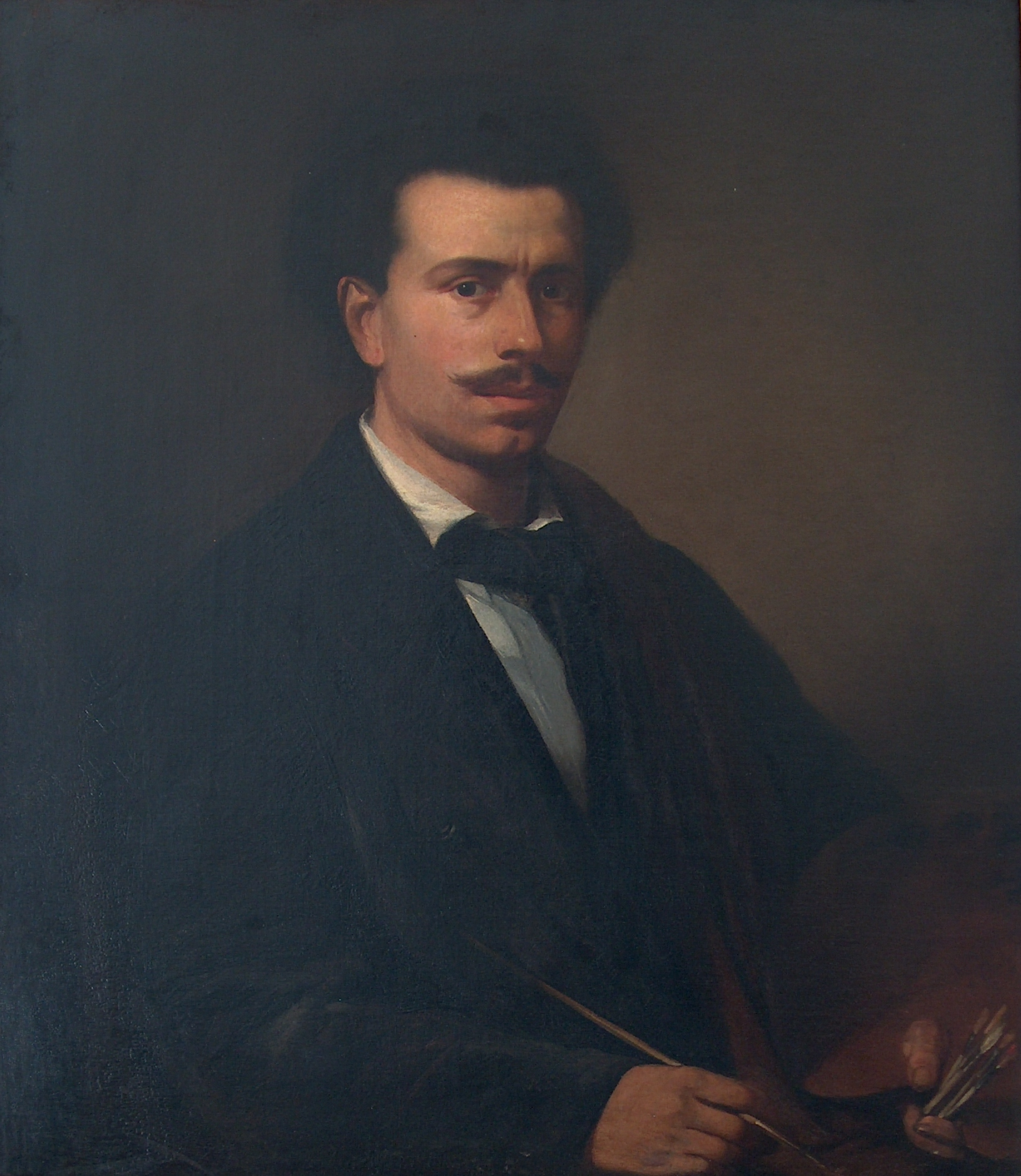
- Self portrait of José Rodrigues
- Born: José Rodrigues de Carvalho; 16 July 1828; Lisbon, Portugal
- Died: 18 February 1887 (aged 58); Lisbon, Portugal
- Education: Academy of Fine Arts
- Known for: painting
- Notable work: O Pobre Rabequista
- Movement: Realism
- Awards: by the Queen Dona Maria II – Gold medal Academy of Fine Arts – Gold medal Portuguese Industrial Association – Silver Medal Academic of Merit – Academy of Fine Arts

José Rodrigues de Carvalho (16 July 1828 – 19 October 1887) was a Portuguese painter.

O Pobre Rabequista (The poor rabequista), painted in 1855 and considered Rodriques' most famous work, was first shown in Paris at the Universal Exhibition in 1855 and at the International Exposition of Porto in 1865, where he won the award for second place.

== Early life ==
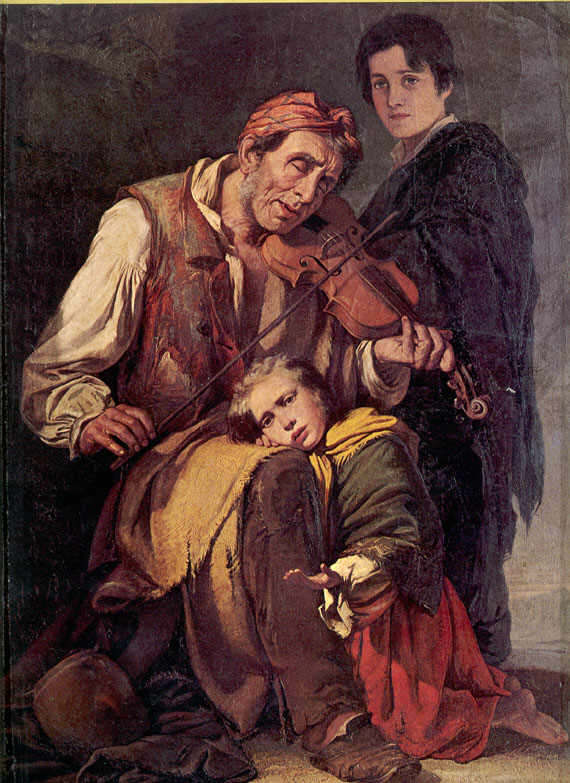
O Pobre Rabequista by José Rodrigues

José Rodrigues was the, son of Apolinário José de Carvalho and Maria Leonarda. He was baptised in São João da Praça, Lisbon, on 21 September 1828. His godfather was also José Rodrigues.

Rodrigues had five brothers and lived at the "Rua dos Bacalhoeiros" in Lisbon. He married José Maria Rodrigues, daughter of José Rodrigues da Rocha, in 1863 and had three children named António Ribeiro, Teresa de Jesus and Leonor Matilde.

Prior to joining the Academy of Fine Arts at San Francisco Convent as a volunteer student in 1841, he left an engraving dated 1840. In 1842, he won a prize in a drawing competition. The prize was a copy of a bas-relief. From that time on, an engraving signed and dated by José Rodrigues is there.

In 1843, during an exhibition of works by students, he presented a drawing in bas-relief. In that year, the following received an award: Miguel Ângelo Lupi, Angelino da Cruz Castro e Silva, António José Lopes Júnior and Ernesto Gerard.

In 1845/1846, he entered higher education studying historical painting and won an award. In December 1846, he received another award for a life-model drawing.

== Classmates ==
Rodrigues' classmates included João Pedro Monteiro (Monteirinho), Francisco Augusto Metrass, Tomás da Anunciação, Joaquim Pedro de Sousa, and António José Patrício.

== Awards ==
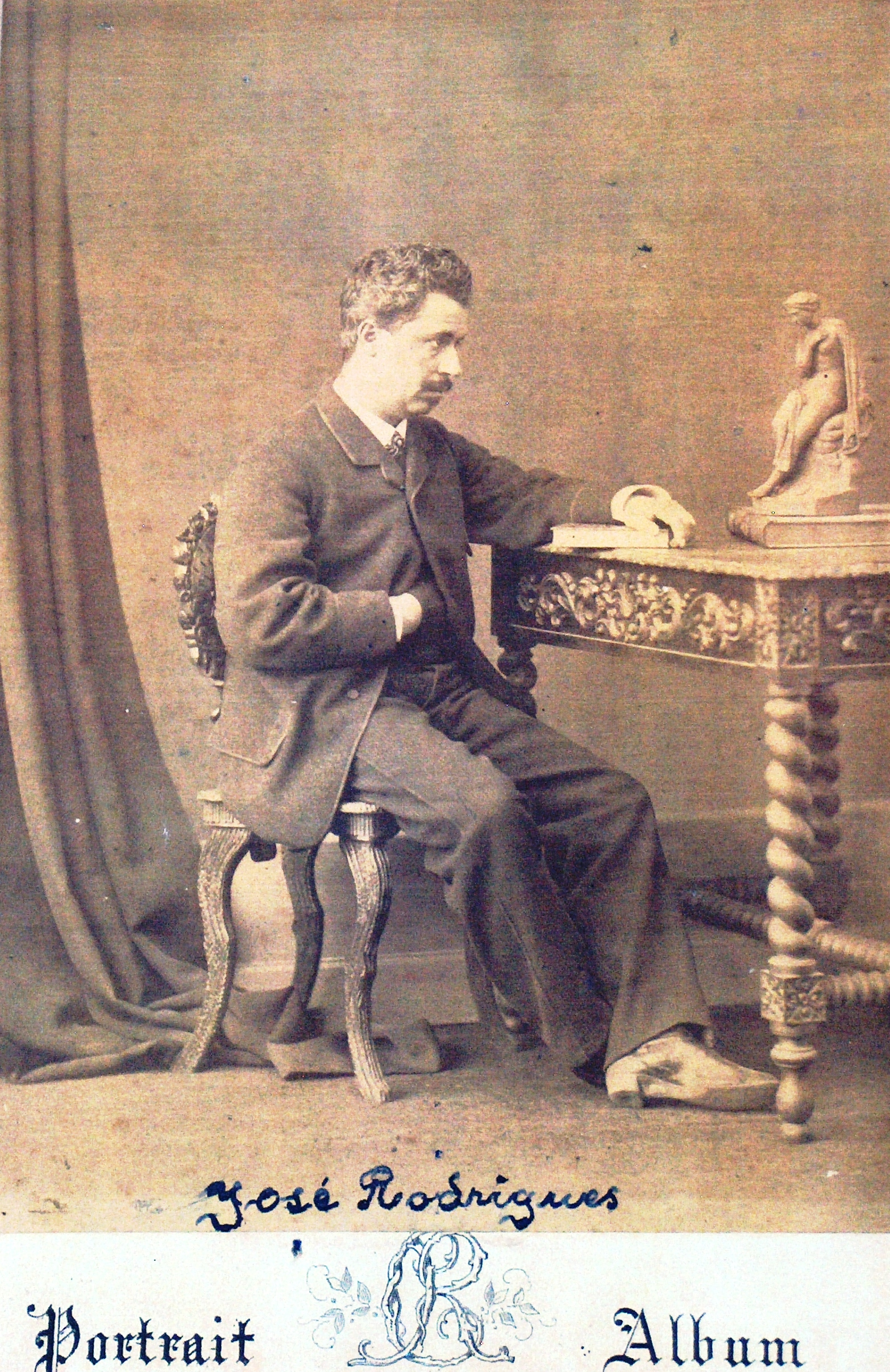

At the triennial exhibition of 1849, he was awarded a gold medal by Queen Dona Maria II.

At its conference in August 1849, the Academy of Fine Arts awarded José Rodrigues with a gold medal for his painting "Aparição do Anjo S. Gabriel ao profeta Daniel".

At an exhibition, promoted by the Portuguese Industrial Association, José Rodrigues received the Silver Medal with honours.

In 1865, he was nominated "Academic of Merit" at the Academy of Fine Arts' General Conference.

On 16 November 1882 the artist entered into an agreement with the City Council of Lisbon for the production of two paintings for the Council's main Meeting Chamber. In the contract, José Rodrigues committed to create two real-life and full-body paintings, of Alexandre Herculano (1810–1877) and Manuel Fernandes Tomás (1771–1822). The contract was signed by the presiding Chairman of the Council, José Gregório da Rosa Araujo and by the artist. The paintings reside in the "Meeting Chamber" of the City Council.

Throughout his life, he was forced to paint portraits in order to survive; which drove him to melancholy and illness. He gave classes at the Irish-owned Monastery of Bom-Sucesso and at S. José das Dominicanas de S. Domingos de Benfica, amongst others.

The artist died at his home in Rua dos Bacalhoeiros, Lisbon, on 19 October 1887.

== Reviews ==
According to José Augusto França, the artist dedicated himself to the painting of customs, within a sphere of sentimental realism and found his work hindered by a difficulty in separating sentimentalism from realism.

== Diverse ==
The works of José Rodrigues and his contemporaries are studied within the subject of 19th Century Art (The Romantic Movement) at the Faculty of Arts of the University of Oporto.

== Selected works ==
=== Oil paintings ===
- The poor of púcara in half body. It belonged to the king D. Fernando
- The poor rabequista (or Blind Rabequista), composition of three figures in natural size. It belonged to the king – Fernando and then to Mr. Conde do Ameal and currently is part of the booty Chiado Museum.
- The malmequer. It belonged to D. Rufina Maria Iglesias of Lima.
- Cliffs of La Mancha. He belonged to the Marquis de Sousa Holstein.
- The old vegetable seller in Sintra. It belonged to the king D. Luis.
- The peasant. It belonged to the king – D. Luis.
- Margins of the Tagus river, around Santarém. It belonged to the king – Luis.
- Lady of Good luck. It belonged to D. Rufina Maria Iglesias of Lima.
- Flowers and fruit; height 1.72 m. It belonged to the king D. Fernando.
- The city, under the roof of the hall of great sessions of the Municipal Council of Lisbon. 5.m long, for 4.m high. 1883.

=== Oil portraits ===
- His Majesty the King – Pedro V, reminiscent, in transparent, to celebrate the Aclamação in Beja.
- Adviser Jose da Silva Carvalho, a copy to Portalegre. 85. Anonymous.
- His Eminence Cardinal Patriarch of Lisbon, D. Manuel Bento Rodrigues, to Braga.
- His Majesty the King – Pedro V, for the hall of the Commerce Square in Lisbon.
- His Majesty the King – Louis to the chamber of capelos the University of Coimbra, part of 3.m tall.
- His Majesty the King – Pedro V (reminiscent of) to school Mafra, order of Madrépora Society of Rio de Janeiro.
- His Majesty the King – Luis, for the Ministry of the Navy to the palace of the Government in Mozambique, part of 2.60 by 1.70 m.
- His Majesty the King – Luis, to the House of deputy.
- His Majesty the King – Pedro V, reminiscent, for the Society of Rio de Janeiro, part of 2.me 50, by 1.me 50.
- Self-portrait of the artist, at nineteen years of age.
- Self-portrait of the painter, dressed in cape and hat.

== Gallery ==
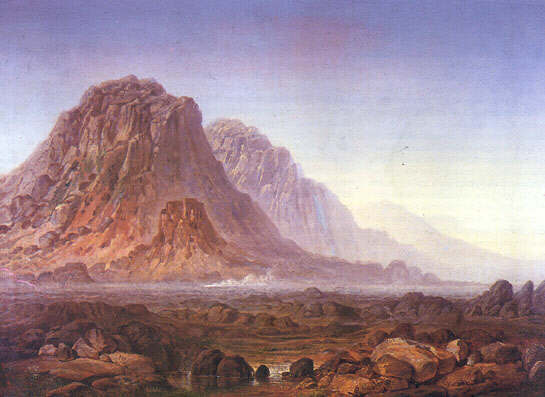
Mancha cliffs0

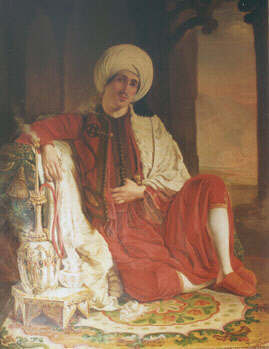
Oriental scene l

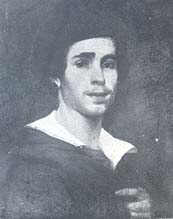
Self Portrait (with cape and hat)

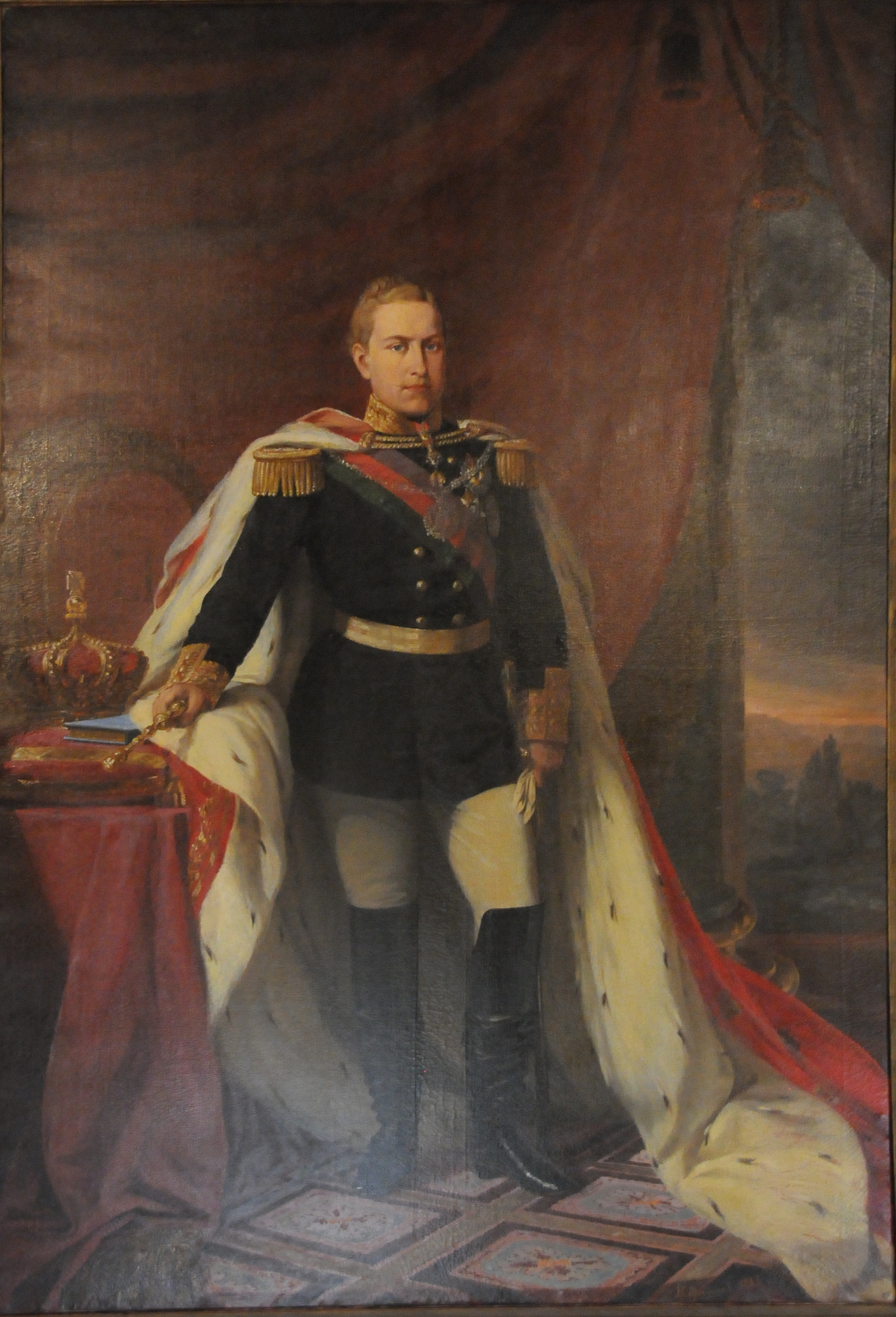
The King D. Luís (1866).

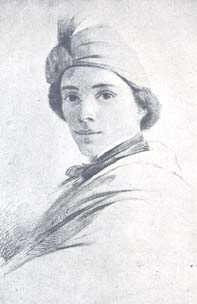
Self Portrait (at nineteen)
