= 1853 in Portugal =

- Centuries: 17th; 18th; 19th; 20th; 21st
- Decades: 1830s; 1840s; 1850s; 1860s; 1870s
- See also: List of years in Portugal

Events in the year 1853 in Portugal.

== Incumbents ==
- Monarch: Mary II (until November 15); Peter V
- Prime Minister: João Carlos Saldanha de Oliveira Daun, 1st Duke of Saldanha

== Events ==
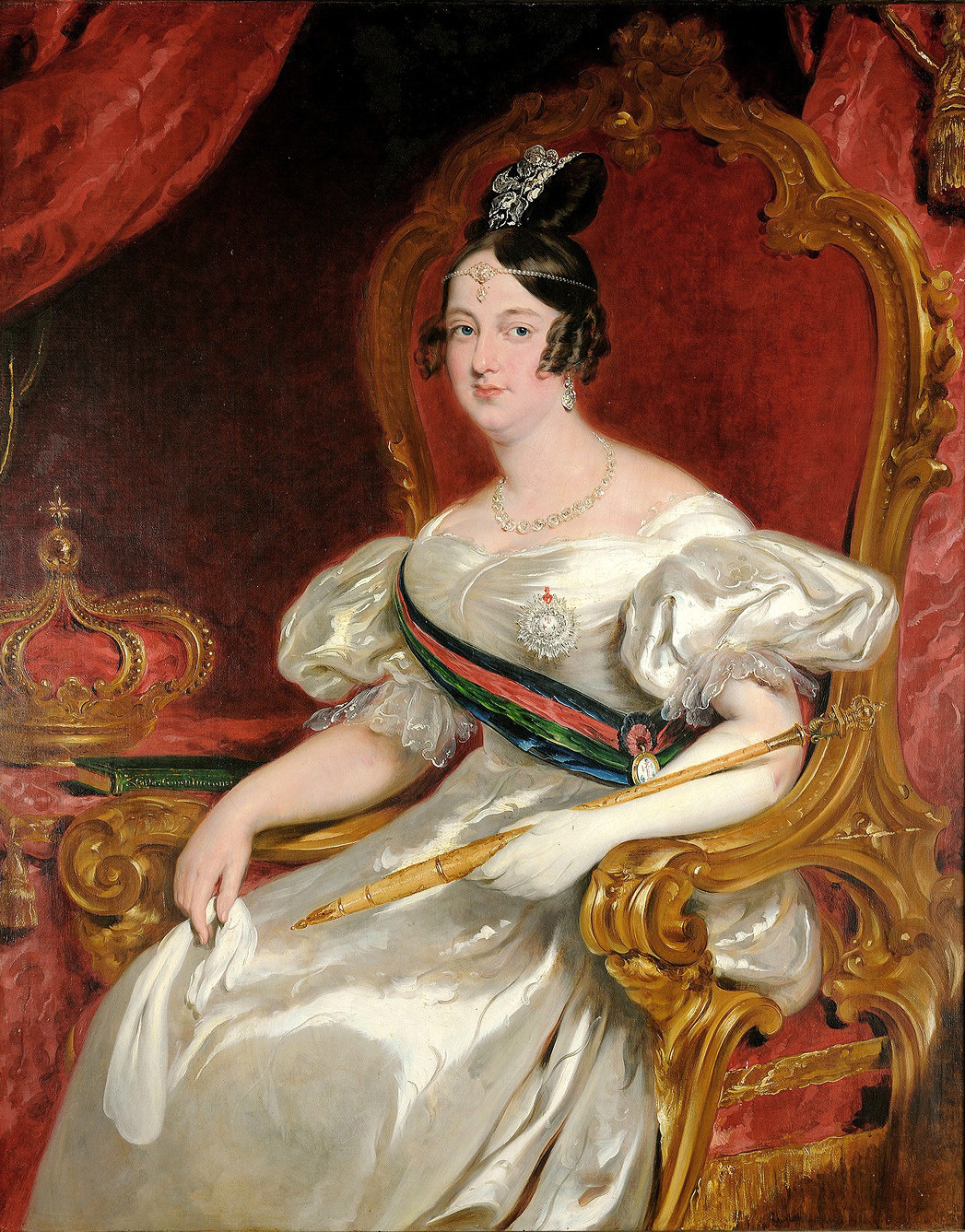
Maria II of Portugal

- 15 November – Queen Maria II of Portugal dies and is succeeded by Pedro V of Portugal.

== Births ==
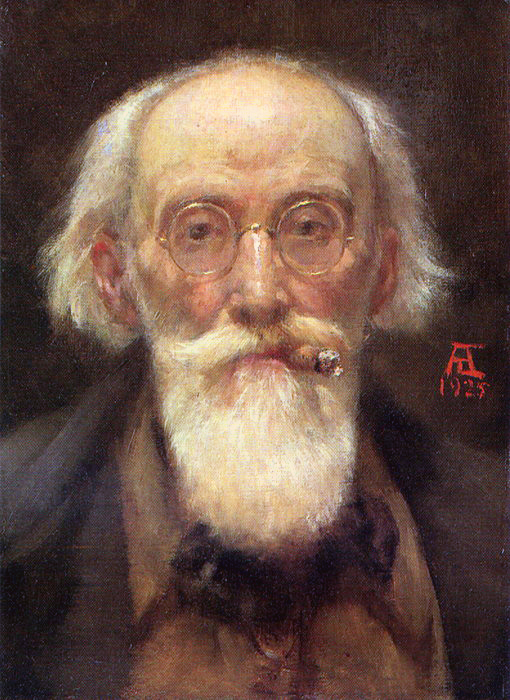
Artur Loureiro

- 11 February – Artur Loureiro, painter (d. 1932).

== Deaths ==
- 15 November – Maria II of Portugal, queen (b. 1819).
