= Amélia dos Santos Costa Cardia =

Portuguese physician, writer and spiritist

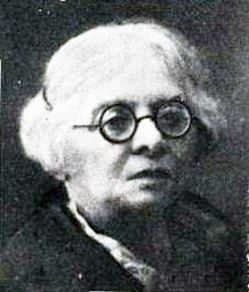
- Amélia dos Santos Costa Cardia
- Born: Lisbon, Kingdom of Portugal

Amélia dos Santos Costa Cardia (1855–1938), born in Lisbon, was one of the first women medical doctors in Portugal. She attended the Polytechnic School from 1883 until 1887, and then attended the Medical-Surgical School of Lisbon, graduating on 20 July 1891. Her doctoral thesis was on yellow fever. She was the first woman in Portugal to work in a hospital internship. She also founded a nursing home which she led for almost ten years, and was part of the National League Against Tuberculosis and Association of Medical Sciences. She also belonged to the Portuguese Spiritist Federation. She was also a writer.

== Publications ==
- Episódios da Guerra, 1919
- Visionário : romance psicológico, 1932
- Pecadora : romance psicológico, 1934
- Alforria : romance psicológico, 1936
