= António Osório Sarmento de Figueiredo Jr. =

Portuguese nobleman, jurist, politician and magistrate

António Osório Sarmento de Figueiredo Jr. (13 March 1855 in Santa Marta de Penaguião – 19 May 1935 in Lisbon) was a Portuguese nobleman, jurist, politician and magistrate.

He was a son of António Osório Sarmento de Figueiredo and Elvira Lucinda Augusta or Luísa Lucinda Augusta Borges Peixoto, both born in Santa Marta de Penaguião, Cumieira. He had an older twin brother named José Osório Sarmento de Figueiredo and a younger brother Afonso Osório Sarmento de Figueiredo (born Santa Marta de Penaguião, Cumieira, 25 June 1856), both without further notice.

== Career ==
He was a Dr. Bachelor graduated in Law from the University of Coimbra, where he was one of the Awarded Student at the Academic Faculties in the lecturing year of 1875 to 1876 and who received their respective Diplomas at the great room of the acts on day 16 October 1876 as 3rd Accessit of the 3rd year of Law and was the 21st enrolled in the 4th year of Law listed as the son of António Osório Sarmento de Figueiredo, from Cumieira, Vila Real District, and living at Rua do Corpo de Deus, n.º 104.

He became a Lawyer.

He was one of the first Members of the newly created Commission of Fisheries as an Auditor of the Navy by Decree of 5 April 1895.

He was elected a Deputy to the Chamber of Deputies in the Legislature of 1900, in which he was part of a Commission on 8 January and 20 April and had interventions on 26 March, and in the Legislature of 1908-1910, in which he had interventions on 25 May and 8 July 1908 and 6 August 1909.

He was an Assistant of the Procurator of the Crown and Treasury, then renamed Procurator General of the Republic, exonerated from his office after the 5 October 1910 revolution on 24 October 1910, remaining attached to the judicial magistrature as a 1st Class Judge.

He then became a Judge of Law, etc.

== Family ==
He married on 29 August 1880/1881 Maria Ludovina de Sousa Horta (7 July 1852 - 1 January 1935), only daughter of Miguel António de Sousa Horta Almeida e Vasconcelos, 2nd Baron of Santa Comba Dão, and first wife and first cousin Maria Ludovina Vieira da Silva de Sousa Almeida e Vasconcelos, and had three children:

- António de Sousa Horta Sarmento Osório (Lousã, 14 August 1882 - Lisbon, 7 May 1960)
- José de Sousa Horta Sarmento Osório (Lisbon, 1 January 1884 - Lisbon, 11 November 1971), Bachelor graduated in Law from the University of Coimbra, Magistrate, married in Lisbon in 1928 Margarida Schroeter de Oliveira Pires (Lisbon, 4 November 1903 - Lisbon, 1975), daughter of Pedro de Oliveira Pires and Alice Schroeter, of German descent, and had one son:
  - José António Schoeter de Oliveira Pires Horta Osório (born Lisbon, Encarnação, 12 June 1930), Licentiate in Economical and Financial Sciences from the Instituto Superior de Ciências Económicas e Financeiras of the University of Lisbon, married at the Chapel of the Palace and House of the de Sousa da Câmara, São Bartolomeu, Vila Viçosa, on 8 January 1953 Maria Luísa Camacho Rodrigues de Sousa da Câmara (born Lisbon, Ajuda, 25 May 1934), daughter of Engineer and Cathedratic Professor of Engineering António Pereira de Sousa da Câmara and Francisca de Campos Camacho Rodrigues, and had issue
- Maria Luísa de Sousa Horta Sarmento Osório (31 July 1886 - 25 July 1926), unmarried and without issue

== Sources ==
- Various, Resenha das Famílias Titulares do Reino de Portugal, Lisboa, 1838, pp. 206–207
- Albano da Silveira Pinto and Dom Augusto Romano Sanches de Baena Farinha de Almeida Portugal Silva e Sousa, 1st Viscount of Sanches de Baena, Resenha das Famílias Titulares e Grandes de Portugal, Fernando Santos e Rodrigo Faria de Castro, 2.ª Edição, Braga, 1991, p. 517
- Domingos de Araújo Affonso and Rui Dique Travassos Valdez, Livro de Oiro da Nobreza, J. A. Telles da Sylva, 2.ª edição, Lisboa, 1988, Volume III, pp. 235 and 240
- José Carlos de Ataíde de Tavares, Amarais Osórios - Senhores da Casa de Almeidinha, Edição do Author, 1.ª Edição, Lisboa, 1986, p. 346, 361 and 364
- Various, Anuário da Nobreza de Portugal, III, 1985, Tomo II, p. 1,054 and Tomo III, pp. 1,072-1,573
- António Osório Sarmento de Figueiredo Jr. in a Portuguese Genealogical site
