= O Pobre Rabequista =

Painting by José Rodrigues

The Poor Rabeca Player
- O Pobre Rabequista
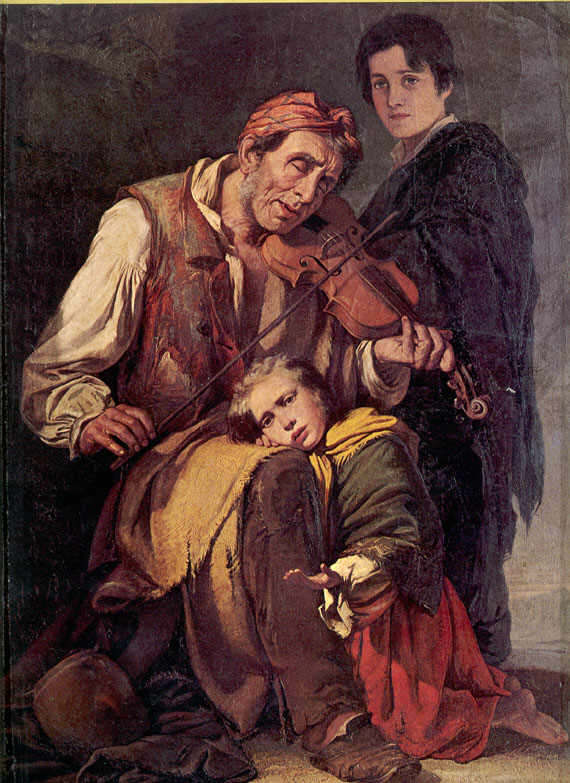
- Artist: José Rodrigues
- Year: 1855
- Medium: oil on canvas
- Dimensions: 170 cm × 122 cm (67 in × 48 in)
- Location: National Museum of Contemporary Art of Chiado, Lisbon

O Pobre Rabequista (The Poor Rabeca Player) is an oil on canvas painting by Portuguese artist José Rodrigues, from 1855.

== Exhibitions ==
- 1855 - Universal Exhibition in Paris
- 1865 - International Exposition of Porto, where he was awarded with the second medal.

It was originally purchased by Prince Consorte D. Fernando de Saxe-Coburg (Ferdinand II) and currently is in the collection of the Chiado Museum.

- In one of the editions of the Official "Litteratura Illustrada" published in Coimbra in 1860, Manuel Maria Bordalo Pinheiro, father of Rafael Bordalo Pinheiro wrote the following on this table:

The framework of "Blind Rabequista" is a genuine artistic labors, decent put up along with some pictures of Velasquez....

- The table is signed and dated and is ranked in the Chiado Museum with paragraph 515
- In the "Journal of Beaux-Arts", paragraph 3 Lisbon 1857, Rodrigo Paganino wrote several pages about the "philosophy" of this work.
