= António Maria de Sousa Horta e Costa =

Portuguese politician, noble and judge

António Maria de Sousa Horta e Costa (21 September 1859 – 5 September 1931) was a Portuguese jurist, magistrate, and politician.

He was the third son of Miguel António de Sousa Horta Almeida e Vasconcelos, 2nd Baron of Santa Comba Dão and second wife Maria da Glória da Costa Brandão e Albuquerque.

== Career ==
He was a graduate in law from the University of Coimbra, Judge of Law in Portuguese Guinea, having served in the interim the offices of governor-general and secretary general of the Province of Mozambique and, as an effective, the one of Delegate of the Procurator of the Crown and Treasury of Inhambane and Mozambique, and the one of Administrator of the Council of Soure, later becoming Judge Counselor of the Supreme Court of Justice.

== Family ==
He married firstly on 15 February 1885 Guilhermina de Carvalho da Costa Soares (3 November 1868 – 15 July 1888), daughter of Dr Pedro da Costa Soares, Bachelor graduated in law from the University of Coimbra, Captain-Major of the firm land of Mozambique, and Guilhermina Cândida da Costa Ferreira, without issue.

He married secondly on 22 November 1890 Dona Maria Luísa José de Jesus da Câmara (Lisbon, 24 November 1870 – ?), daughter of Dom Luís Maria da Câmara, of the marquesses (formerly counts of a Ribeira Grande (formerly Marquesses of Ponta Delgada and Counts of Vila Franca) and Counts of Atouguia, and Francisca Gertrudes Vilar Ferreira, and had three children:

- António Miguel da Câmara de Sousa Horta e Costa (12 October 1891 – 22 November 1948), Bachelor graduated in law from University of Coimbra, etc., married firstly Maria Teresa Emauz Leite Ribeiro (15 February 1888 – 16 November 1918), daughter of Joaquim Leite Ribeiro and Maria Carlota Quintela Emauz, of distant Dutch descent, without issue, and married secondly on 16 October 1933 Maria Teresa Perry Vidal Marques da Costa (11 September 1896 – ?), daughter of Dr. Levy Marques da Costa, Bachelor graduated in law, lawyer, and Ema Perry Vidal, of distant English descent, without issue
- Álvaro Luís da Câmara de Sousa Horta e Costa (22 October 1892 – ?), married on 25 April 1918 Mary Oackley (19 February 1891 – 30 May 1925), daughter of English Hugh Charles George Oackley, Consul of the United Kingdom in Lisbon, and Maria Amélia de Aguiar, and had two sons:
  - António Hugo Oackley de Sousa Horta e Costa (born 19 August 1919), married on 19 August 1942 Noémia de Castro dos Anjos, daughter of Eurico dos Anjos and Albina de Castro, and had one daughter:
    - Maria Madalena dos Anjos Horta e Costa (born 27 June 1943), without further notice
  - Carlos Maria Oackley de Sousa Horta e Costa (born 8 May 1925), without further notice
- Maria Luísa da Câmara de Sousa Horta e Costa (6 April 1902 – ?), married on 12 March 1921 Civil Engineer Vasco Jácome Correia Martins (28 December 1892 – ?), son of Vasco Correia Martins, Army General, etc., and Leopoldina Alves Pereira de Alvarenga, and had issue

== Sources ==
- Albano da Silveira Pinto and Dom Augusto Romano Sanches de Baena Farinha de Almeida Portugal Silva e Sousa, 1st Viscount of Sanches de Baena, Resenha das Famílias Titulares e Grandes de Portugal, Fernando Santos e Rodrigo Faria de Castro, 2.ª edição, Braga, 1991, p. 517
- Domingos de Araújo Affonso and Rui Dique Travassos Valdez, Livro de Oiro da Nobreza, J. A. Telles da Sylva, 2.ª edição, Lisboa, 1988, Volume III, pp. 237–238 and 890
- António de Vasconcelos, Brás Garcia Mascarenhas, Imprensa da Universidade, Coimbra, 1921, p. 157
- Various, Anuário da Nobreza de Portugal, III, 1985, Tomo I, p. 854 and Tomo II, pp. 1,049–1,050
- António Maria de Sousa Horta e Costa in a Portuguese Genealogical site
