= Balsemão =

Balsemão could refer to:

- Balsemão River, a river in Viseu District, Portugal
- Francisco Pinto Balsemão (1937–2025), Portuguese businessman and politician
- Viscount of Balsemão, a noble title
- Baron of Balsemão, a noble title
