= 1827 in Portugal =

- Centuries: 17th; 18th; 19th; 20th; 21st
- Decades: 1800s; 1810s; 1820s; 1830s; 1840s
- See also: List of years in Portugal

Events in the year 1827 in Portugal.

== Incumbents ==
- Monarch: Mary II

== Events ==
- Centro de Apoio Social de Runa opened

== Births ==
- 13 August – Francisco Gomes de Amorim, poet, dramatist, and novelist (died 1891).

== Deaths ==
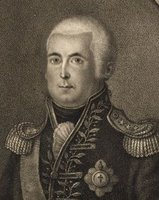
Miguel Pereira Forjaz, Count of Feira

- 18 January – José António Camões, Catholic priest, poet and historian (b. 1777)
- 6 November – Miguel Pereira Forjaz, Count of Feira, general (b. 1769)
