= 1823 in Portugal =

- Centuries: 17th; 18th; 19th; 20th; 21st
- Decades: 1800s; 1810s; 1820s; 1830s; 1840s
- See also: List of years in Portugal

Events in the year 1823 in Portugal.

== Incumbents ==
- Monarch: John VI

== Births ==
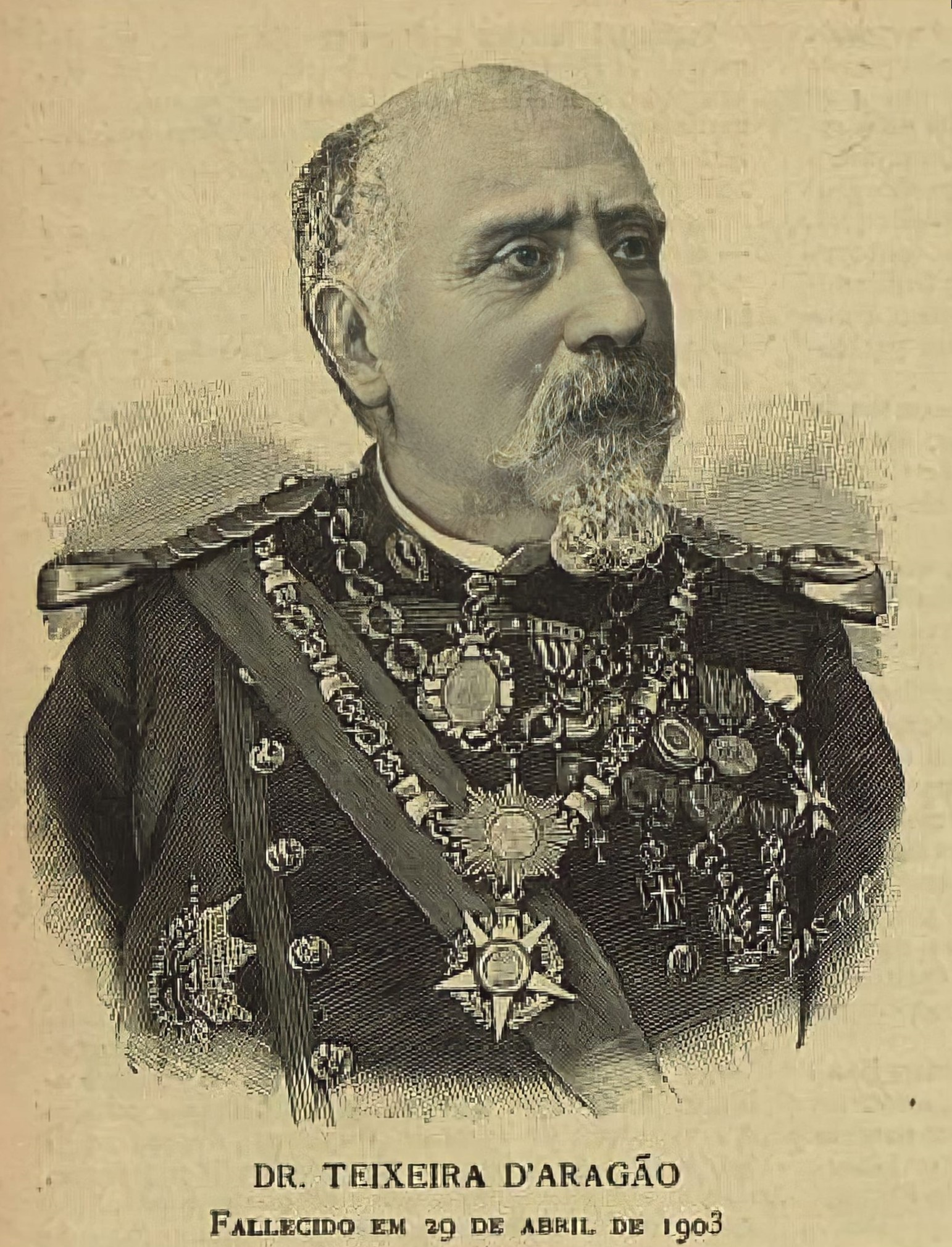
Augusto Carlos Teixeira de Aragão

- 2 May – José Vicente Barbosa du Bocage, zoologist and politician (d. 1907).
- 15 June – Augusto Carlos Teixeira de Aragão, Army officer, doctor, numismatist, archaeologist and historian (d. 1903).
- 3 August – Henrique O'Neill, 1st Viscount of Santa Mónica, writer, jurist and politician (d. 1889).

== Deaths ==
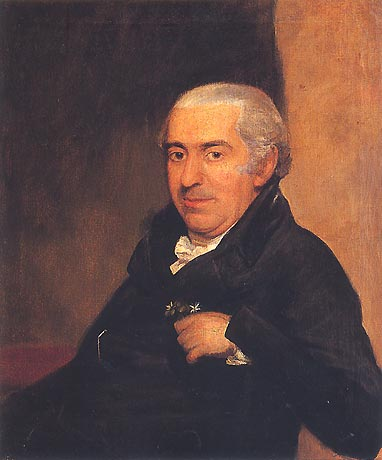
José Correia da Serra

- 11 September – José Correia da Serra, Abbot, polymath, philosopher, diplomat, politician and scientist (b. 1750 or 1751).
