= Monte Molião =

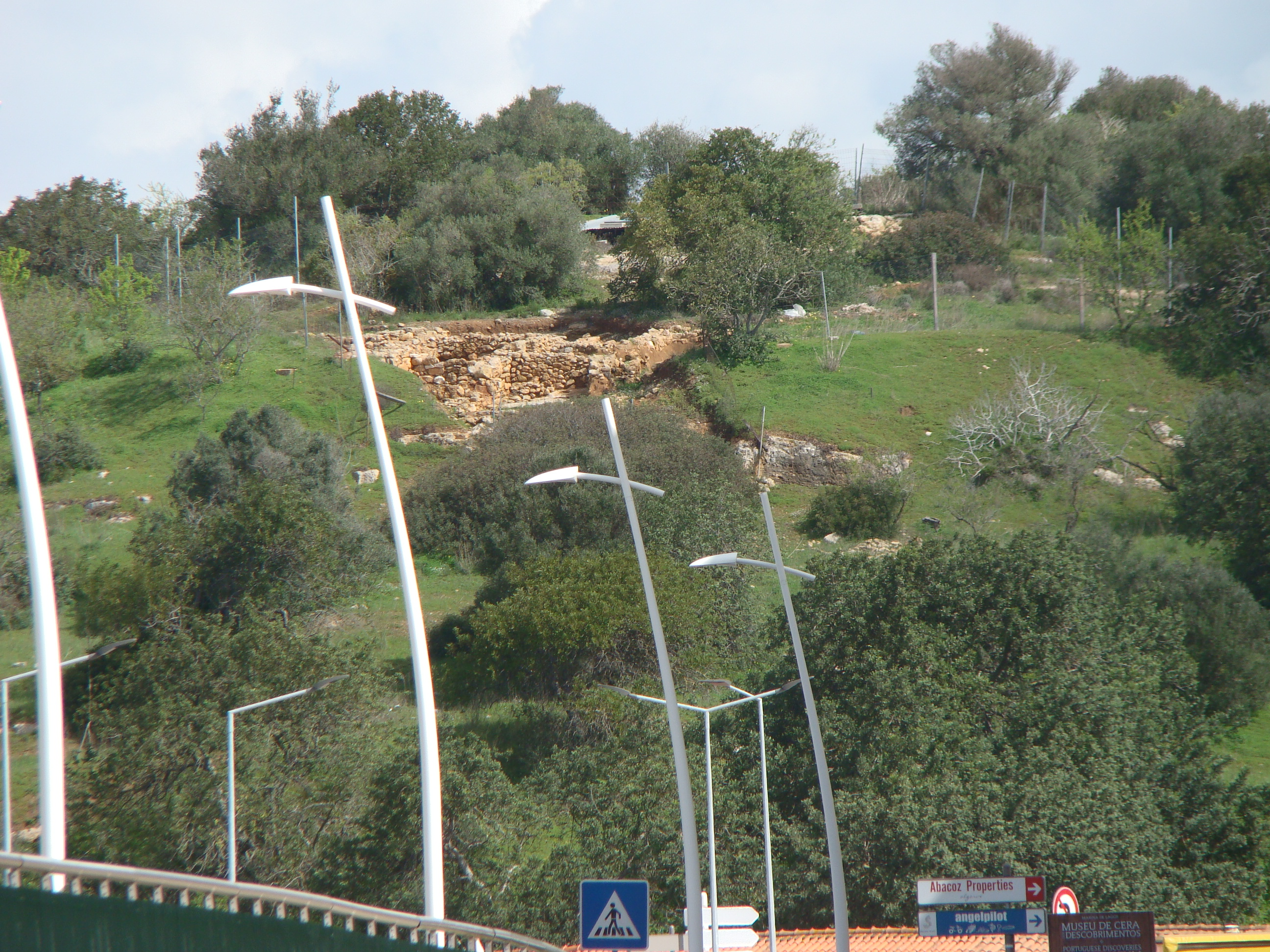
View of Monte Molião and part of the Archaeological Site

Monte Molião is an archaeological site located in the Municipality of Lagos, in Portugal . The site is located on Monte Molião, an elevation north-west of Lagos city center, on the east bank of the Ribeira de Bensafrim, in the parish of São Sebastião. It is the vestiges of an old fortified settlement, also identified as Lacóbriga, occupied since the Second Iron Age, between the end of the 4th century BC and the end of the 3rd century BC. This location is of Celtic origin and was progressively abandoned during the Carthaginian and Roman, the Republican Roman, and the Imperial Roman ages due to the growth of another population center, with the same name.

== Excavation history ==
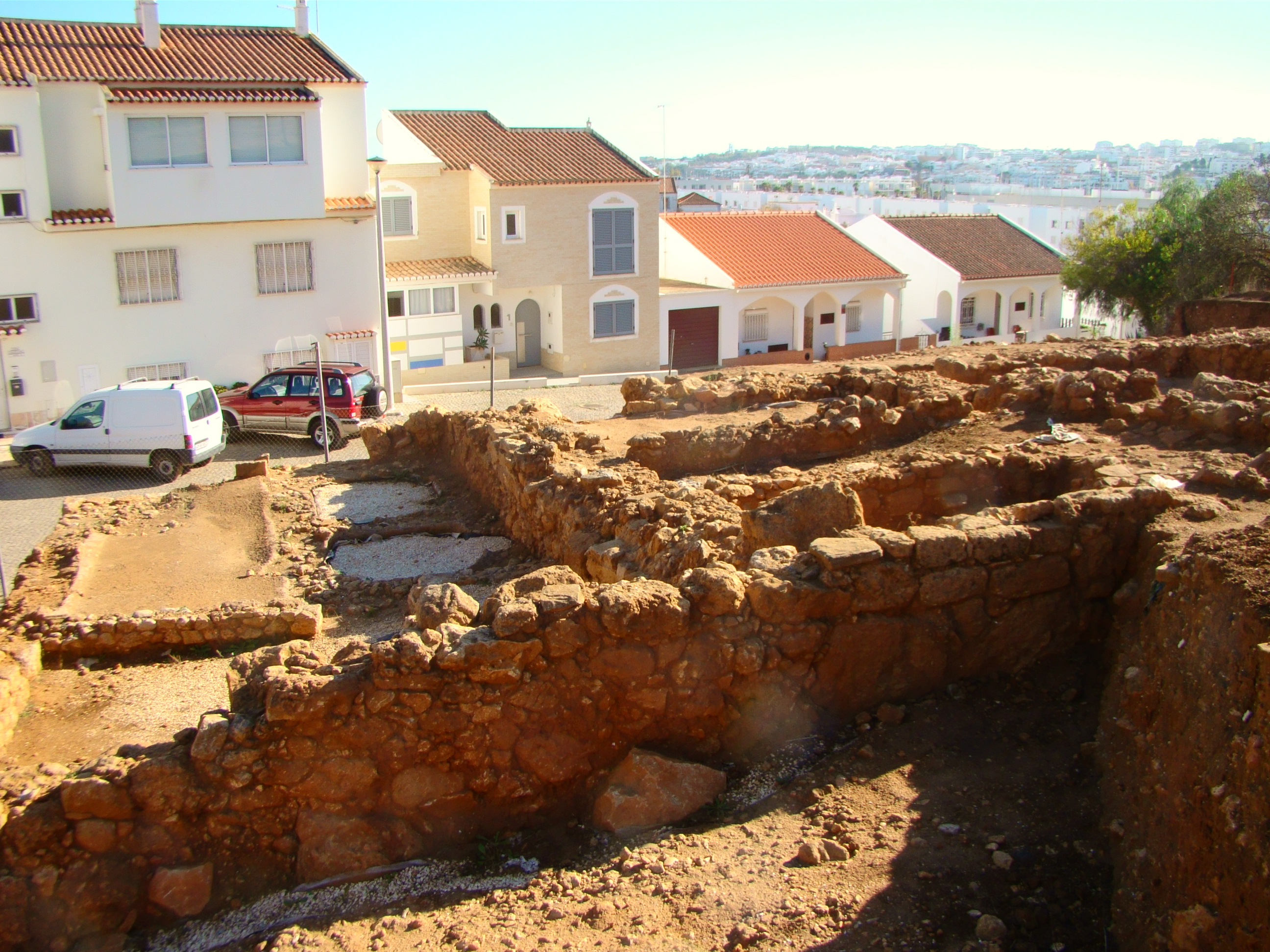
Entrance of the archaeological site.

At the end of the 19th century, Portuguese archaeologist, Estácio da Veiga, identified the remnants as being of a fortified town. He observed the presence of several constructions: an elliptical cistern, "a great wall that ended at an acute angle as if it were a fortified point," and other smaller structures, enough to indicate a "destroyed fortified settlement". He collected two gold earrings (4th Century), republican coinage, a bronze of Mercury from the Roman Period (2nd century AD) now in the National Archaeology Museum, Roman amphorae and ceramics and other materials of the Iron Age, Roman age and medieval age. In the early 20th century Father José Joaquim Nunes discovered a Roman necropolis of imperial times the location of which is unknown today. In 1992, a section of Monte Molião was destroyed by an extension of National Road 125. In 2005, drilling and geophysical surveys were carried out.

== Protection ==
The monument is classified as a Property of Public Interest, according to Decree No. 26 A / 92, of June 1.

== Gallery ==
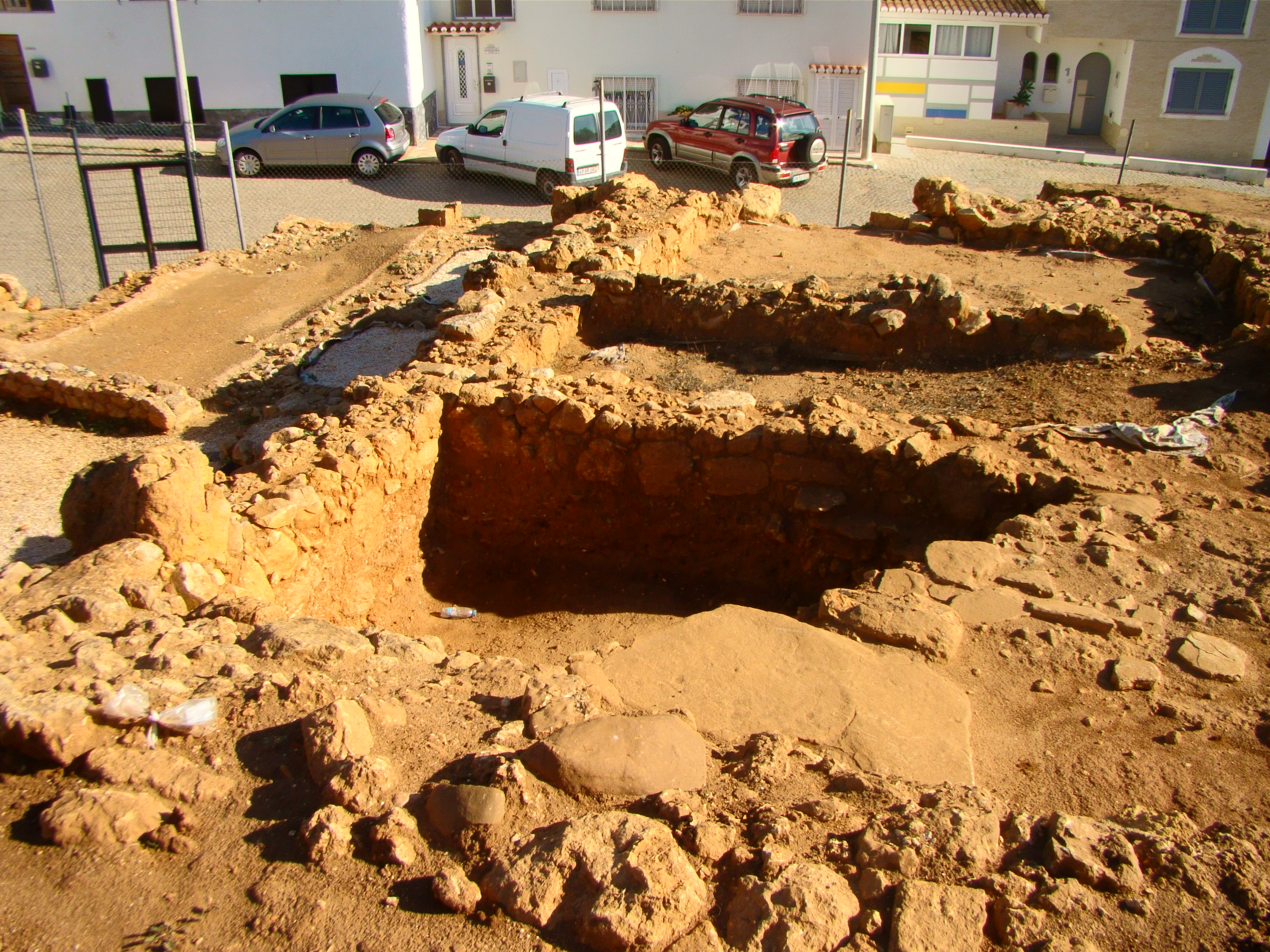
Partial view of Monte Molião.

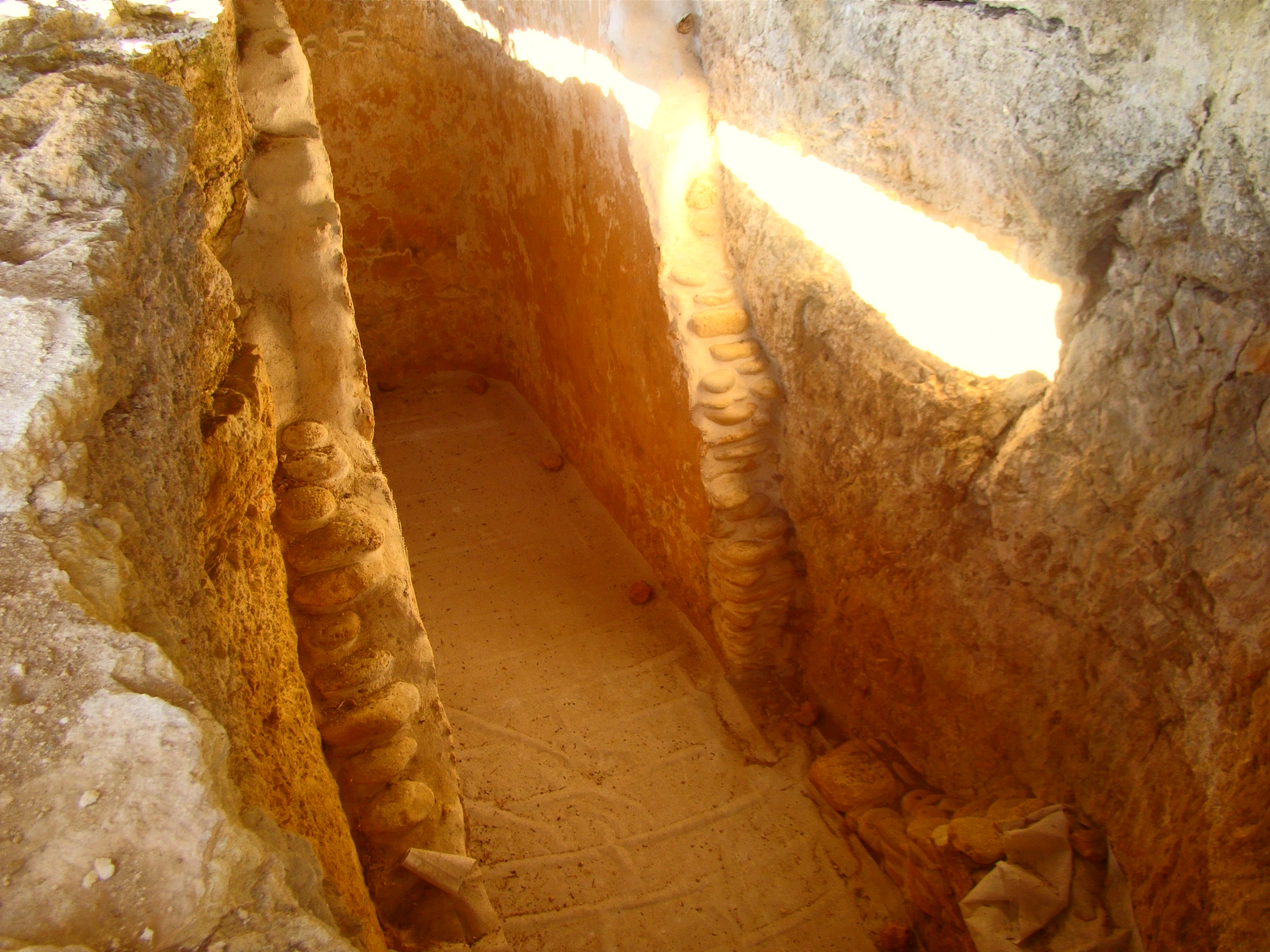
Interior of a cistern.

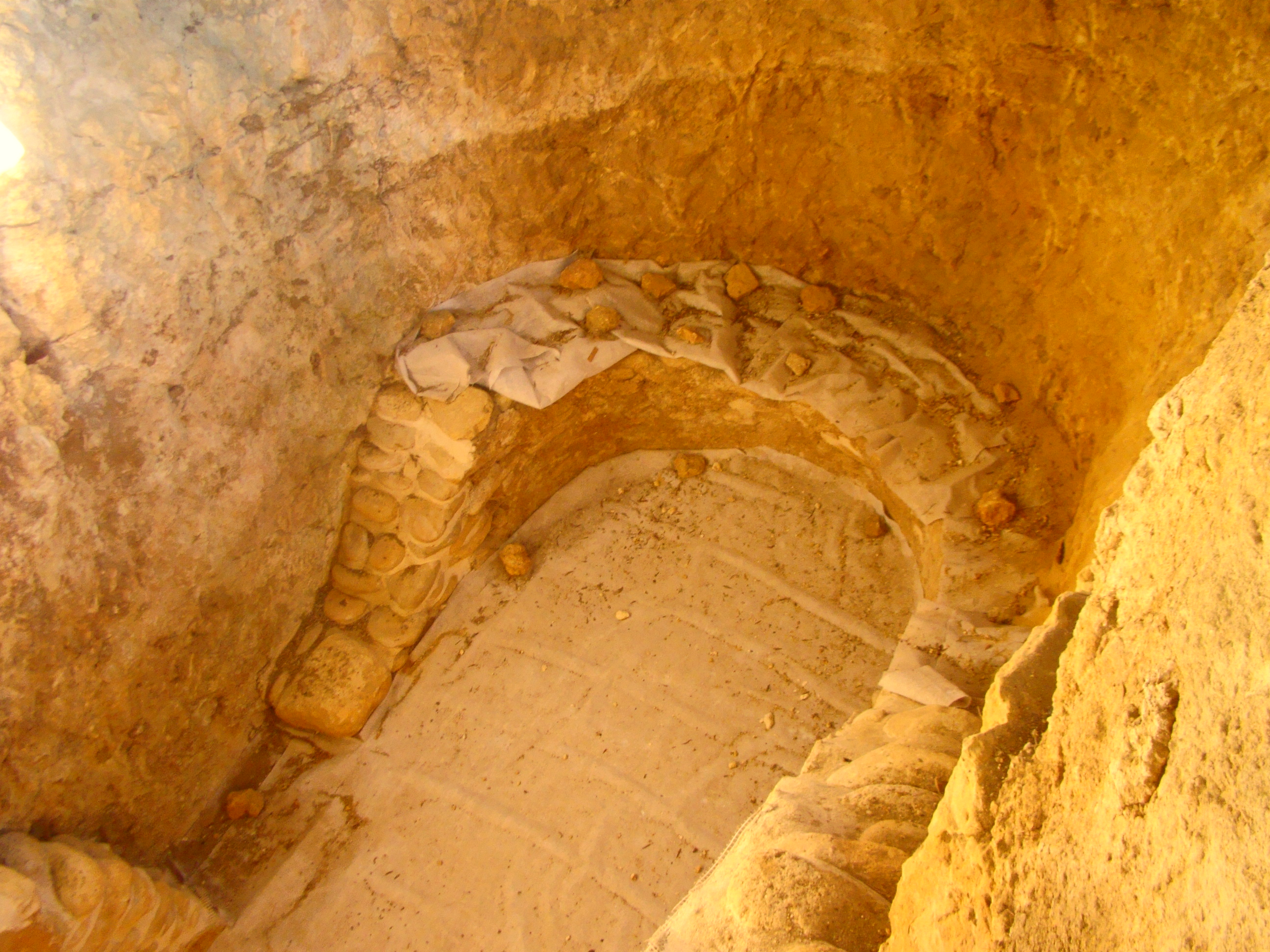
The cistern seen from a different angle.

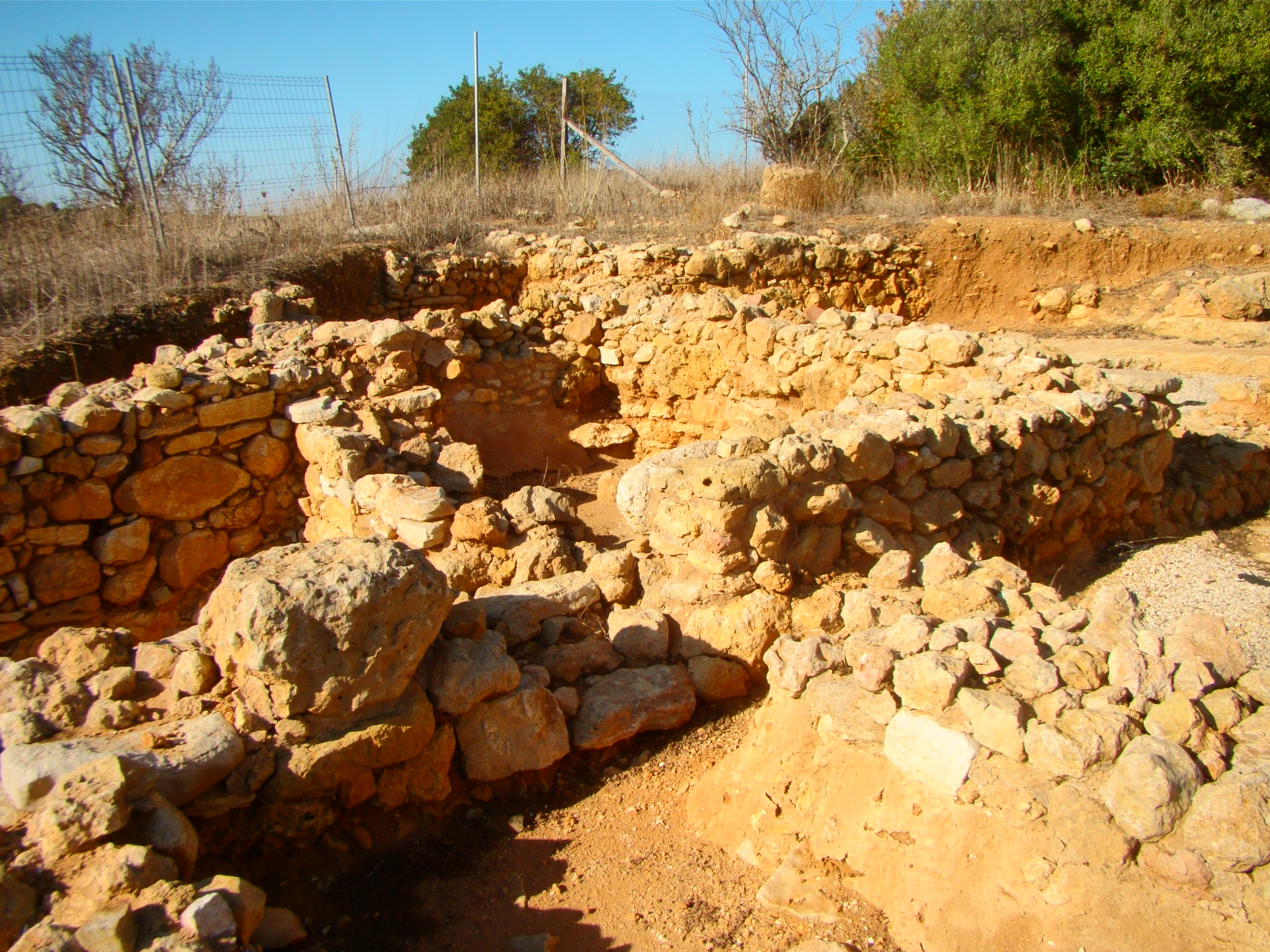
House divisions.

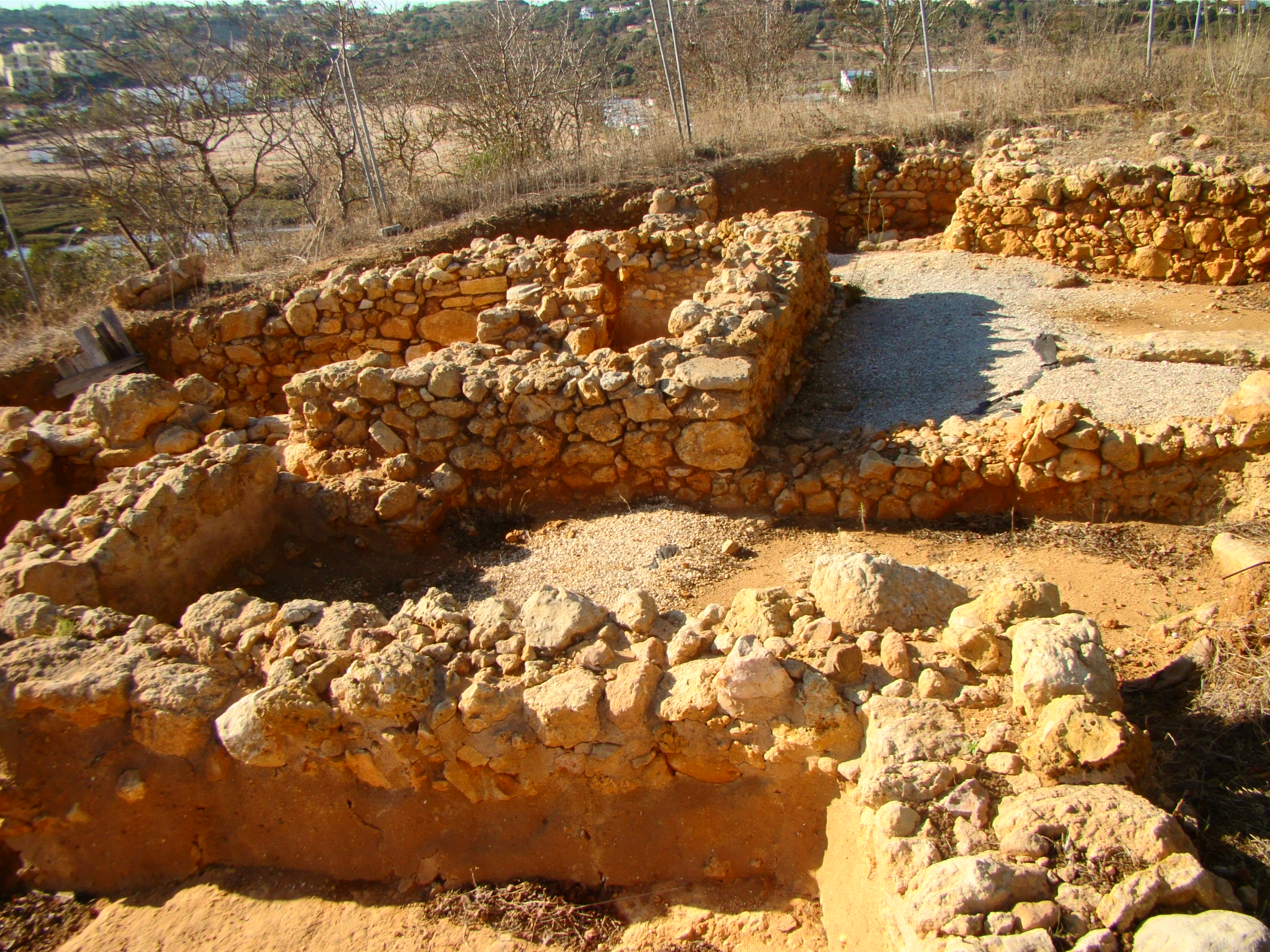
The remains of what appears to be a defensive wall.
