= 1824 in Portugal =

- Decades: 1800s; 1810s; 1820s; 1830s; 1840s
- See also: History of Portugal; Timeline of Portuguese history; List of years in Portugal

Events in the year 1824 in Portugal.

== Incumbents ==
- Monarch: John VI

== Events ==
- 30 April – April Revolt

== Births ==
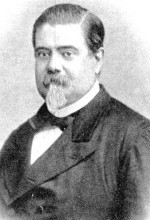
António Maria Barreiros Arrobas

- 18 July – António Maria Barreiros Arrobas, colonial administrator (d. 1888).

== Deaths ==
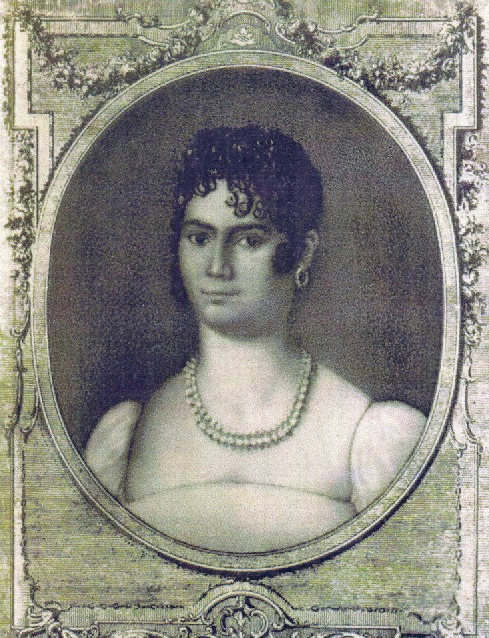
Catarina de Lencastre, Viscountess of Balsemão

- January – Catarina de Lencastre, Viscountess of Balsemão, noblewoman, poet and playwright (b. 1749).
