= 1821 in Portugal =

- Centuries: 17th; 18th; 19th; 20th; 21st
- Decades: 1800s; 1810s; 1820s; 1830s; 1840s
- See also: List of years in Portugal

Events in the year 1821 in Portugal.

== Incumbents ==
- Monarch: John VI
  - President of the Regency: Manuel António de Sampaio Melo e Castro Moniz Torres de Lusignan (from January)
- Minister of the Kingdom: Inácio da Costa Quintela (from 4 July to 7 September), Francisco Duarte Coelho (interim, from 14 August to 7 September), Filipe Ferreira de Araújo e Castro (from 7 September), José da Silva Carvalho (interim, from 7 September to 8 October)

== Events ==
- January - General Extraordinary and Constituent Courts of the Portuguese Nation
- Cortes Gerais e Extraordinárias da Nação Portuguesa drafts the basis for a new constitution, proposes the closure of Portuguese Inquisition
- July 4 - Return of John VI from Brazil, who approves on that day the Bases da Constituição
