= José de Seabra da Silva =

His Excellency José de Seabra da Silva GCC
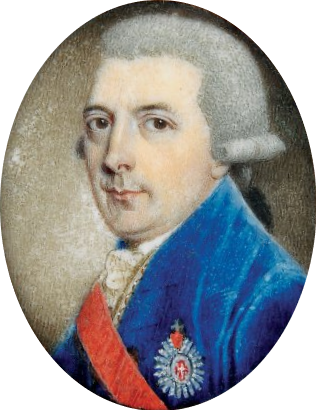

Secretary of State for the Internal Affairs of the Kingdom
- In office 15 December 1788 – 6 January 1801
- Monarch: Maria I of Portugal
- Preceded by: The Viscount of Vila Nova de Cerveira
- Succeeded by: The Viscount of Balsemão

Adjunct Secretary of State for the Internal Affairs of the Kingdom
- In office 3 June 1771 – 17 January 1774
- Monarch: Maria I of Portugal
- Prime Minister: The Marquis of Pombal
- Succeeded by: Aires de Sá e Melo

Chief Guardian of the Royal Archives
- In office 1768–1774
- Monarch: Joseph I of Portugal
- Preceded by: Manuel da Maia
- Succeeded by: José Pereira Ramos de Azeredo Coutinho
- In office 1799–1802
- Preceded by: José Pereira Ramos de Azeredo Coutinho
- Succeeded by: The Viscount of Balsemão

Personal details
- Born: 31 October 1732 Torre de Vilela, Portugal
- Died: 12 March 1813 (aged 80) São Sebastião da Pedreira, Lisbon, Portugal
- Spouse: Ana Felícia Coutinho Pereira de Sousa Tavares Cerveira e Horta
- Occupation: Politician

José de Seabra da Silva GCC (31 October 1732 – 12 March 1813), was a Portuguese magistrate and politician. He was Secretary of State during the rule of the Marquis of Pombal. He contributed to an anti-Jesuit treatise that was used to justify the expulsion of Jesuits from Portugal.

== Early life ==
José de Seabra da Silva was the first-born child of Lucas de Seabra da Silva and Josefa Teresa de Morais Ferraz. His father, Lucas de Seabra da Silva, was a professor of law at the University of Coimbra, later a Councilor of the Exchequer (Conselheiro da Fazenda) and a judge in the Royal Supreme Court (Desembargo do Paço). Josefa Teresa de Morais Ferraz was an administrator of the Majorat of Figueiró dos Vinhos.

== Education and career ==
First tutored by a clergyman, José enrolled at the University of Coimbra in 1744 at the age of 12, and completed his studies in 1751. On 1 March 1752, he sat in on a public examination (de jure aperto) so he could join the judiciary. Sebastião José de Carvalho e Melo, the Secretary of State for Foreign Affairs and War at the time, was in attendance and surprised by the young man's erudition. In 1753, José was made a desembargador in the court of appeals of Porto, and was in 1754 transferred to the Court of Supplication (Casa da Suplicação, the royal higher court of appeals), in Lisbon.

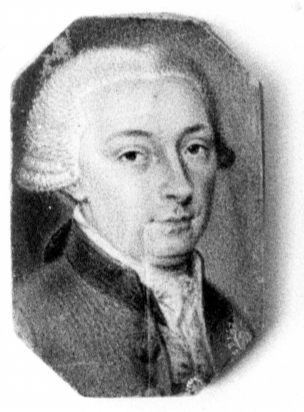
Portrait miniature of young José de Seabra da Silva

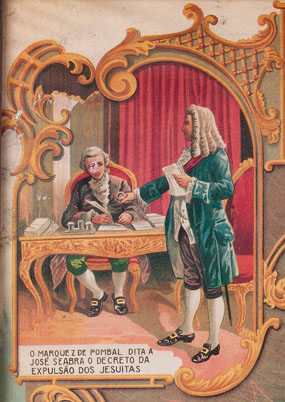
A depiction of the Marquis of Pombal dictating to José de Seabra da Silva the decree of expulsion of the Jesuits, in 1759

After the 1755 Lisbon earthquake, when Sebastião José de Carvalho e Melo started to consolidate his power over the government, he was invited to act as the minister's particular clerk and protégé. Seabra da Silva then saw a rapid succession of promotions in the public administration: in 1757, he was made a supervisor of the General Company of Grão-Pará and Maranhão; in 1765, he was made the executor of Queen Mariana Victoria's finances; in April 1765, he was made a Crown Prosecutor, in which position he was a powerful aide of Carvalho e Melho in his campaign against the influence of both the Jesuits and the Jacobins; in November 1765, he was made Chancellor of the Court of Supplication; in April 1766, he was made Chief Guardian of the Royal Archives; in January 1770, he was made a judge in the Royal Supreme Court; and, finally, in June 1771, he was made Adjunct Secretary of State under Carvalho e Melo (now titled Marquis of Pombal).

== Fall from favour ==
José de Seabra da Silva fell suddenly and unexpectedly out of favour. On the morning of 17 January 1774, as the Royal Family was departing to Salvaterra de Magos, Seabra da Silva was sent to the Marquis of Pombal to receive further orders: the Marquis handed him a decree, signed by the King, stripping him of his offices and banishing him to Besteiros, Tondela as soon as possible. On 30 April, two magistrates and a cavalry force arrested him in his house in Tondela, and he was imprisoned in the Fort of Saint John the Baptist of Foz, in Porto. On October, he was sent to exile in Brazil (Ilha das Cobras, in Rio de Janeiro), and then to Angola (Fortress of Pungo-Andongo) without trial or hearing. The reason was uncertain. Some attribute it to machinations by Cardinal João Cosme da Cunha; Jácome Ratton, who in his later published memoirs insisted that it was due to Seabra da Silva having told the Queen about a plot by Pombal and the King to exclude Princess Maria as heiress to the throne in favour of her son, Prince Joseph.

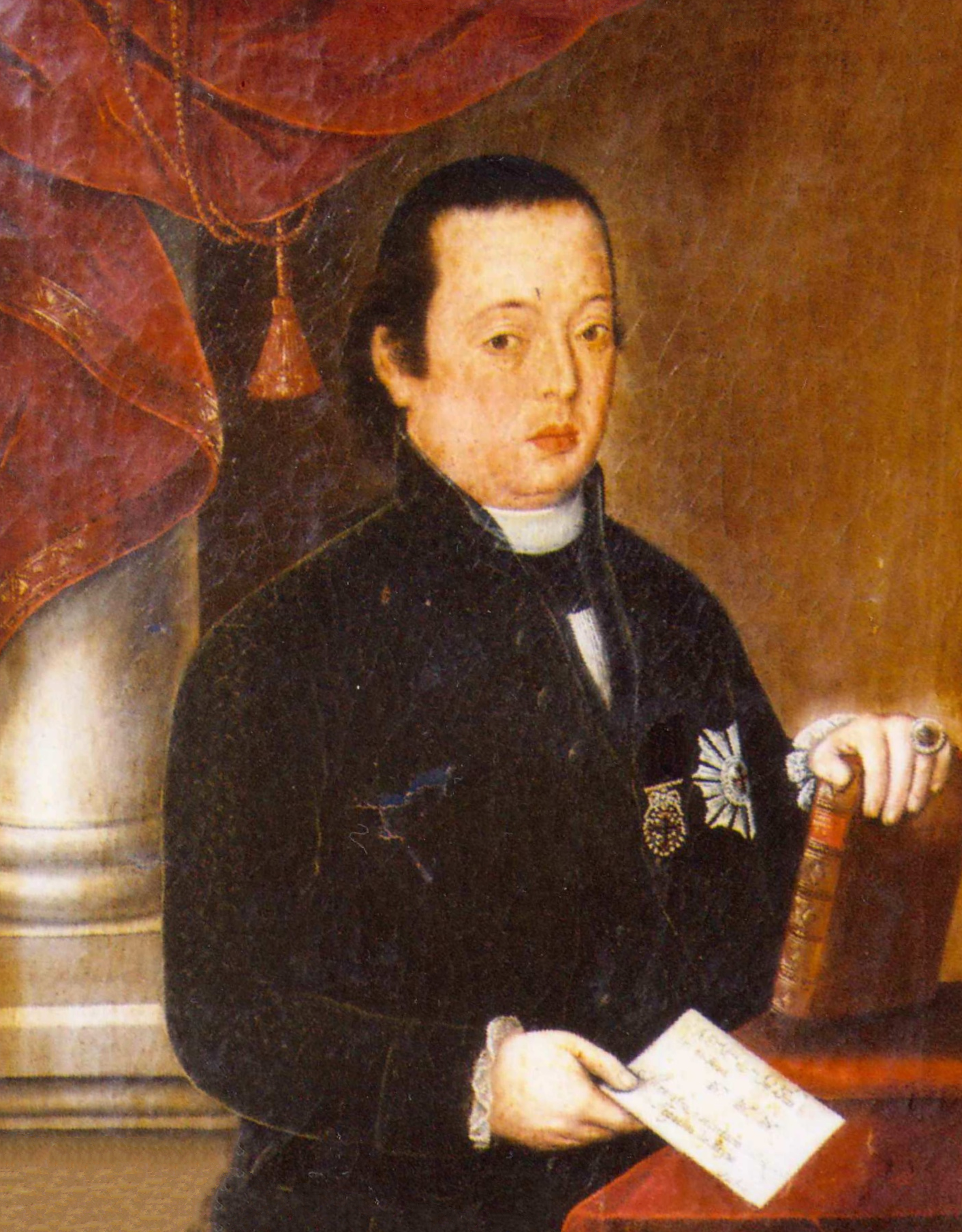
José de Seabra da Silva, as Secretary of State for the Internal Affairs of the Kingdom

In 1777, after King Joseph's death and the Acclamation of Princess Maria as Queen Maria I of Portugal, Seabra da Silva returned to Lisbon, where he was bestowed with the comenda of São Miguel de Oliveira de Azeméis in the Order of Christ. At first, he enjoyed a quiet life among his friends and family. In 1788, after the death of two important government ministers, the 3rd Marquis of Angeja and of Aires de Sá e Melo, the Queen had Seabra da Silva head a new cabinet. Seabra da Silva's government coincided with the French Revolution.

== Death ==
José de Seabra da Silva died in his home, in São Sebastião da Pedreira, Lisbon, on 12 March 1813.
