= 1749 in Portugal =

- Decades: 1720s; 1730s; 1740s; 1750s; 1760s
- See also: History of Portugal; Timeline of Portuguese history; List of years in Portugal

Events in the year 1749 in Portugal.

== Incumbents ==
- Monarch: John V

== Events ==
- Pope Pope Benedict XIV gave John V of Portugal the title "His Most Faithful Majesty"

== Births ==
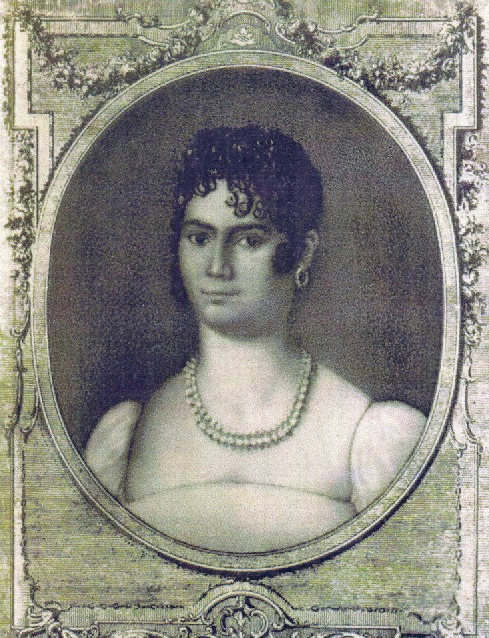
Catarina de Lencastre, Viscountess of Balsemão

- 29 September – Catarina de Lencastre, Viscountess of Balsemão, noblewoman, poet and playwright (d. 1824).

== Deaths ==
- 29 May – Jaime Álvares Pereira de Melo, 3rd Duke of Cadaval, nobleman and statesman (b. 1684).
