= Roman Dam of Fonte Coberta =

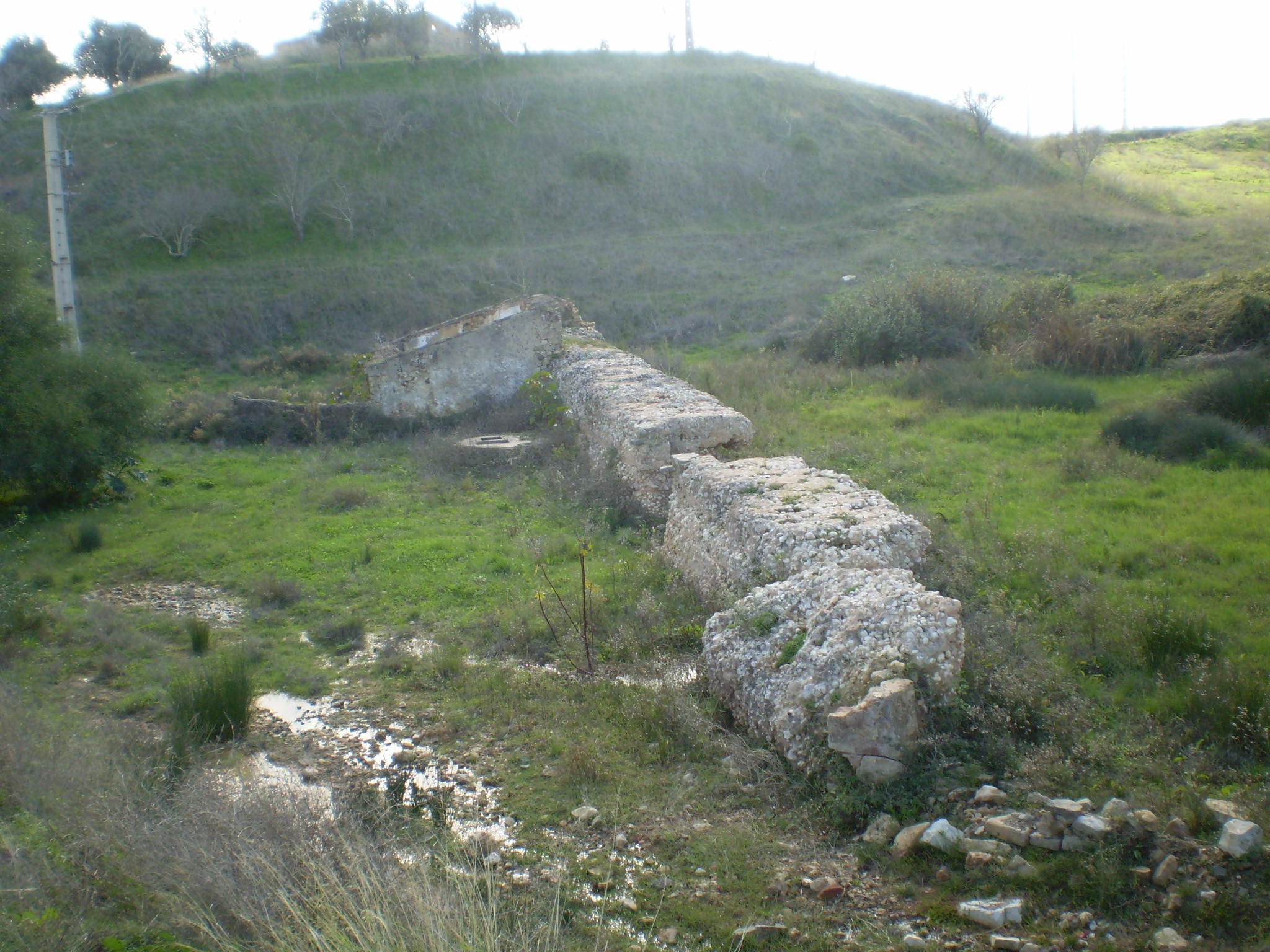
Fonte Coberta Roman dam in 2010

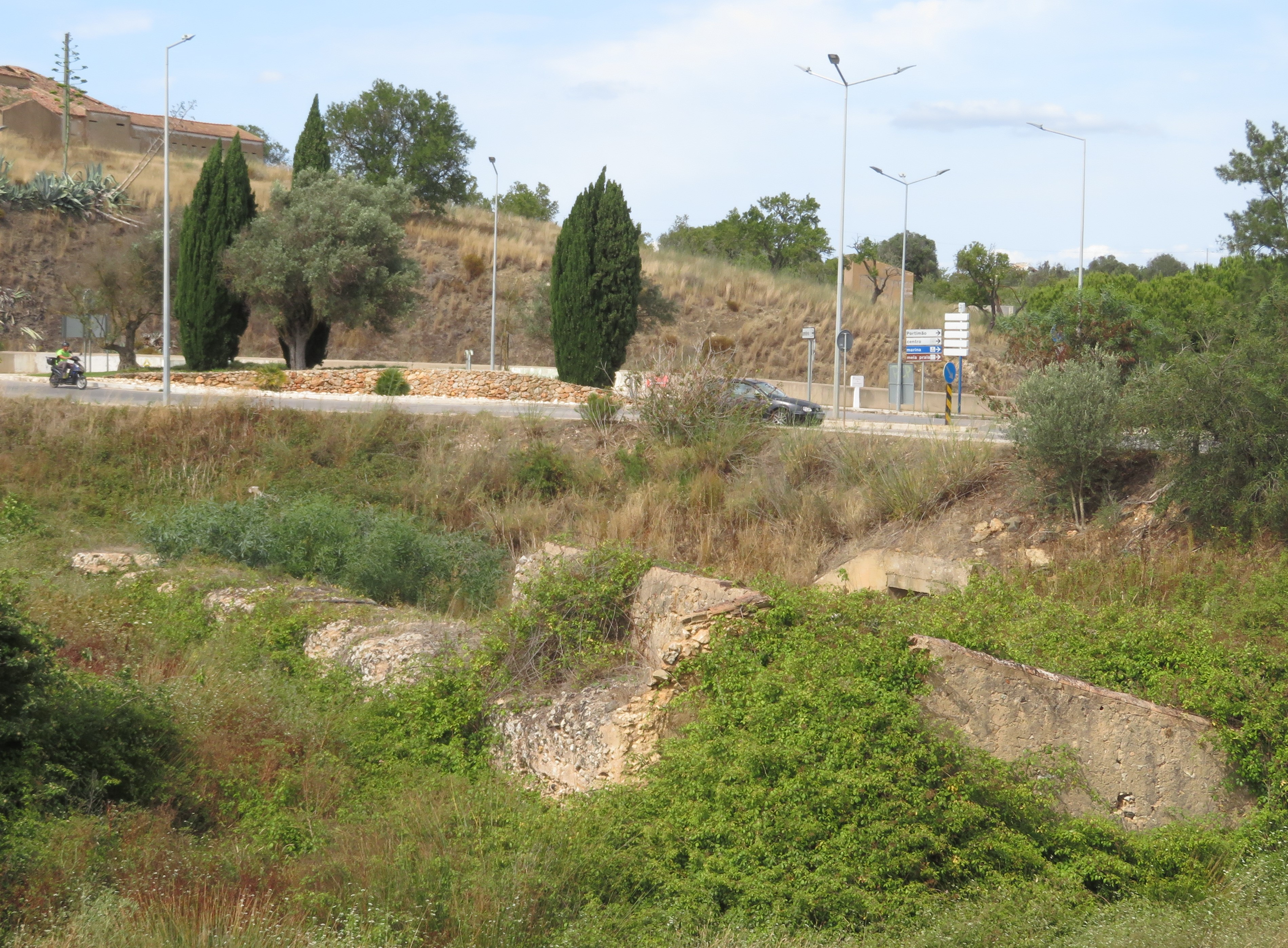
Fonte Coberta Roman dam in 2023

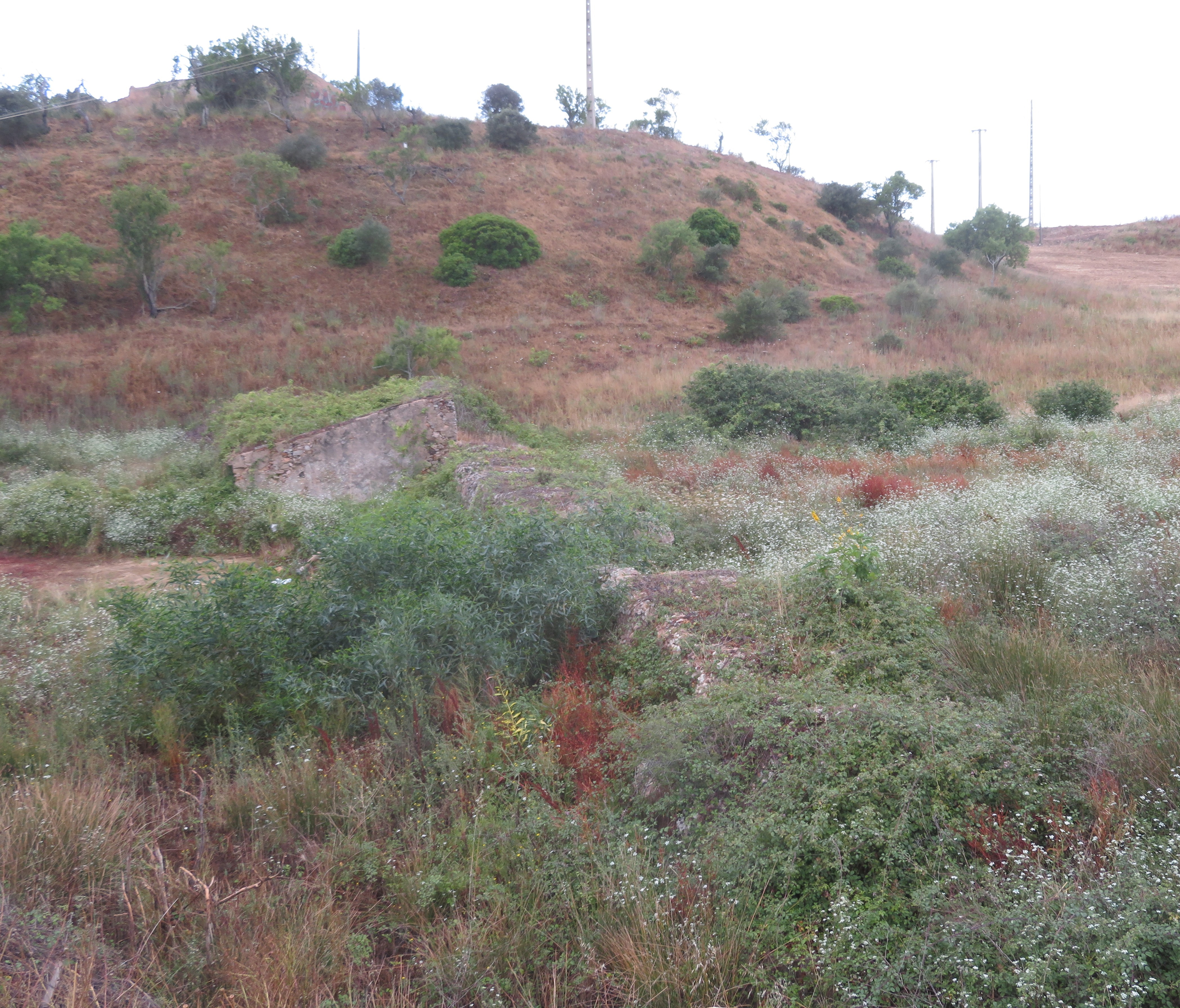
Side elevation of the dam in 2023

Roman Dam of Fonte Coberta (Barragem Romana da Fonte Coberta) is an archeologic site of a Roman dam in the parish of São Sebastião, municipality of Lagos, in the Algarve region of southern Portugal. The dam was constructed during the Romanization of Hispania.

== Structure ==
The wall is about 70 meters long, and between 2.6 and 2.7 meters thick. From the typological point of view, it is a wall of straight, rectangular section, consisting of homogeneous stone blocks mortared in opus caementicium. It is situated in an open valley, which is relatively open, develops in the direction of the river Ribeira de Bensafrim. It is built where the valley begins to narrow, about 1.3 km west of Ribeira de Bensafrim. Barragem Romana da Fonte Coberta may have served to irrigate cultivated fields, or as part of a water supply system for the town of Lacobriga, which was situated on Monte Molião, on the east bank of Ribeira of Bensafrim. In the areas that preserve the face of this structure it is possible to identify some negatives of what appear to be horizontally arranged boards, which would probably form part of the frame work system assembled for its construction.

== History ==
Its identification was initially made by Estácio da Veiga in the second half of the 19th century.

== Protection ==
It is classified by the Institute of Management of Architectural and Archaeological Heritage as Property of Public Interest, according to Decree-Law 26-A / 92, DR 126 of June 1, 1992.
