= Balsa (Roman town) =

Roman town

Coordinates: 37°05′08″N 7°41′38″W

Balsa was a Roman coastal town in the province of Lusitania, Conventus Pacensis (capital Pax Julia).

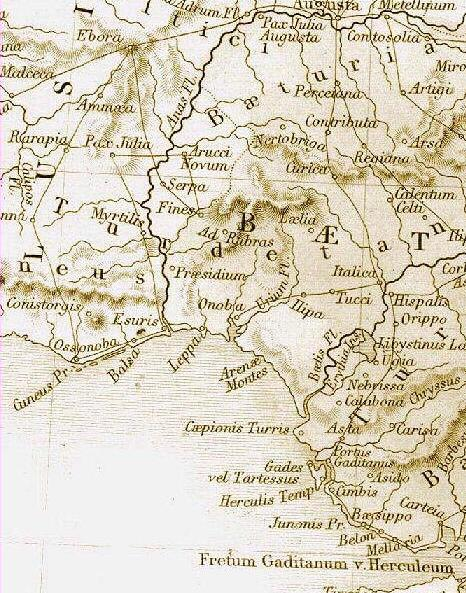
A 19th century reproduction of a Roman map depicting the Gulf of Cádiz. Balsa can be seen on it.

The modern location is in the rural estates of Torre d'Aires, Antas and Arroio, parish of Luz de Tavira, county of Tavira, district of Faro, in Algarve, Southern Portugal. Although having been one of the biggest Roman cities of Lusitania at the time, only in 2019 did excavations finally reveal remnants of Balsa.

== Name origin ==
Balsa is a pre-Roman place-name with a probable Phoenician etymology: B'LŠ..., a possible theonym connected with the older Phoenician occupation of neighbouring Tavira.

== References in Classical authors and archaeology ==
It is mentioned by Pomponius Mela (DC III 1, 7), Pliny (HN IV 35, 116), Ptolemy (GH: II 5, 2), and Marcianus of Heracleia (PME: II, 13).

Mints bronze asses and its lead divisors (semis, quadrans, triens, sextans) about mid 1st century BCE, in Latin alphabet with marine motives (tunas, dolphins, several kinds of boats). The name BALSA, recorded in these coins is the oldest attestation of the toponym.

According to Mela (DC III 1, 7) Balsa was situated in the Cuneus Ager, a Roman geographical region corresponding to modern Central and Eastern Algarve.

It was one of the stipendiary oppida of Lusitania, Siege of the Balsenses (Pliny: IV 35, 118), people belonging to the ethnical group of the Turdetani (Ptolemy: II 5, 2).

Stage of via XXI of Antonine Itineraries, between [B]Esuri and Ossonoba (IAA: 426,1) . Referred as civitas in the Ravennate between Besurin and Stacio Sacra (RAC: IV 43, 30).

It was considered by Marcianus of Heracleia the polis at the southmost limit of Lusitania (M. H.: II, 14).

Place Identification is attested by epigraphy found in the local, where Balsensium appears three times, qualifying persons CIL II, 5161 CIL II, 5164 and the political community IRCP 75.

== Pre-Roman past ==
The Late Bronze and Early Iron Age oppidum of Tavira (7 km from Roman BALSA) stands as the genetic regional urban place, first as a Phoenician maritime colonial settlement with a strong religious character (mid 8th to end of 6th centuries BCE) and later as a Turdetani town (5th and 4 th centuries BCE).

It was abandoned and replaced by the near oppidum of Cerro do Cavaco (1 km North of Tavira, occupied from the late 4th to late 1st centuries BCE), a better defensible site that was the central place of the Balsenses during the Carthaginian and Roman Republican periods.

Cerro do Cavaco, the pre-Roman BALSA, did not survive the epoch of Augustus, being then replaced by Roman BALSA.

== Status, society and economy ==
Epigraphic inscriptions reveal BALSA as a Latin Right Municipality (ius Latii Municipium) during the 2nd century CE, most probably promoted by Domitian (81-96 CE).

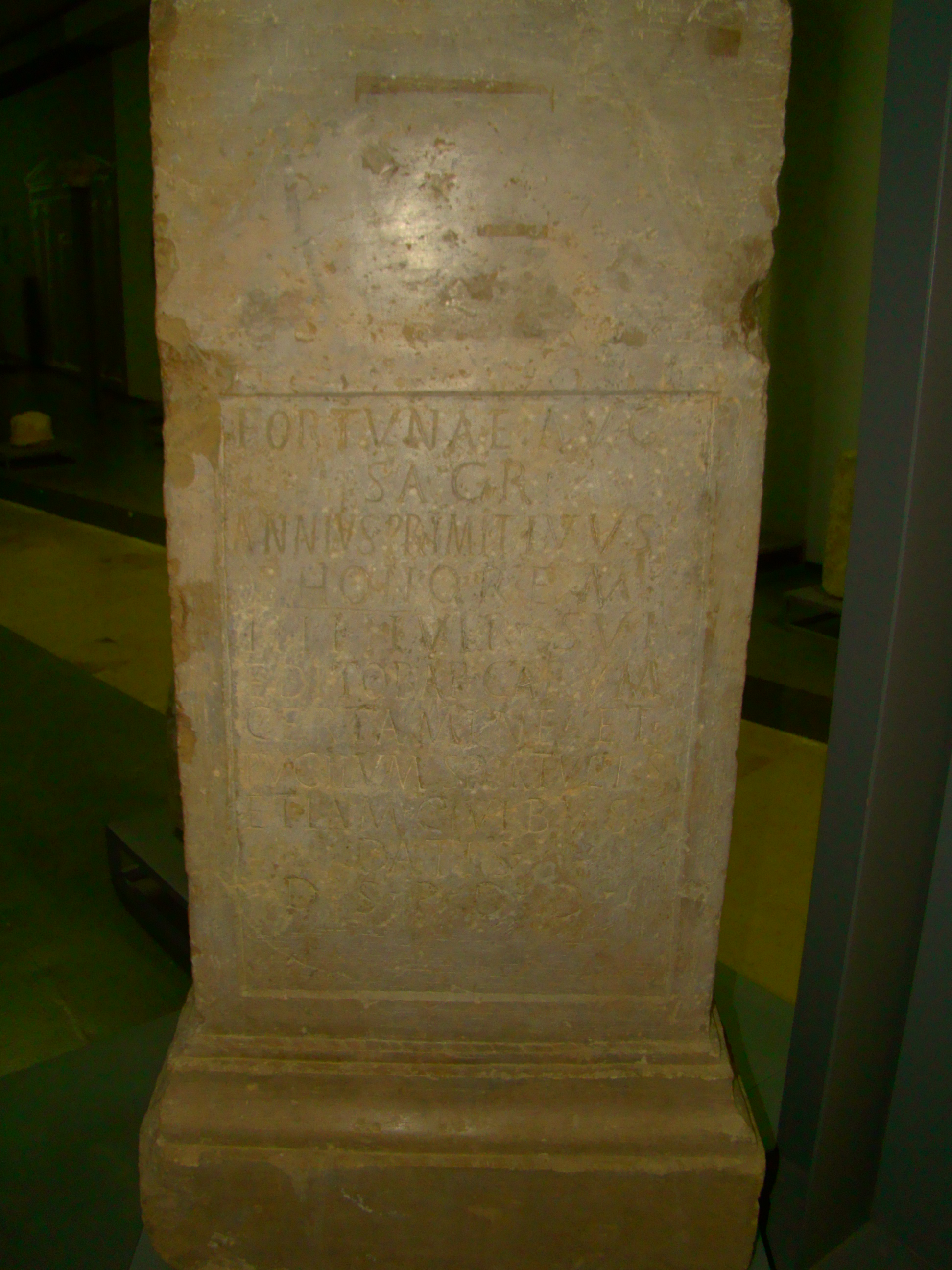
A Roman Cippus found in Balsa with an inscription honoring an Annius Primitivus for having financed a naval and athlete fight. Now at display at Faro's Museum.

All main aspects of provincial Romanisation are documented locally: A res publica with a ordo decurionica IRCP 75, local prominence of the gens Manlia CIL II, 5161 CIL II, 5162, magistrates (duunvir belonging to the QUIRINA tribe CIL II, 5162), sexvir CIL II, 13, public slaves (balsensium dispensator, CIL II, 5164), evergetism (spectacle of naumachia and pugilate CIL II, 13, collective construction of a circus CIL II, 5165 CIL II, 5166 and other unidentified monuments CIL II, 5167), imperial cult IRCP 90 and a large proportion of Greek and North African names. A Roman citizen of Neapolis (Nabeul, Tunisia) with a daughter in Pax Iulia (Beja, Portugal) countryside, declares himself an incola of BALSA! CIL II, 105.

The level of Romanisation in BALSA can also be inferred from the known personal names (39 men and 16 women): 58% have tria nomina or are women with Latin dua nomina. 71% have a Roman nomen and the remaining 27% a single cognomen, these being mostly Greek names. Native name words in all forms (Celtic or Turdetanian) are a small minority (9%).

From the 3rd century comes a rare funerary monument in Greek, considered by some to be Christian CIL II, 5171, and a hoard of coins of Claudius Gothicus (268-270 CE) discovered in a bath sewer.

Imported terra sigillata and glassware form a continuous series between late Augustan wares (early Hispanic) and late African D, late Gallic and Focean, with the latest pieces dated from the 7th century. The overwhelming volume peak corresponds to South Gallic wares of the 1st century CE but the studied material is much limited topographically.

Fish preserve industries are well documented in the town and neighbourhood, as well as amphorae factories. Six garum producers are known in BALSA by their industrial brands: AEMHEL, OLYNT, LEVGEN, IVNIORVM, IMETVS F and DASIMVSTELI

== Urbanism and territory ==
Several testimonies describe the existence of very extensive and dense Roman building remains before 1977. The archaeological terrain has been being heavily destroyed since then to the present days (2008) by agricultural works and the building of suburban villas.

Archaeological exploration has been very limited to two necropolises, two bath buildings, three fish factories and a few structures. The larger part has been done in the 19th century, with pre-scientific standards. On the other hand, a total of sixty places with Roman findings are known in the archaeological perimeter of BALSA.

Archaeotopography revealed important and extensive urban structures: a theatre, a pier and internal harbour, a hippodrome, large hippodamic quarters and several others.

The urban centre had an extraordinary size for a municipal town without a capital status: the urban limits spawned no less than 116 acres (47 ha) and the peri-urban area occupied at least 266 acres (108 ha). Its plan reveals a double town, or a massive development juxtaposed in two urban moments.

The civitas territory corresponded to modern Eastern Algarve, bordering the province of Baetica and with an approximate area of 585 square miles (1,520 km^{2}), mostly occupied by hills then rich in forests and minerals.

Significant remains of Roman agrarian centuriations can still be traced in modern surveys, limited to the littoral plains where olive groves, vineyards and dry orchards are historically best adapted. The coast was formed by lagoons and estuaries, whose agro-maritime capacities were extensively exploited in Roman times.

The major fluvial road of river Anas (modern Guadiana) was controlled from BALSA territory along its better navigable part, draining several mining districts south of Myrtilis (Mértola, Portugal). Several better known villae or vici like "Pedras d'el-Rei", "Paul da Asseca", "Cacela", "Manta Rota", "Vale do Boto", "Álamo", "Montinho das Laranjeiras" and many others belonged to the territory of BALSA.

== Archaeology and heritage ==
Archaeological collections of BALSA are scattered by several museums and private collections. The best preserved objects are from funerary spoils (good collections of sigillata, glassware, lucernes and personal objects such a complete surgeon kit), a female bust from the Antonine epoch, 17 civic and funerary epigraphed stones, statuettes, coins, architectonic elements, etc.

In the present day there is practically nothing to be seen of BALSA. Almost all land became fenced private property, cutting most accesses to the public lagoon-shore, and the few known and visible archaeological remains are kept more or less hidden. With the present total lack of protection and real menace of total destruction it is better they remain like that for the time being.

However, notwithstanding the brutal destructions of the last 30 years, BALSA still has a major archaeological potential: the foundations of about 1/5 of the town extension, including maritime suburbs, ought to be still basically preserved, either buried, silted or submerged.

=== Public museums in Portugal with collections of BALSA ===
Museu Nacional de Arqueologia, Lisbon

Museu Municipal de Faro, Faro

Museu Paroquial de Moncarapacho, Moncarapacho (Olhão)

== Images ==
A large collection of pictures, graphics and maps of BALSA, its territory and the most important archaeological findings can be browsed at the on-line bibliographical references below, marked with (PIC).

== Bibliography (in development) ==
Practically all bibliography is in Portuguese. A growing number of studies below are being published on-line at Association Campo Arqueológico de Tavira

=== Synthesis studies ===
Vasco Gil Mantas: 1990, “As cidades marítimas da Lusitânia”, in Les Villes de Lusitanie romaine, CNRS, Paris

Vasco Gil Mantas: 1997, “As civitates: Esboço da geografia política e económica do Algarve romano”, in Noventa séculos entre a serra e o mar, IPPAR, Lisboa

Vasco Gil Mantas: 1997, “Os caminhos da serra e do mar”, in Noventa séculos entre a serra e o mar, IPPAR, Lisboa

Jeannette U. Smit Nolen: 1997, “Balsa, uma cidade romana no litoral algarvio”, in Noventa séculos entre a serra e o mar, IPPAR, Lisboa

Vasco Gil Mantas: 2003, “A cidade de Balsa”, in Tavira, Território e Poder, Museu Nacional de Arqueologia/C. M. de Tavira, Lisboa

Luís Fraga da Silva: 2005, Tavira Romana, Campo Arqueológico de Tavira, Tavira

Luís Fraga da Silva: 2007, Balsa, cidade perdida, Campo Arqueológico de Tavira e Câm. Mun. de Tavira, Tavira (PIC)

Luís Fraga da Silva: 2008, Balsa, cidade perdida, Exposição. Campo Arqueológico de Tavira e C. M. de Tavira, Tavira (PIC)

=== Archaeology ===
==== General ====
Sebastião Estácio da Veiga: 1866, Povos balsenses, Livraria Catholica, Lisboa

Augusto Carlos Teixeira de Aragão: 1868, Relatório sobre o Cemitério Romano descoberto próximo da cidade de Tavira em Maio de 1868, Imprensa Nacional, Lisboa

Abel Viena: 1952, "Balsa y la necrópolis romana de As Pedras de el-Rei",Archivo Español de Arqueologia, 25, Madrid, p. 261-285

Maria Luísa Estácio da Veiga A. dos Santos: 1971–2, Arqueologia Romana do Algarve, Associação dos Arqueólogos Portugueses, Lisboa

Maria Maia, Manuel Maia et alii: 1977, Relatórios de prospecção e escavação, Arquivo do Instituto Português de Arqueologia, Lisboa

José Fernandes Mascarenhas: 1978, Alguns subsídios arqueológicos sobre a antiga cidade de Balsa, Por Terras do Algarve, Ed. Autor, Lisboa

Cristina T Garcia.: 1989, Estação arqueológica da Luz (Tavira), Parque Natural da Ria Formosa, Olhão

==== Numismatics ====
Rosa V. Gomes e Mário V. Gomes: 1983, “Novas moedas hispânicas de Balsa e Ossonoba”, Nummus, 2.ª Série, Vol. IV a VI, Soc. Portuguesa de Numismática, Porto

Alexandre V. Cesário: 2005, Moedas de Balsa, Campo Arqueológico de Tavira, Tavira

==== Materials and objects ====
Raúl da C. Couvreur: 1958, Ensaio de estudo de uma Balança Romana, Arqueologia e História, 8ª séria, VIII, Associação dos Arqueólogos Portugueses, Lisboa: p 111–129

Vasco de Souza: 1990, Corpus Signorum Imperii Romani. Corpus der Skulpturen der Römischen Welt. Portugal, Universidade de Coimbra, Coimbra. Balsa: 115, 119, 125. Balsa territory: 113, 114, 118

Jeannette U. Smit Nolen: 1994, Cerâmicas e vidros da Torre de Ares (Balsa), Museu Nacional de Arqueologia, Lisboa

José Luis de Matos (coord.): 1995, Inventário do Museu Nacional de Arqueologia. Catálogo de esculturas romanas, Lisboa: Several references

v.v.a.a.: 2002, Exhibition catalogue. Loquuntur saxa. Religiões da Lusitânia, Museu Nacional de Arqueologia; Lisboa: Several references

v.v.a.a.: 2003: Exhibition catalogue, Tavira, Território e Poder, Museu Nacional de Arqueologia/C.M.Tavira, Lisboa: p 268–291

Catarina Viegas: 2006, A cidade romana de Balsa (1) A terra sigillata, C. M. de Tavira, Tavira

Luis Fraga da Silva: 2010, "Séries Temporais de Balsa. Da classificação de materiais arqueológicos à conjuntura socioeconómica do passado romano", Campo Arqueológico de Tavira, Tavira

==== Alimentary industries ====
L. Lagóstena Barrios, La producción de salsas y conservas de pescado en la Hispânia Romana (II a. C.-VI d. C.), Barcelona 2001: many references

==== Pre-Roman ====
Maria Maia: 2003, “Fenícios em Tavira”, in Tavira, Território e Poder, Museu Nacional de Arqueologia/C. M. de Tavira, Lisboa

Maria Maia: 2003, “O culto de Baal em Tavira”, Huelva Arqueológica (20). Actas del III Congreso Español de Antiguo Oriente Próximo, Huelva

Maria Maia: 2004, “Tavira Turdetana, porto do ‘Círculo do Estreito’ nos finais do séc. V a.C.”, in Conferencia Internacional: Historia de la Pesca en el Ámbito del Estrecho, Puerto de Santa Maria

=== Epigraphy and social studies ===
CIL: Corpus Inscriptionum Latinarum, Berlin-Brandenburg Academy of Sciences and Humanities, Berlin

IRCP: José d’Encarnação: 1984, Inscrições romanas do Conventus Pacensis, Universidade de Coimbra, Coimbra

E. Hübner: 1887, "Monumentos de Balsa (perto de Tavira)", Revista Archeologica e Histórica, Lisboa, p. 33-38

José d’Encarnação: 1987, “A população romana do litoral algarvio”, in Anais do Município de Faro, XVII, C. M. de Faro, Faro

Maria Alves Dias: 1989, “A propósito de duas inscrições romanas da Quinta deTorre d’Ares (Luz, Tavira)”, in O Arqueólogo Português, IV s. n° 6/7, Lisboa

José d’Encarnação: 2003, “Quão importantes eram as gentes!...”, in Tavira, Território e Poder, Museu Nacional de Arqueologia/C. M. de Tavira, Lisboa

=== Archaeotopography ===
Luís Fraga da Silva: 2005, Atlas de Balsa e Metodologia arqueo-topográfica, Campo Arqueológico de Tavira, Tavira (PIC)

Luís Fraga da Silva: 2011, Arqueo-topografia de Balsa Romana. Apresentação, Blog imprompto.blogspot.com (PIC)

== See also ==
- Circus (building) and Balsa Roman Circus
