= Jeannette Nolen =

Dutch archaeologist working in Portugal

- Born: Jeannette Ulrica Smit; 10 August 1930; Alblasserdam, Netherlands
- Died: 6 January 2016 (aged 85); Estoril, Portugal
- Other names: Jeannette Ulrica Smit-Nolen
- Occupation: Archaeologist
- Known for: Archaeological research in Portugal

Jeannette Nolen (1930–2016) was a Dutch archaeologist who carried out extensive research in Portugal.

Jeannette Ulrica Smit-Nolen was born on 10 August 1930 in Alblasserdam, Netherlands. She spent some time in the Netherlands and the United States. After her marriage to William Nolen, she worked at the American School of Classical Studies at Athens. This was considered to be too far away from the Netherlands where her husband remained. Thus, the couple visited Portugal to see the ruins of Conímbriga, one of the largest Roman settlements excavated in Portugal, and to investigate whether Jeannette Nolen could find a job in Portugal that was closer to the Netherlands. In Conímbriga, she met Jorge de Alarcão, Director of the Institute of Archaeology in Coimbra, and his wife, who launched her into Portuguese archaeology. The two couples were to become good friends. Her husband obtained a job as an English teacher at the University of Lisbon. They lived in the village of Janes, in the Municipality of Cascais.

One of her first works was the excavation of the Santo André Necropolis in Montargil, together with João Viegas and Maria Luísa Ferrer Dias. She then worked at Conímbriga with Dias on the restoration and analysis of materials. This was followed by work at the archaeological sites of São Cucufate and Monte da Cegonha at Vidigueira. She also collaborated in the study of materials from sites in and near Vila Viçosa, as part of the preparation for the reorganization of the museum there. During these various assignments she worked several times with Abel Viana.

Nolen was a founding member and later president of the Friends of the Portuguese National Museum of Archaeology, {Grupo de Amigos do Museu Nacional de Arqueologia (GAMNA)}. Among the studies to which her name is particularly linked are those on ceramic art and glass from Balsa at Torre de Ares in the Algarve region of Portugal; studies on ceramics from the necropoli of the Alto Alentejo Province for the Casa de Bragança Foundation; and her work for the Vila Viçosa museum.

In 1990, together with Catarina Viegas, Nolen excavated in Vale da Arrancada for the Museum of Portimão. In 2012, towards the end of her professional career, she analysed the glass instruments found in Tongóbriga, in the Marco de Canaveses municipality, near Porto. She developed a lasting connection with the Algarve, where she and her husband habitually spent their holidays. She was one of the founders of the Algarve Archaeological Association, which aims to safeguard the archaeological sites of the region. She actively collaborated with the association and was particularly adept at raising funds for its activities. She was also one of the founding members of the Cascais Cultural Association, living in Cascais and having studied the ceramics found in the Roman villa of Alto da Cidreira.

Jeannette Nolen died on 6 January 2016 at The British Retirement Home at São Pedro do Estoril. Her intellectual estate was donated to the Associação de Defesa do Património de Mértola (Association for the Protection of the Patrimony of Mértola).

== Works ==
- A grave group from Monte dos Irmãos (Montargil) (1981)
- A necrópole de Santo André (1981) (in cooperation with João Rosa Viegas and Luísa Ferrer Dias)
- A villa romana do Alto do Cidreira em Cascais (Boletim cultural do município de Cascais, 1982) (in cooperation with José de Encarnação and Guilherme Cardoso)
- Cerâmica comum de necrópoles do Alto Alentejo (1985)
- Vidros de S. Cucufate (1988)
- A villa romana do Alto do Cidreira (Alcabideche - Cascais): Os materiais (1988)
- A villa romana do Alto do Cidreira (Alcabideche - Cascais): os materiais. (1990)
- Cerâmicas e Vidros de Torre de Ares: Balsa (1994)
- Acerca da cronologia da cerâmica comum das necrópoles do Alto Alentejo: Novos elementos (O Arqueólogo Português, 1995-1997)
- Um grafito sobre a mulher de Úrbico (1997) (in cooperation with José de Encarnação)
- Um grafito romano de Torre de Palma (1997) (in cooperation with José de Encarnação)
- Grafito num púcaro de Torre de Palma (1997) (in cooperation with José de Encarnação)
- Prato com grafito da Tapada das Eirozes (Marco de Canaveses) (1997) (in cooperation with José de Encarnação)
- Um grafito romano da Tapada das Eirozes (Marco de Canaveses) (1997) (in cooperation with José de Encarnação)
- 220 – Urna cinerária; 221 – Urna cinerária; 222 – Taça (As Religiões da Lusitânia, 2002)
- Roteiro do Museu de Arqueologia do Castelo de Vila Viçosa (2004)
- A presença romana em Cascais: um território da Lusitânia ocidental (1997) (in cooperation with José de Encarnação et al)
- O museu de arqueologia de vila viçosa (2008-2009)
