= Luís Pinto de Sousa Coutinho, 1st Viscount of Balsemão =

Portuguese politician (1735–1804)

His Lordship The Viscount of Balsemão GCA
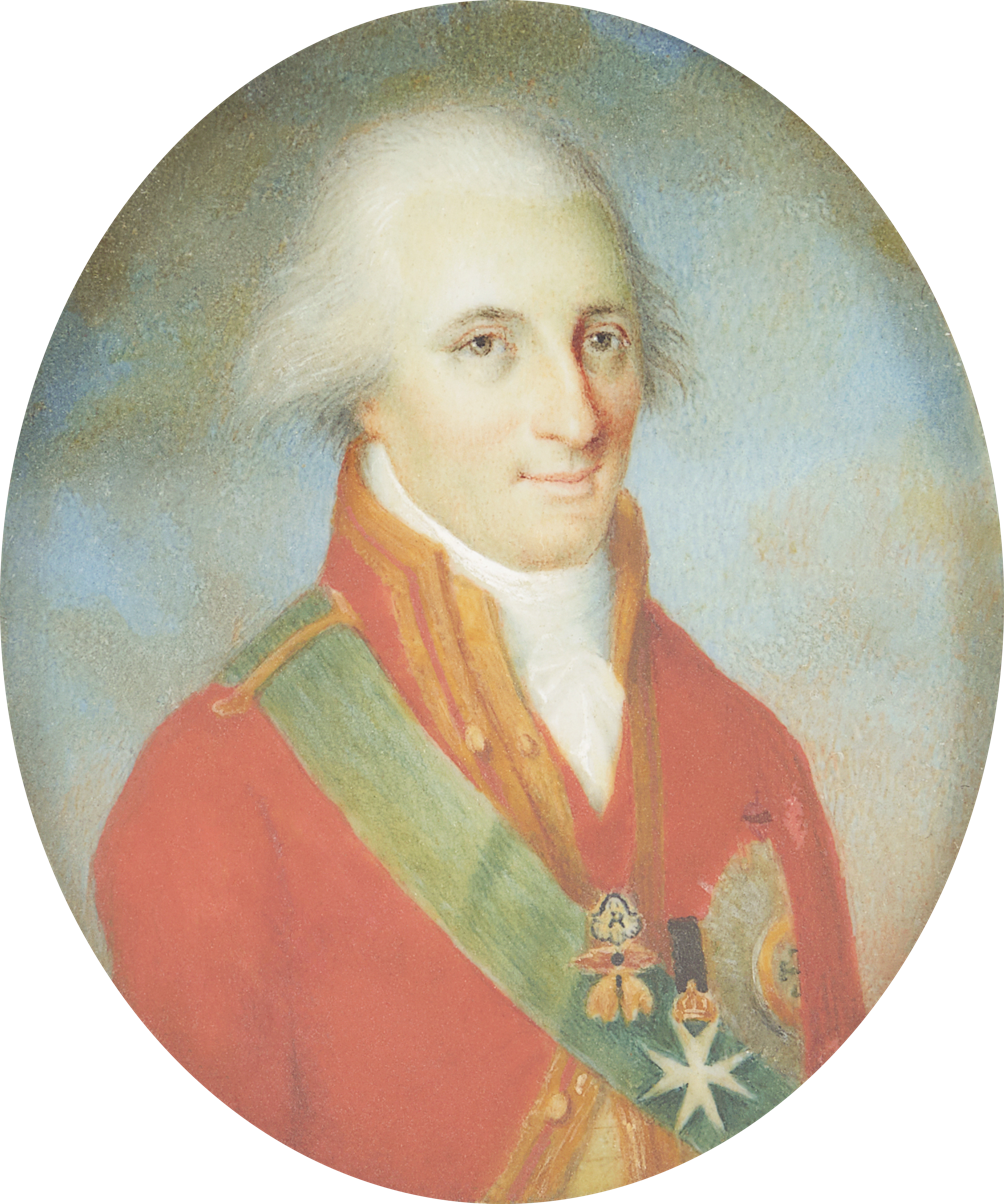

Secretary of State for the Internal Affairs of the Kingdom
- In office 6 January 1801 – 14 April 1804
- Monarch: Prince Regent John
- Preceded by: José de Seabra da Silva
- Succeeded by: The Count of Vila Verde

Secretary of State for Foreign Affairs and War
- In office 15 December 1788 – 6 January 1801
- Monarch: Maria I of Portugal
- Preceded by: Viscount Vila Nova de Cerveira
- Succeeded by: Rodrigo de Sousa Coutinho (as Secretary of Foreign Affairs); António de Araújo e Azevedo (as Secretary of War)

Portuguese Minister to Great Britain
- In office 8 July 1774 – 5 September 1788
- Monarch: Joseph I of Portugal
- Preceded by: João Filipe da Fonseca
- Succeeded by: Cipriano Ribeiro Pereira

Captain-General of Mato Grosso
- In office 3 January 1769 – 13 December 1772
- Monarch: Joseph I of Portugal
- Preceded by: João Pedro da Câmara
- Succeeded by: Luís de Albuquerque de Melo Pereira e Cáceres

Personal details
- Born: 27 November 1735 Leomil, Moimenta da Beira, Portugal
- Died: 14 April 1804 (aged 68) Belém, Lisbon, Portugal
- Spouse: Catarina Micaela de Sousa César de Lencastre
- Occupation: Politician

D. Luís Pinto de Sousa Coutinho, 1st Viscount of Balsemão (27 November 1735 – 14 April 1804), was a Portuguese nobleman, politician, colonial administrator, and diplomat.

The first of many government posts, Sousa Coutinho was chosen to serve as Captain-General of Mato Grosso, in Brazil, from 1769 until he was forced to resign in 1772 due to having contracted a severe ophthalmia.

Luís Pinto de Sousa Coutinho was the Portuguese envoy extraordinary and minister plenipotentiary in Great Britain from 1774 to 1788, from which he accompanied important events such as the American Revolutionary War, and negotiated Portugal's entry into the First League of Armed Neutrality. He was elected Fellow of the Royal Society in 1787.

Balsemão wrote the 1778 manuscript, Extrait des Notes fournies à Mr l’Abbé Raynal, which describes colonial administration in Brazil and offers a vision of state building. In a 1780 version of the manuscript, Balsemão defended what he said was the benign nature of slavery in Brazil.

He was made Viscount of Balsemão by Prince Regent John by decree of 14 August 1801, after having occupied several government posts.

== Marriage and children ==
He married Catarina de Lencastre a celebrated poet, and had 2 sons and 4 daughters, including :

- Luis Máximo Alfredo Pinto de Sousa Coutinho (1774—1832), 2nd Viscount of Balsemão. Had issue.
- Aires Pinto de Sousa Coutinho (1778–1836), 7th Captain-General of the Azores
