= 1822 in Portugal =

- Centuries: 17th; 18th; 19th; 20th; 21st
- Decades: 1800s; 1810s; 1820s; 1830s; 1840s
- See also: List of years in Portugal

Events in the year 1822 in Portugal.

== Incumbents ==
- Monarch: John VI
- Minister of the Kingdom: Filipe Ferreira de Araújo e Castro

== Events ==
- New Constitution
- 7 September - Independence of Brazil
- Establishment of the Carbonária

== Deaths ==
- 19 February - Jerónimo Francisco de Lima, composer
- 19 November - Manuel Fernandes Tomás (born 1771)
