= 1826 in Portugal =

- Centuries: 17th; 18th; 19th; 20th; 21st
- Decades: 1800s; 1810s; 1820s; 1830s; 1840s
- See also: List of years in Portugal

Events in the year 1826 in Portugal.

== Incumbents ==
- Monarch: John VI (until 10 March); Peter IV (until 2 May); Mary II

== Births ==
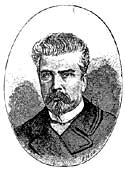
Miguel Ângelo Lupi

- 8 May – Miguel Ângelo Lupi, painter (died 1883)
- 27 November – António Augusto Soares de Passos (died 1860)

== Deaths ==
- 10 March – John VI of Portugal, king (born 1767).
