= Lacobriga =

Coordinates: 37°6′10″N 8°40′22″W

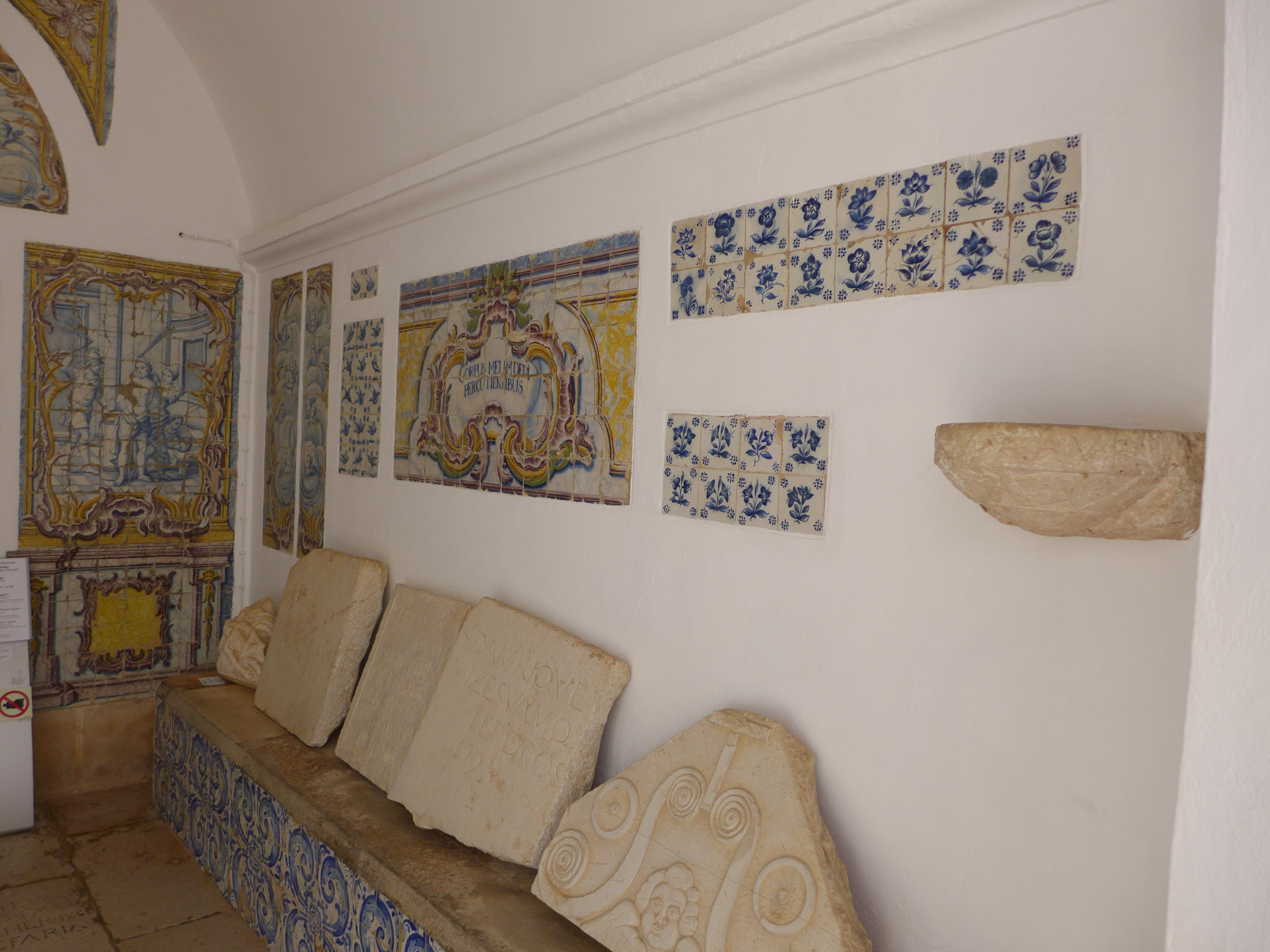
Roman Epigrafia do Museu de Lagos

Lacobriga (Laccobriga or Lacóbriga (Lacobrica in Latin)) was an ancient town of Celtic origin, usually identified as the predecessor of the current city of Lagos in Portugal. The nearby Archaeological Site of Monte Molião is also known as Lacobriga.

Founded by the Conii around 1899 BC, there is evidence of Phoenician presence around the seventh century BC.

It was conquered by the Carthaginians under Hamilcar Barca, who then recruited Celtic tribesmen in the Punic Wars against the Romans. The original settlement was destroyed by an earthquake in the fourth century BC. Following the disaster, the Carthaginian captain Boodes resettled the city on its current location in 250 BC.

Owing to its important harbor, it was colonized by the Romans and integrated into the Roman province of Lusitania, becoming known as Lacobriga.

In 76 BC Quintus Sertorius, a rebellious Roman general, helped by the Lusitanians of Lacobriga (who had been oppressed under Roman Generals and members of Lucius Cornelius Sulla party), defeated the Roman army of Caecilius Metellus Pius probably at nearby Monte Molião.

With the fall of the Western Roman Empire, the town was occupied in the 6th century by the Visigoths from the Kingdom of Toledo and later by the Byzantines.

== See also ==
- Barragem Romana da Fonte Coberta
- Pax Iulia
- Lusitania
