= Baron of Balsemão =

Barony Balsemão
- Creation date: 31 May 1847
- Created by: Maria II of Portugal
- First holder: José Alvo Brandão Pinto de Sousa Coutinho, 1st Baron of Balsemão
- Status: Extinct

Baron of Balsemão was a noble title created by Queen Maria II of Portugal, by Decree dated 31 May 1847, in favour of José Alvo Brandão Pinto de Sousa Coutinho, a naval officer and colonial administrator. The third son of the 2nd Viscount of Balsemão and bearer of the Honours of Grandee, he was granted the title of Baron in recognition of his distinguished service in the colonial administration of Angola and Mozambique.

== Barons of Balsemão (1874) ==
#	Name	Notes
1	José Alvo Brandão Pinto de Sousa Coutinho	1st Baron of Balsemão. Third son of the 2nd Viscount of Balsemão, with Honours of Grandee.

== Coat of arms ==
A shield: on a silver field, five red crescents arranged in saltire.

Crest: a silver lion with red tongue and claws, bearing a crescent upon its sword.

== Notes ==
- This article was initially translated, in whole or in part, from the Portuguese Wikipedia article titled “Barão de Balsemão”.
