= 1820 in Portugal =

- Centuries: 17th; 18th; 19th; 20th; 21st
- Decades: 1800s; 1810s; 1820s; 1830s; 1840s
- See also: List of years in Portugal

Events in the year 1820 in Portugal.

== Incumbents ==
- Monarch: John VI

== Events ==
- 22 January – Battle of Tacuarembó
- Liberal Revolution
- 24 August – Military revolt in Porto
- Establishment of a provisional junta of the Supreme Government of the Kingdom, in Porto
- 15 September – Military revolt in Lisbon
- Establishment of an interim government, in Lisbon
- 28 September – Establishment of a unified provisional junta
- 22 November – Instruções, first election law
- December – Cortes election
