= João Cosme da Cunha =

Portuguese cardinal (1715–1783)

His Eminence João Cosme da Cunha
- Cardinal
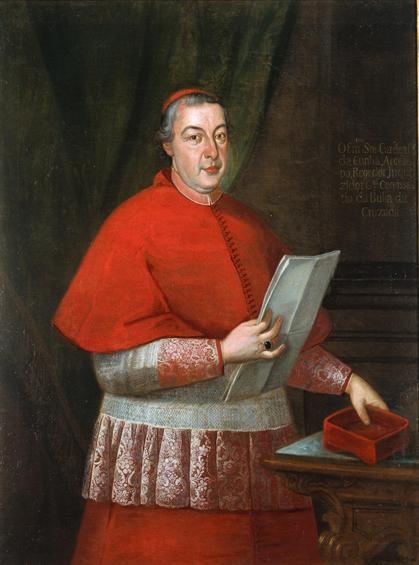
- Portrait of D. João Cosme da Cunha (1715-1783)
- Archdiocese: Évora
- Appointed: 24 May 1760
- In office: 1760-1783
- Predecessor: Miguel de Távora
- Successor: Joaquim Xavier Botelho de Lima
- Previous post: Bishop of Leiria (1746–1760)

Orders
- Ordination: 22 May 1740
- Consecration: 29 June 1746 by Tomás de Almeida
- Created cardinal: 6 August 1770 by Pope Clement XIV
- Rank: Cardinal-Priest

Personal details
- Born: 20 October 1715 Lisbon, Portugal
- Died: 31 January 1783 (aged 67) Lisbon, Portugal
- Denomination: Roman Catholic

João Cosme da Cunha (known as "Cardinal da Cunha"), C.R.S.A. (Lisbon, 20 October 1715 – Lisbon, 31 January 1783), was a Portuguese cardinal, politician, Archbishop of Évora, and Inquisitor-General of Portugal.

== Biography ==
The son of D. Manuel Carlos de Távora, Count of São Vicente, and D. Isabel de Noronha, he held a degree in law. In 1738, he took the habit of the Order of the Holy Cross (Santa Cruz), adopting the name Friar João de Nossa Senhora da Porta. He was ordained a priest on 22 May 1740.

On 8 April 1746, he was appointed Bishop of Leiria. He was consecrated on 29 June by Cardinal Tomás de Almeida, Patriarch of Lisbon.

In the immediate aftermath of the 1755 Lisbon earthquake, he walked barefoot through the rubble-strewn streets of Lisbon, wearing a noose around his neck and carrying only a crucifix, calling upon the living to repent and for prayers to be offered for the dead.

In 1759, he was chosen by the King for the Archbishopric of Évora and confirmed by the Pope in 1760. Nevertheless, he continued to reside in Lisbon at the request of the Marquis of Pombal. Pombal was his patron since the time he was Bishop of Leiria, when he had authored a pastoral letter accusing the Jesuits of complicity in the attempted regicide of 3 September 1758.

Though intellectually mediocre and possessing only a rudimentary education, he nonetheless managed to ingratiate himself with the King and the Marquis of Pombal, maintaining significant influence at court for many years. The Marquis of Pombal would later appoint him as an inspector for the reconstruction of the capital. In 1768, he was chosen to preside over the newly created Royal Board of Censorship ("Real Mesa Censória").

In 1760, he was appointed a Councilor of State and Chief Justice of the High court of appeals ("Casa da Suplicação") ), and authorized the banishment of the King’s illegitimate brothers, known as the Children of Palhavã to Buçaco. In 1768, he sanctioned the imprisonment without trial, of Miguel da Anunciação, Bishop of Coimbra, who was not released until 1777. On 6 February 1770, he was appointed Inquisitor-General of Portugal, a position he held until his death in 1783.

On 6 August 1770, at the request of the Marquis of Pombal, he was elevated to the cardinalate by Pope Clement XIV. He didn't attend the exceptionally long 1774–1775 conclave, which elected Pius VI as pontiff.

In 1772, he was appointed Minister-Assistant to the Royal Dispatch (*ministro assistente ao despacho*), a role he retained until the end of the Marquis of Pombal’s administration in 1777.
He is believed to have been the schemer responsible for the downfall of José de Seabra da Silva in 1774.
