= 1825 in Portugal =

- Centuries: 17th; 18th; 19th; 20th; 21st
- Decades: 1800s; 1810s; 1820s; 1830s; 1840s
- See also: List of years in Portugal

Events in the year 1825 in Portugal.

== Incumbents ==
- Monarch: John VI

== Births ==
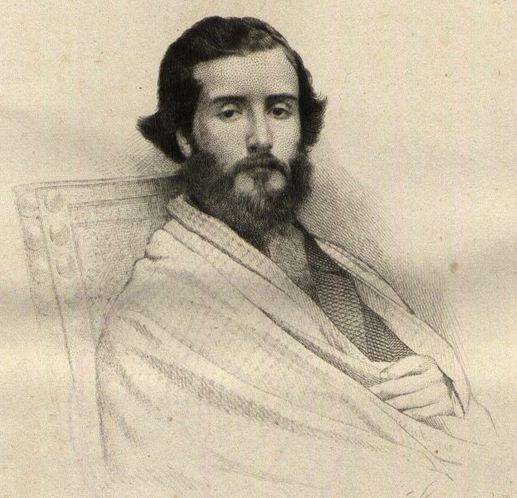
Francisco Augusto Metrass

- 7 February – Francisco Augusto Metrass, painter (d. 1861).
- 20 November – António de Serpa Pimentel, politician (died 1900)

== Deaths ==
- May 5 - José Joaquim Champalimaud
- August 22 - António Marcelino da Vitória
- Christian Adolph Friedrich Eben
