= Teixeira de Aragão =

Portuguese officer, doctor, numismatist, archaeologist and historian

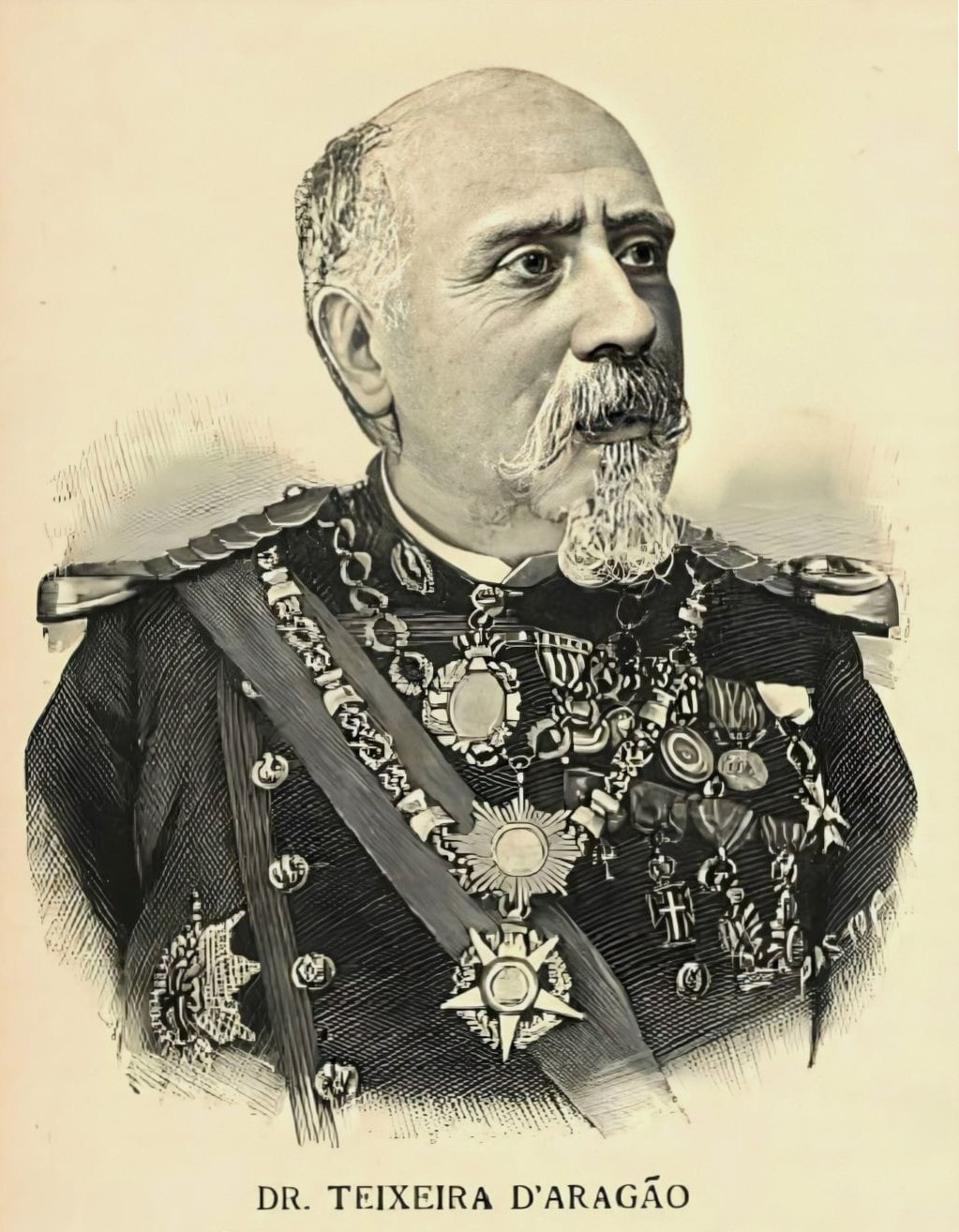
- Born: Augusto Carlos Teixeira de Aragão; 15 June 1823; Lisbon, Kingdom of Portugal
- Died: 29 April 1903 (aged 79); Lisbon, Kingdom of Portugal
- Education: University of Lisbon
- Occupations: Military, surgeon, numismatist, archaeologist and historian

Augusto Carlos Teixeira de Aragão ComA • CavC • CavA • CavTE (15 June 1823 – 29 April 1903) was a Portuguese officer, doctor, numismatist, archaeologist and historian. As an officer of the Portuguese army, he retired with the rank of general. Teixeira de Aragão is considered one of the "fathers" of Portuguese numismatics.

== Biography ==
He was the son of José Maria Teixeira de Aragão and his wife, Mariana Hermógenes da Silva. He graduated in medicine, having reached the position of surgeon-in-chief of the Portuguese Army.

As a surgeon in the parish of Melides in the county of Santiago do Cacém, he participated with aiding the victims of the 1849 dysentery epidemic.

From an early age, he devoted himself to collecting numismatics, which paired with his extraordinary intellectual activity and a friendship with the King Luis I of Portugal. This allowed him to delve in depth to this field of science.

In the 1860s, he was one of the responsibles for the work of rediscovery of the archaeological site of the Roman town Balsa in Tavira.

In 1867, he acted as Conservative of the Office of the Ajuda National Palace, and was responsible for organizing, cataloging and exhibition of the contents of the collection of the Ajuda Antiquities Museum. They assembled pieces of great value belonging to the treasury of the Portuguese Royal House, the extinct convents and individuals. During the performance of these functions, Teixeira de Aragão was entrusted with the task of bringing some of the objects of the Portuguese Royal Collection at the Exposition Universelle (1867) of Paris. The Commission de l'histoire du Travail of this exhibition attributed the gold medal to the collection. During the period of exposure, Teixeira de Aragão had the opportunity to get in touch with the world's most renowned personalities in the field of numismatics.

In 1870, he published Descrição Histórica das Moedas Romanas Existentes no Gabinete Numismático de sua Majestade El-Rei O Senhor D. Luiz I. A year later, he was admitted as a corresponding member of the Brazilian Historical and Geographical Institute by the Commission of Archaeology and Ethnography.

In 1874, he joined the Independence Historical Society of Portugal-SHIP, having occupied the post of vice-treasurer of the Central Committee of 1 December 1640.

In 1875, went public with the first of three volumes of the monumental work of the Descrição Geral e Histórica das Moedas Cunhadas em Nome dos Reis, Regentes e Governadores de Portugal. Teixeira de Aragão came to planning a fourth volume of this work, which include the currencies of Brazil and Portuguese West Africa countries, which failed to materialize.

In the same year was part of the Commission of the Royal Academy of Fine Arts, appointed by the Government of the time, with the aim to propose the reform of Education of Fine Arts, the plan for the organization of museums, and service of Historic Monuments and archeology.

He reproduced the exact design of the Medal of Olhão that Olhanenses granted to the then Prince Regent D. João.

On 28 December 1876, he was elected to the section of History and Archaeology at the Royal Academy of Sciences of Lisbon.

In 1877, participated in the archaeological conference's Citânia de Briteiros in Guimarães.

In 1880, he was appointed Royal Commissioner by the Academy of Sciences in order to proceed with the preparation and implementation of the program of repatriating remains of Vasco da Gama, from the Church of the Convent of Our Lady of Relics in Vidigueira to the Jeronimos Monastery where he still remain.

He became a member of the commission created by the Portuguese Royal Association of Architects and Civil Archeologos (RAACAP). The association's main objective was related to the equity issue by holding exhibitions to governments on the conservation of historical monuments.

In the year 1881, he was part of the organizing committee nominated for the exhibition Special Loan Exhibition of Spanish and Portuguese Ornamental Art displayed at the South Kensington Museum in London.

He was a member of the Geographical Society of Lisbon, the "Société Française de Numismatique" and the Committee of Antiquities of the "Real Academia de la Historia de Madrid". In Brazil, was admitted as a counselor to Historical and Geographical Institute of São Paulo.

== Work ==
- As minhas ferias. Lisboa: Typographia da Academia das Bellas Artes, 1843. 64p. (in Portuguese)
- O Hercules Preto. Lisboa: Typographia de Martins, 1846. 268p. (in Portuguese)
- Vidigueira: Fragmentos históricos. Beja: O Bejense, 1861. (in Portuguese)
- Vidigueira: Convento do Carmo. Beja: O Bejense, 1861. (in Portuguese)
- Algumas causas que podem contribuir para a frequência tísica nos alunos do Real Colégio Militar. Escholiaste Médico. 1866. (in Portuguese)
- Description des Monnaies, Médailles et Autres Objects D'Art Concernant L'Histoire Portugaise. Paris: Imprimerie Administrative de Paul Dupont, 1867. 171p. (in French)
- Notes sur quelques numismates portugais des XVIIe, XVIIIe et XIXe siècles : lettre a M. le vicomte de Ponton d'Amécourt. Paris: Pillet, 1867. (in French)
- Relatório sobre o Cemitério Romano Descoberto próximo da cidade de Tavira em Maio de 1868. Lisboa: Imprensa Nacional, 1868. 20p. (in Portuguese)
- Catálogo descriptivo das moedas e medalhas portuguezas que formam parte da colecção do Visconde de Sanches de Baena. Lisboa: Typographia de Castro Irmão, 1869. (in Portuguese)
- Descripção Histórica das Moedas Romanas existentes no Gabinete Numismático de sua Magestade EL-Rei O Senhor Dom Luiz I. Typographya Universal, 1870. 640p. (in Portuguese)
- D. Vasco da Gama e a Villa da Vidigueira D. Vasco da Gama e a Villa da Vidigueira. Lisboa: Typographya Universal, 1871. (in Portuguese)
- Typos politicos: Mestre Manoel Camões. Lisboa: Almanach Arsejas - Liv. Arsejas, 1872. (in Portuguese)
- Descrição geral e histórica das moedas cunhadas em nome dos reis, regentes e governadores de Portugal (Tomo I). Lisboa: Imprensa Nacional, 1875. 538p. (in Portuguese)
- Descrição geral e histórica das moedas cunhadas em nome dos reis, regentes e governadores de Portugal (Tomo II).Lisboa: Imprensa Nacional, 1877. 578p. (in Portuguese)
- Descrição geral e histórica das moedas cunhadas em nome dos reis, regentes e governadores de Portugal (Tomo III). Lisboa: Imprensa Nacional, 1880. 714p. (in Portuguese)
- Revista Militar Tomo XXXVIII. Lisboa, 1886.P548-551. (in Portuguese)
- Vasco da Gama e a Vidigueira: Estudo historico. Lisboa: Imprensa Nacional, 1887. 164p. (in Portuguese)
- Anneis: Estudo. Lisboa: Typographia da Academia Real das Sciencias, 1887. 25 p. (in Portuguese)
- Breve noticia sobre o descobrimento da América. Lisboa: Typographya da Academia Real das Sciencias, 1892. 80p. (in Portuguese)
- Catálogo dos objectos de arte e industria dos indígenas da América que, pelas festas commemorativas do 4º centenário da sua descoberta, a Academia Real das Sciencias de Lisboa envia à Exposição de Madrid. Lisboa: Typographya da Academia Real das Sciencias, 1892. 44p. (in Portuguese)
- Diabruras, santidades e prophecias. Lisboa: Typographya da Academia Real das Sciencias, 1894. 151p. (in Portuguese)
- A Torocentese ou Operação do Empiema. Lisboa 1894. (in Portuguese)
- Antiguidades romanas de Balsa. Lisboa: O Archeologo Português, 1896.N.º2.p55-57. (in Portuguese)
- Memoria historica sobre os Palacios da residencia dos V. Reys da India. Manuscrito. (in Portuguese)

== Awards and honours ==
- Knight of the Military Order of the Tower and of the Sword, of Valour, Loyalty and Merit (1868) (Portugal).
- Knight of the Royal Military Order of Christ (Portugal).
- Commander of the Order of the Immaculate Conception of Vila Viçosa (Portugal).
- Commander of the Royal Military Order of Aviz (1870) (Portugal).
- Grand Officer of the Royal Military Order of Aviz (Portugal).
- Knight of the Royal Military Order of Aviz (1874) (Portugal).
- Knight of the Order of the Iron Crown (Austria).
- Knight of the Royal Order of Charles III (Spain).
- Commander of the Royal Order of Charles III (Spain).
- Knight of the Order of the White Elephant (Siam).
- Knight of the Order of Nichan Iftikhar (Tunisia).
- Three silver medals in the Class of Military Value, Good Services and Outstanding Behaviour.
- Teixeira de Aragão Medal - minted by the Portuguese Society of Numismatics in 1963 in patinated bronze, with a diameter of 70 millimetres (2.8 in) and weight of 163 grams (5.7 oz).
- Praça Doutor Teixeira de Aragão – a public square in the parish of Benfica, Lisbon – was named after him.

== Bibliography ==
- BOTELHO, Luis Silveira. Médicos na toponímia de Lisboa. Lisboa: Câmara Municipal. Comissão Municipal de Toponímia, 1992. p183-184 il. (in Portuguese)
- CORDEIRO, Valdemar. DO MODESTO DISCÍPULO-AO MESTRE TEIXEIRA DE ARAGÃO. Nº 33 VOL. X-2. NVMMVS - Boletim da Sociedade Portuguesa de Numismática. Porto. Dezembro 1974. p9-14. (in Portuguese)
- Grande Enciclopédia Portuguesa e Brasileira. Teixeira de Aragão. Lisboa:Editorial Enciclopédia Lda. 1936-1960. Vol31, p51. (in Portuguese)
- FERNANDES, Manuel Bernardo Lopes. Memoria das medalhas e condecorações portuguezas e das estrangeiras com relação a Portugal.Lisboa: Typographya. 1861. p62-63. (in Portuguese)
- FERREIRA, Licínia Rodrigues. Sócios do Instituto de Coimbra: 1852-1978. Coimbra:[s.n.], 2012. p12. (in Portuguese)
- INCM - Exposição Numismática - Colecção D. Luís. Lisboa|Vila Viçosa. (in Portuguese)
- LIMA, Joaquim Falcão de.Gente de Entre Searas e Montados. Guarda-Mor. 2008. p174. (in Portuguese)
- MARQUES, J.A.. Escholiaste Médico. Nº 296, 301, 303 e 305 Vol. XVIII, 1867. (in Portuguese)
- MATEU Y LLOPIS, Felipe. Cartas inéditas de Teixeira de Aragão. Revista de Guimarães. Separata de fasc. 1-2 do volume LIX. Guimarães [s.n.], 1948.p113-119. (in Portuguese)
- Nota biográfica. O CENTENÁRIO DE UMA OBRA DE NUMISMÁTICA. Nº 33 VOL. X-2. NVMMVS - Boletim da Sociedade Portuguesa de Numismática. Porto. Dezembro 1974. p1-7. (in Portuguese)
- PEIXOTO, António Rocha. Os Mortos. Portugália - Materiaes para o estudo do povo portuguez. Porto: Portugália, tomo I, n.º 4 (24 Outubro 1903), p863. (in Portuguese)
- PEREIRA, João Manuel Esteves e RODRIGUES, Guilherme. Augusto Carlos Teixeira de Aragão. Diccionario historico, chorographico, heraldico, biographico, bibliographico, numismatico e artistico.VOL I-A. Lisboa. João Romano Torres. 1904. p631-632. (in Portuguese)
- VASCONCELOS, António L. T. C. Pestana de. Costados Alentejanos. 2ª edição. Évora. 2005. p101. (in Portuguese)
- VASCONCELOS, José Leite de. Teixeira de Aragão e Cartas inéditas de vários escritores dirigidas a Teixeira de Aragão . O Archeologo Português. Lisboa. IX, 1904, p134-142, XI, p252, XII, p104, XIII, 1908, p357, XXIX, 1933, p218-222.Da Numismática em Portugal. Lisboa, s.n., 1923. (in Portuguese)
- VENCES E COSTA, C.. General Augusto Carlos Teixeira de Aragão - Perfil biográfico de um ilustre colaborador da Cruz Vermelha Portuguesa. Boletim Informação. Lisboa: Cruz Vermelha Portuguesa, 1985.p4-5 e p17. (in Portuguese)
- XAVIER, Hugo. O "Museu de Antiguidades" da Ajuda: Numismática e Ourivesaria das Coleções Reais ao tempo de D. Luís. Revista de História da Arte nº8. Instituto de História da Arte FCSH/UNL. 2011. p70-87. (in Portuguese)
