= Inácio da Costa Quintela =

Inácio da Costa Quintela (1763 – 6 December 1838) was a Portuguese naval officer, historian, poet and politician.

== Life ==
Born in Lisbon, he graduated from the Academia de Marinha in 1791 and entered the navy. He rose quickly through the officer ranks and by 1797 he was in command of a frigate in the Mediterranean as part of a force under the marquês de Nisa. He distinguished himself in a battle with a French frigate on 15 May 1801, in which he only surrendered when he could no longer fight back (as in the law of the sea at this period) when at the outset of the battle he had no chance against a more heavily armed opponent, which might have meant death.

He commanded the Afonso, on which the Portuguese royal family escaped to Brazil in November 1807. Rising to vice-admiral around 1811, he served under Don Carlos as admiral-general. He was appointed minister of the kingdom (equivalent to prime minister) on 24 February 1821 and after John VI's return to Portugal he became Naval Minister until the return of absolutism known as the Vilafrancada. After taking the oath to uphold the Constitutional Charter on 31 July 1826, Quintela was re-appointed Naval Minister but in December that year he retired from all public office, since he no longer identified with the new government's aims.

In retirement he wrote the "Anais da Marinha Portuguesa" (Annals of the Portuguese Navy), which he never completed and which was published posthumously by the Lisbon Academy of Sciences, of which he had been a member in 1830 and 1840. He also wrote a verse translation of Virgil's Aeneid and supposedly some poems from Horace's Odes, published in the Anais da Ciência das Artes e das Letras. He died in Lisbon.

Preceded by Tomás Antônio de Vila-Nova Portugal	Minister and Secretary of State for the Affairs of the Kingdom of Brazil; 1821	Succeeded by Marcos de Noronha e Brito
