= Tomás Xavier de Lima Teles da Silva, 1st Marquis of Ponte de Lima =

His Excellency The Marquis of Ponte de Lima KC FC
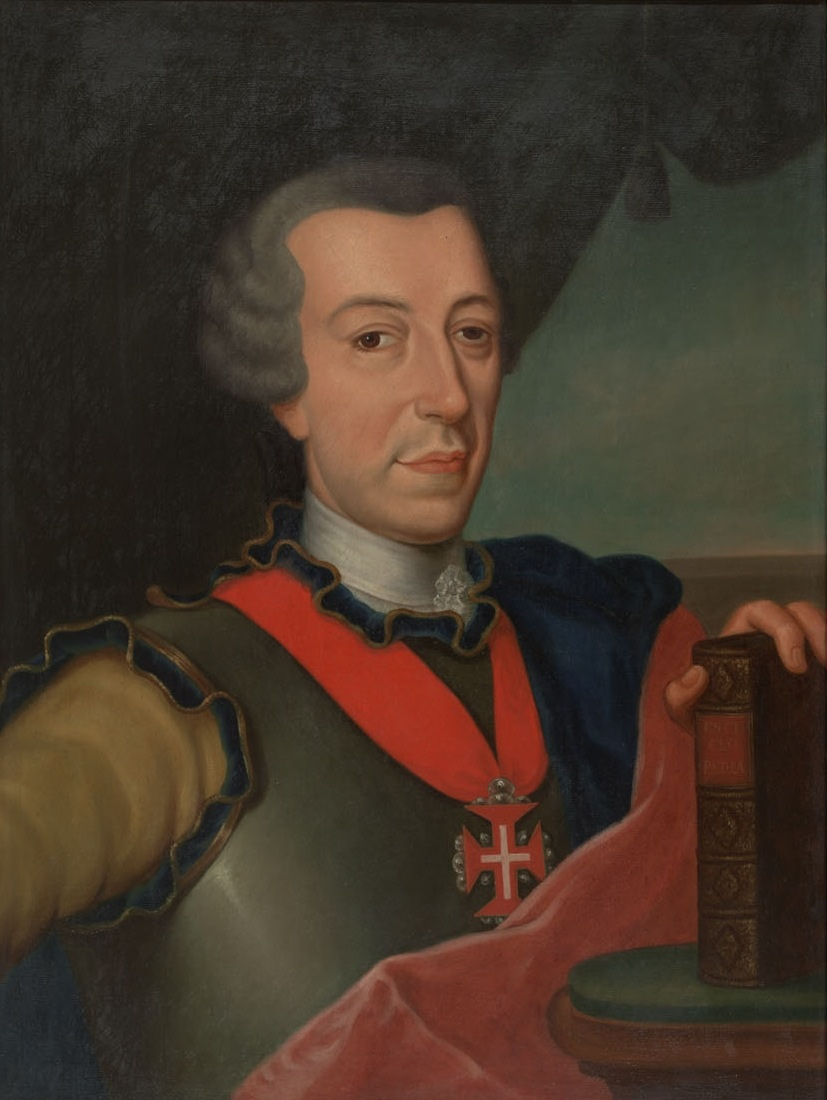

Secretary of the State of the Kingdom of Portugal and the Algarves
- In office 1 April 1786 – 15 December 1788
- Monarch: Maria I of Portugal
- Preceded by: Martinho de Melo e Castro
- Succeeded by: Viscount of Balsemão

Secretary of Foreign Affairs and War of the Kingdom of Portugal and the Algarves
- In office 1 April 1786 – 15 December 1788
- Monarch: Maria I of Portugal
- Preceded by: Martinho de Melo e Castro
- Succeeded by: Viscount of Balsemão

Personal details
- Born: 12 October 1727
- Died: 23 December 1800 (aged 73)
- Spouse: Eugénia Maria Josefa of Braganza
- Occupation: Politician

Tomás Xavier de Lima Teles da Silva, 1st Marquis of Ponte de Lima, 13th Count of Vila Nova de Cerveira (12 October 1727 — 23 December 1800), was a Portuguese nobleman, statesman, and historian.

== Career ==
Tomás Xavier de Lima Teles da Silva was a Fidalgo of the Royal Household of Maria I of Portugal and a knight of the Order of Christ. He was a supporter of João de Almeida Portugal who tried to rehabilitate his father, Tomás Teles da Silva, who was convicted in the Távora affair.

He served as the head of the Portuguese government from 1786 to 1788.
