= Catarina de Lencastre, Viscountess of Balsemão =

Portuguese noblewoman, poet, and playwright

Her Ladyship The Viscountess of Balsemão
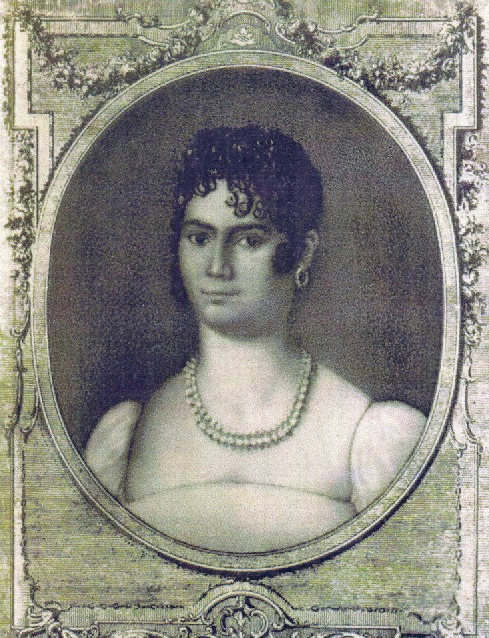
- Born: Catarina Micaela de Sousa César e Lencastre; 29 September 1749; Guimarães, Portugal
- Died: 4 January 1824 (aged 74); Porto, Portugal
- Spouse: Luís Pinto de Sousa Coutinho, 1st Viscount of Balsemão
- Writing career
- Pen name: Natércia, Coríntia, Célia, Safo Portuguesa ("Portuguese Sappho")

D. Catarina Micaela de Sousa César e Lencastre (29 September 1749 — 4 January 1824) was a Portuguese noblewoman, and a poet and playwright. While a celebrated author during her lifetime, most of her work remains unpublished.

== Biography ==
D. Catarina was born in Guimarães on 29 September 1749 — the Feast of Saint Michael, the reason why her second given name was Micaela — the daughter of Francisco Filipe de Sousa da Silva Alcoforado (fidalgo of the Royal Household, Lord of Vila Pouca, Familiar of the Holy Office), and his wife, D. Rosa Maria Viterbo de Lencastre (daughter of the 3rd Viscounts of Asseca).

She was married by proxy on 31 August 1767 to Luís Pinto de Sousa Coutinho, at the time the Captain-General and Governor of Mato Grosso, in Brazil. When her husband was named envoy to Great Britain in 1774, she accompanied him to London where, soon enough, she hosted people notable in arts, letters, and sciences, turning the Portuguese embassy into a salon littéraire.

After definitely returning to Portugal, she became closely acquainted with the Marquise of Alorna. She became known as Safo Portuguesa ("the Portuguese Sappho") due to her poems in celebration of love.

=== Children ===
She had 2 sons and 4 daughters from her marriage with Luís Pinto de Sousa Coutinho, 1st Viscount of Balsemão, including :

- Luis Máximo Alfredo Pinto de Sousa Coutinho (1774—1832), 2nd Viscount of Balsemão. Had issue.
- Aires Pinto de Sousa Coutinho (1778–1836), 7th Captain-General of the Azores
