= Francisco Gomes de Amorim =

Portuguese poet and dramatist

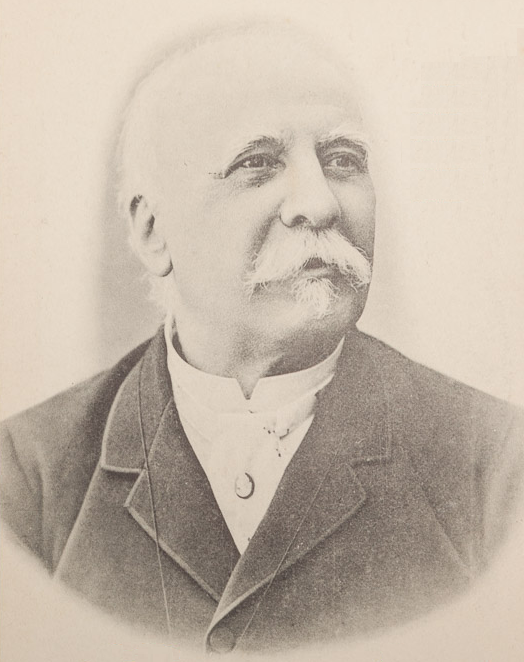
Francisco Gomes de Amorim

Francisco Gomes de Amorim (13 August 1827 in Póvoa de Varzim, Portugal – 4 November 1891 in Lisbon) was a Portuguese poet and dramatist who was a friend of Almeida Garrett. One can find his collaboration in several periodicals: O Panorama (1837–1868), Revista universal lisbonense (1841–1859), the Illustração Luso-Brasileira (1856–1859), Arquivo pitoresco (1857–1868), O Pantheon (1880–1881), Ribaltas e gambiarras (1881) and Tiro civil (1895–1903).
