= Estácio da Veiga =

Portuguese archeologist and writer

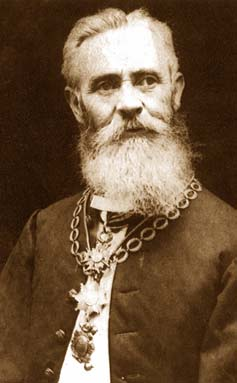
- Born: 6 May 1828; Tavira, Portugal
- Died: 7 December 1891 (aged 63); Lisbon, Portugal

Sebastião Phillipes Martins Estácio da Veiga (6 May 1828 in Tavira – 7 December 1891 in Lisbon), was a Portuguese archeologist and writer, known for having discovered several important archeological sites in the Algarve and having made advancements in the study of several others also found in the region and in the Alentejo.

== Biography ==
Carta Archeologica do Algarve 1878

Estácio da Veiga was born in Tavira on 6 May 1828. He studied at Faro's high-school, moving afterwards to Lisbon to study at the Escola Politécnica de Lisboa, following the career of secretary official of the Post-Office General Sub-Inspection of the Kingdom.

In 1876, after the strong rain season that occurred in the Algarve, the Fontes Pereira de Melo office charged him with the inventory of all archeological remnants that were to be discovered in the region (as in the case of the Roman Ruins of Milreu, the Roman fish processing plants in Praia da Luz and others found in the Alentejo). The result of his work was called Carta Arqueológica do Algarve (1878), concluded with the installation of the Museu Arqueológico do Algarve, in Lisbon.

In 1880, Estácio da Veiga hosted the International Congress of Anthropology and Pre-History Archeology, in Lisbon.

Estácio da Veiga was a member of several scientific societies, some of the most predominant being the Academia das Ciências de Lisboa, Rome Archeologic Institute, Archeologic French Society, the Real Academia de História de Madrid, the Belgian Archeology Institute and the Instituto Arqueológico e Geográfico de Pernambuco, in Brazil.

Estácio da Veiga had achieved the status of knight nobleman (fidalgo cavaleiro) of the Royal House, a title also earned by his father José Agostinho Estácio da Veiga.

In 1933 Lisbon's City Hall paid homage to the writer and archaeologist by giving his name to a street in Penha de França, a civil parish of the city.

== Works ==
- Gibraltar e Olivença, Apontamentos para a História da Usurpação Desta Duas Praças, (1863)
- Plantas da Serra de Monchique Observadas Nesse Ano, (1866)
- Os Povos Balsenses, Sua Situação Geográfica e Física, Indicada por dois Monumentos Romanos Descobertos em Tavira, (1866)
- Romanceiro do Algarve, (1870)
- A Tábula de Bronze de Aljustrel, (1876)
- Antiguidades de Mafra, (1879)
- Memórias das Antiguidades de Mértola, (1877)
- Carta Arqueológica do Algarve, (1878)
- Ode a Luís de Camões em 10 de Junho de 1880, (1880)
- Projecto de Legenda Simbólica para a Elaboração e Interpretação da Carta de Arqueologia Histórica do Algarve, (1885)
- As Orquídeas de Portugal, (1886)
- As Antiguidades Monumentais do Algarve, (1886-1891, four volumes)
- Programa para a Instituição dos Estudos Arqueológicos em Portugal, (1891)
