= Viscount of Balsemão =

Noble title

Viscountship Balsemão
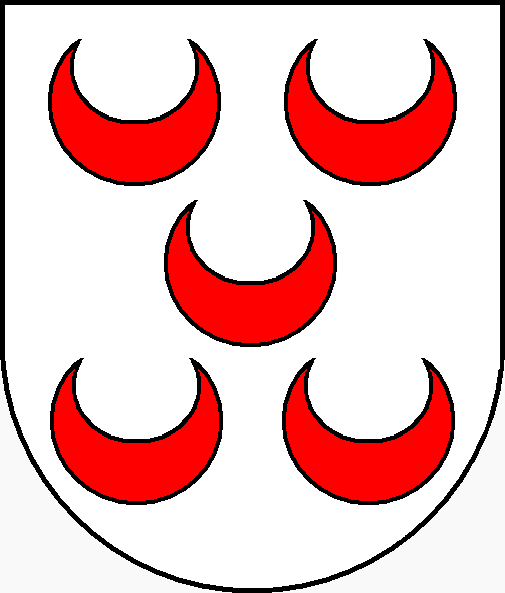
- Creation date: 14 August 1801
- Created by: Prince Regent Dom João in the name of Maria I of Portugal
- First holder: Luís Pinto de Sousa Coutinho, 1st Viscount of Balsemão
- Last holder: Luis Alexandre Alfredo Pinto de Sousa Coutinho, 5th Viscount of Balsemão (Monarchy abolished); Luís Maria Perestrelo Pinto de Sousa Coutinho (Claimant)
- Extinction date: 1910 (Monarchy abolished)
- Seat: Palacete of the Viscounts of Balsemão

The noble title of Viscount of Balsemão, granted in perpetuity and with Honours of Grandeeship, was created by the Prince Regent, Dom João, in the name of his mother, Queen Maria I of Portugal, by Decree of 14 August 1801, in favour of Luís Pinto de Sousa Coutinho.

== History ==
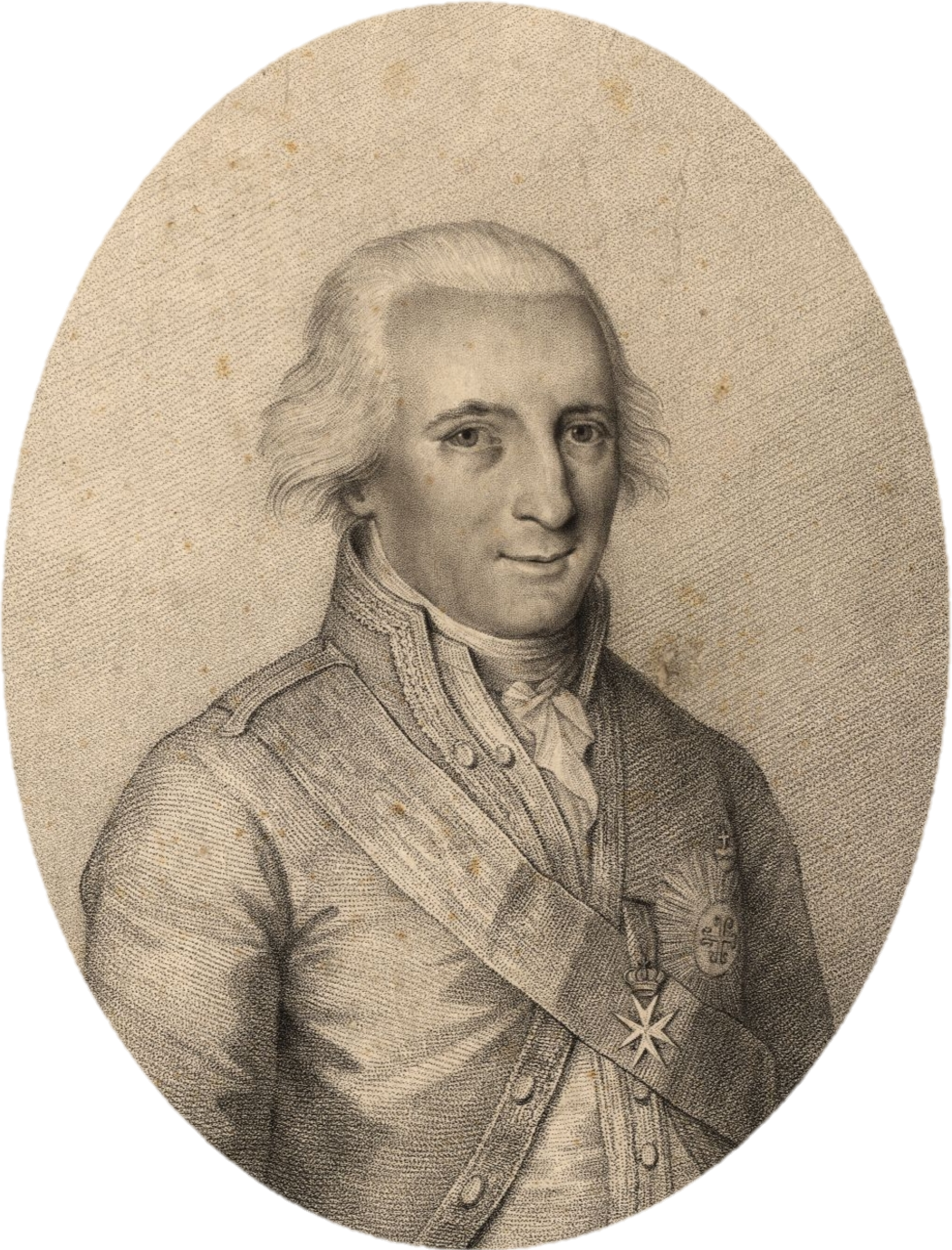
Luís Pinto de Sousa Coutinho, 1st Viscount of Balsemão (1797)

As Viscounts with Grandeeship, the Viscounts of Balsemão are entitled to bear the heraldic coronet of a Count.

The Palacete of the Viscounts of Balsemão, commissioned in the mid-18th century by the nobleman José Brandão Godinho Perestrello Pereira de Azevedo, came into the possession of the Balsemão family through the marriage of his daughter to her cousin, Luís Máximo Alfredo Pinto de Sousa Coutinho, the second Viscount of Balsemão.

== Viscounts of Balsemão (1801) ==
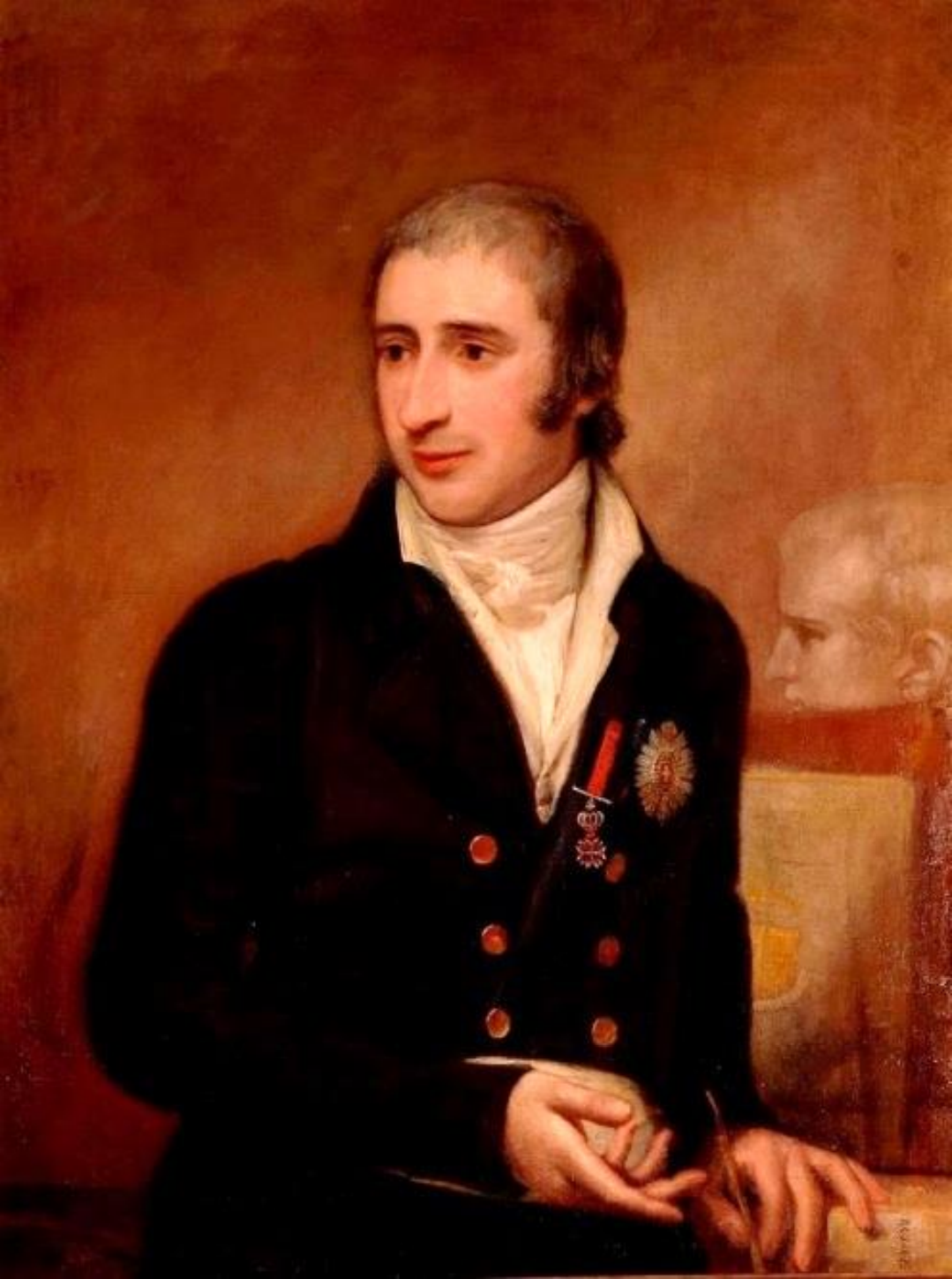
Luís Máximo Alfredo Pinto de Sousa Coutinho, 2nd Viscount of Balsemão

#	Name	Dates	Title	Notes
1	Luis Pinto de Sousa Coutinho	1735—1804	1st Viscount of Balsemão	Created Viscount by Royal Decree
2	Luis Máximo Alfredo Pinto de Sousa Coutinho	1774—1832	2nd Viscount of Balsemão	Son of the 1st Viscount of Balsemão
3	Luis José Alexandre Pinto de Sousa Coutinho	1800—1852	3rd Viscount of Balsemão	Son of the 2nd Viscount of Balsemão; Died without issue
4	Vasco Pinto de Sousa Coutinho	1802—1862	4th Viscount of Balsemão	Son of the 2nd Viscount of Balsemão; Brother of the 3rd Viscount of Balsemão
5	Luis Alexandre Alfredo Pinto de Sousa Coutinho	1839—1919	5th Viscount of Balsemão	Son of the 4th Viscount of Balsemão

== Claimants post-Monarchy ==
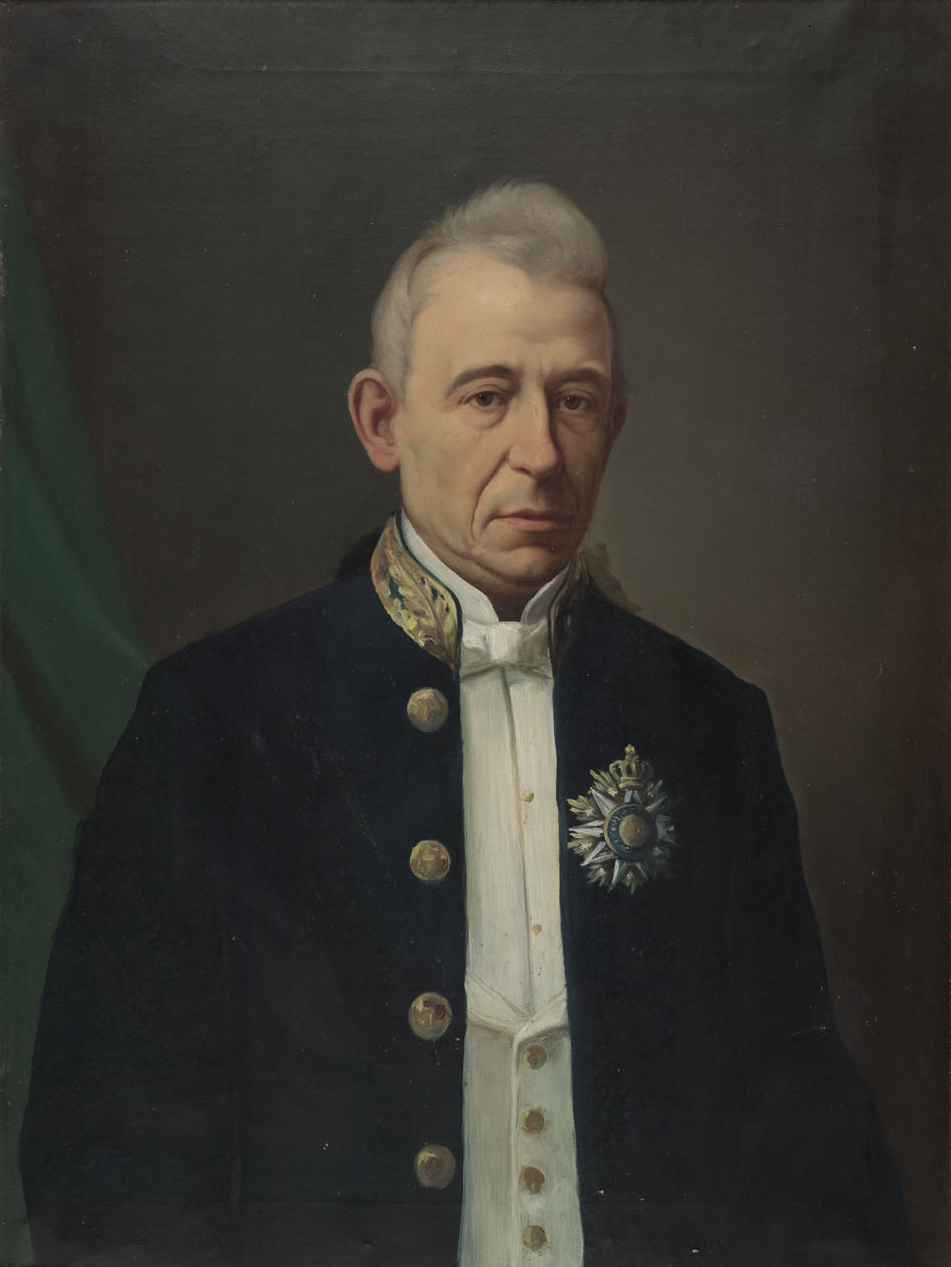
Vasco Pinto de Sousa Coutinho, 4th Viscount of Balsemão (1860)

#	Name	Dates	Title	Notes
6	Vasco Pinto de Sousa Coutinho	1868—1931	6th Viscount of Balsemão	Son of the 5th Viscount of Balsemão
7	Luis Maria Perestrelo Pinto de Sousa Coutinho	1915—1976	7th Viscount of Balsemão	Son of the 6th Viscount of Balsemão
8	Vasco Pinto de Sousa Coutinho	b. 1943	8th Viscount of Balsemão	Current claimant

== Notes ==
- This article was originally translated, in whole or in part, from the Portuguese Wikipedia article titled "Visconde de Balsemão".
