= List of Portuguese films of 2014 =

The Portuguese film industry produced over thirty feature films in 2014. This article exhaustively lists all non-pornographic films, including short films, that had a release date in that year and were at least partly made in Portugal. It does not include films first released in previous years that had release dates in 2014.
Also included is an overview of the major events in Portuguese film, including film festivals and awards ceremonies, as well as lists of those films that have been particularly well received, both critically and financially.

== Major releases ==
Opening		Title	Cast and Crew	Studio	Genre(s)	Ref.
A P R I L	13	Sei Lá	Director: Joaquim Leitão; Cast: Leonor Seixas, Rita Pereira, Pedro Granger, Rui Unas, Tino Navarro, António Pedro Cerdeira, Paula Lobo Antunes		Romance; Comedy	
M A Y	1	Getúlio	Director: João Jardim; Cast: Alexandre Borges, Tony Ramos, Leonardo Medeiros, Fernando Luís, Drica Moraes	Europa Filmes	Biography; Drama	
M A Y	26	Bridges of Sarajevo	Directors: Aida Begić, Leonardo Di Constanzo, Jean-Luc Godard, Kamen Kalev, Isild Le Besco, Sergei Loznitsa, Vincenzo Marra, Ursula Meier, Vladimir Perišić, Cristi Puiu, Marc Recha, Angela Schanelec, Teresa Villaverde		Documentary	
A U G U S T	13	Horse Money	Director: Pedro Costa		Drama	
S E P T E M B E R	27	Os Gatos Não Têm Vertigens	Director: António-Pedro Vasconcelos; Cast: Maria do Céu Guerra, João Jesus, Nicolau Breyner, Fernanda Serrano	NOS Audiovisuais	Comedy; Drama	
O C T O B E R	30	Mau Mau Maria	Director: José Alberto Pinheiro	NOS Lusomundo Audiovisuais	Comedy	
N O V E M B E R	27	Virados do Avesso	Director: Edgar Pêra; Cast: Diogo Morgado, Nicolau Breyner, Rui Unas	NOS Lusomundo Audiovisuais	Comedy	

== See also ==
- 2014 in film
- 2014 in Portugal
- Cinema of Portugal
- List of Portuguese submissions for the Academy Award for Best Foreign Language Film
