= 2015 in Portugal =

- Decades: 1990s; 2000s; 2010s; 2020s; 2030s
- See also: History of Portugal; Timeline of Portuguese history; List of years in Portugal

The following lists events in the year 2015 in Portugal.

== Incumbents ==
- President: Aníbal Cavaco Silva
- Prime Minister: Pedro Passos Coelho (Social Democratic) (until 26 November); António Costa (Socialist) (from 26 November)

== Events ==
=== January to March ===
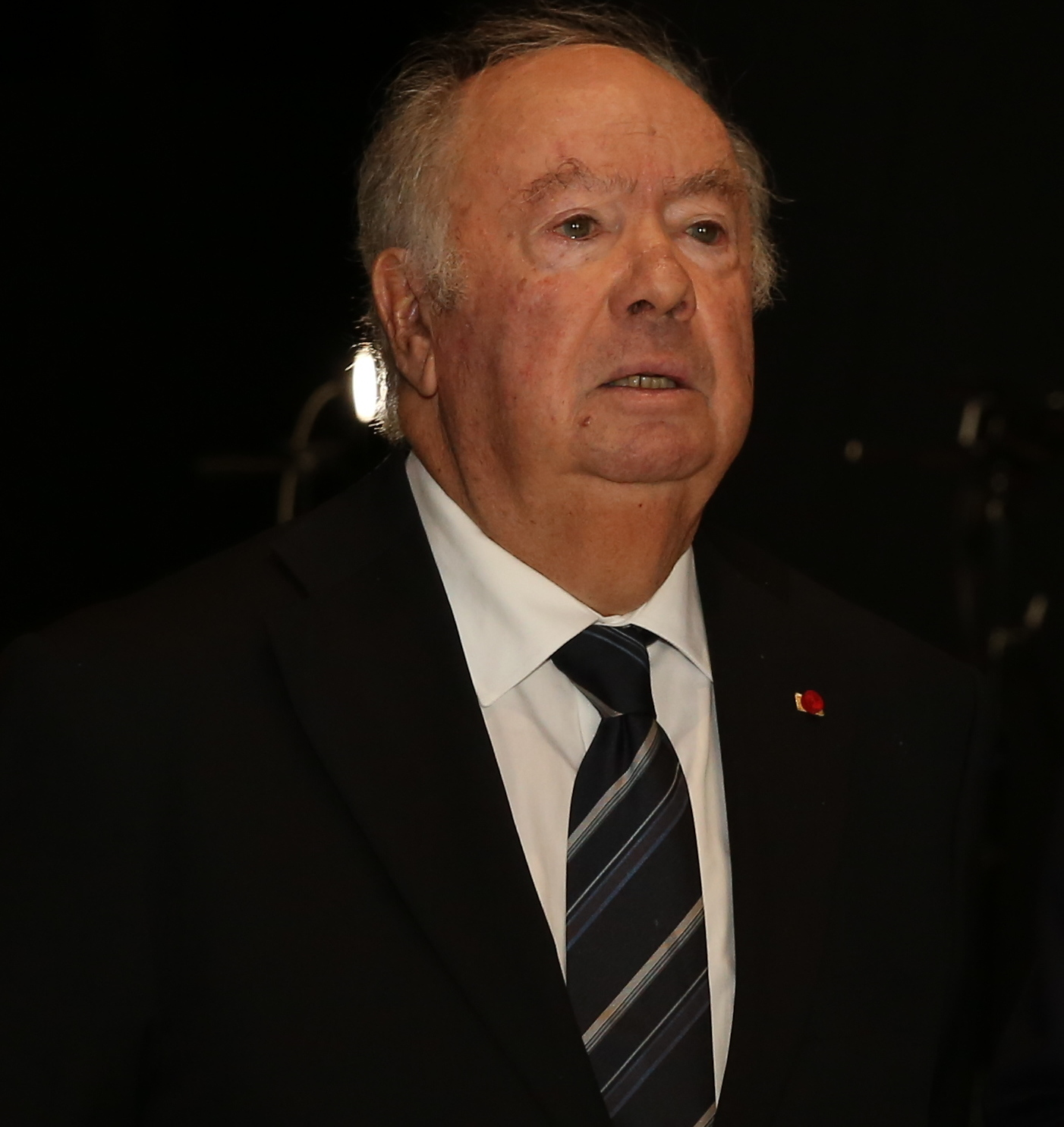
12 January: Alberto João Jardim (pictured in 2013) resigns as President of the Regional Government of Madeira, a post he has held continuously since March 1978.

- 12 January – Alberto João Jardim steps down as the President of the Regional Government of Madeira after holding the position for 37 years, the longest spell of any incumbent politician in Portugal. He is replaced by Miguel Albuquerque, who was elected as Jardim's successor as the leader of the Madeiran Social Democratic Party in December 2014, and who had earlier committed to holding early elections to the Legislative Assembly of Madeira upon taking up the post.
- 29 January – The government announces that the descendents of Sephardic Jews who were expelled, killed, or suffered forced conversion to Christianity at the end of the 15th century will be able to apply for Portuguese citizenship.
- 27 February – Data from the Instituto Nacional de Estatística reveals that the national economy grew by 0.9% in 2014, marking the country's first full-year of economic expansion since 2010. The forecast shows further expected growth of 1.5% for 2015.
- 28 February – An opinion poll by company Eurosondagem places the governing Portugal à Frente coalition of the Social Democratic Party (PSD) and the CDS – People's Party (CDS–PP) within three percentage points of the opposition Socialist Party ahead of the scheduled autumn general election. The poll forecasts each to win approximately 100 seats in the Assembly.
- 18 March – The head of the tax revenue service Antonio Brigas Afonso resigns following claims his office attempted to hide the tax records of top officials, including Prime Minister Pedro Passos Coelho, from investigators.
- 24 March – Palaeontologists announce that the fossils of a 220-million year old carnivorous amphibian found in the Algarve constitute a new species, named Metoposaurus algarvensis. The species is thought to have been one of the top predators in the late Triassic.
- 29 March – Madeiran regional election: The PSD led by Miguel Albuquerque retains its majority in the Madeiran Assembly with 44.4% of the vote, taking 24 of the 47 available seats. The CDS–PP finishes as the second largest party with seven seats, one more than the left-wing Mudança coalition of the Socialist Party, the Portuguese Workers' Party, People Animals Nature, and The Earth Party Movement, which finishes in third with six seats.

=== April to June ===
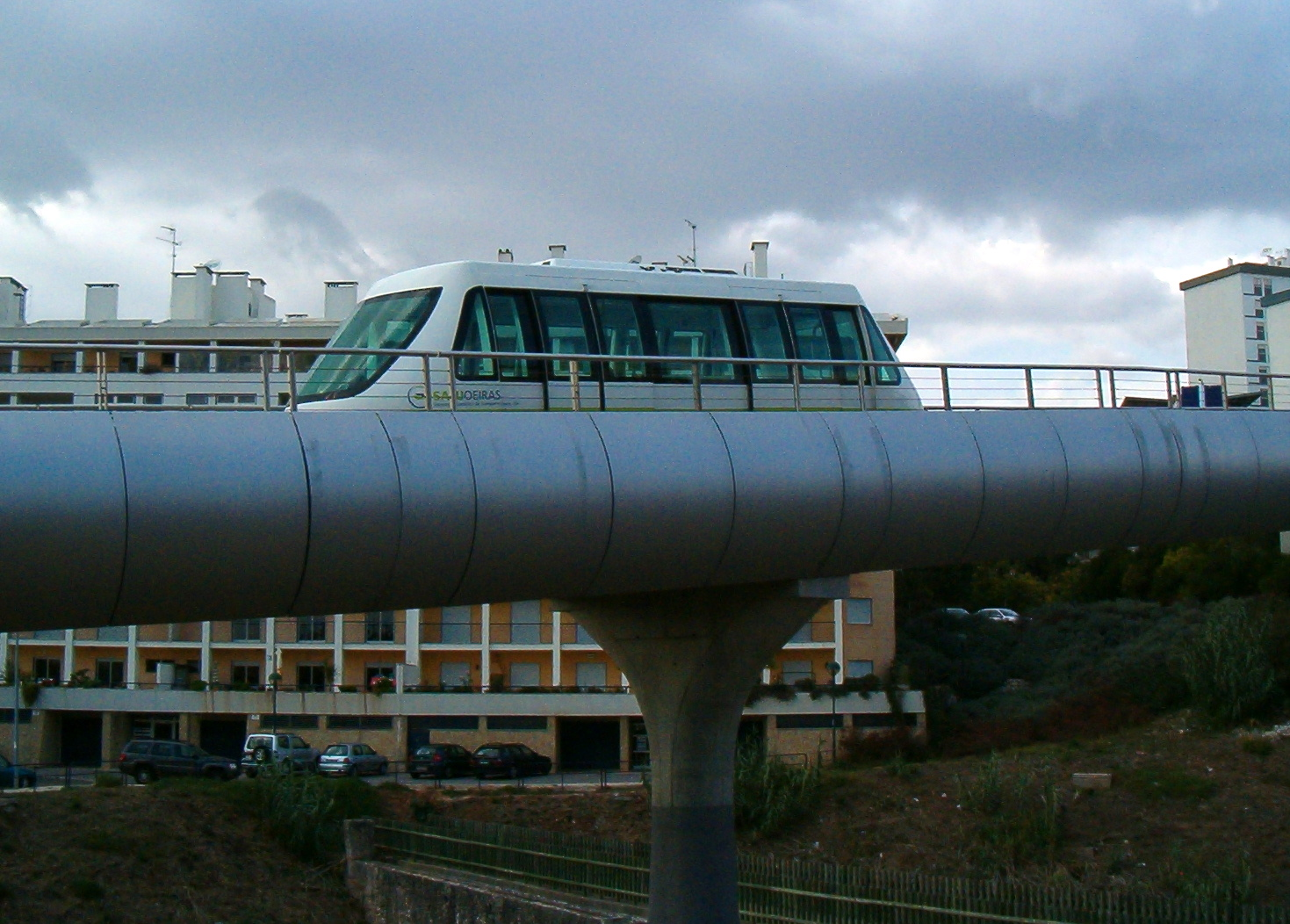
31 May: SATUOeiras, the first unmanned urban rail service in Portugal, closes after eleven years (vehicle pictured in 2008)

- 17 May – In association football, S.L. Benfica win the 2014–15 Primeira Liga following a 0–0 draw against Vitória Guimarães, securing an unassailable points lead ahead of title rivals F.C. Porto with one game of the season left to play. It is the first time the club has won back-to-back league championships in more than three decades.
- 24 May – In motor racing, Finland's Jari-Matti Latvala wins the 2015 Rally de Portugal.
- 31 May – The SATUOeiras unmanned light rail service in the city of Oeiras, the first of its kind in the country, is terminated after eleven years of operation due to rising debts of €40 million and uncertainties over its long-term future.
- 11 June – The government sells its controlling stake in the national flag carrier TAP Air Portugal to a consortium headed by Brazilian-American businessman David Neeleman for €10 million. The sale is met with a mixed response: Prime Minister Pedro Passos Coelho praises the end a process attempted by governments for almost two decades, while the Socialist Party announces its intention to re-nationalise the airline upon victory in autumn's general election.
- 12–28 June – Portugal contests the inaugural European Games in Baku with a delegation of 100 athletes competing in 14 sports. Portuguese athletes win a total of 10 medals, with the nation's three gold medals achieved by Telma Monteiro in judo, Rui Bragança in taekwando, and Marcos Freitas, Tiago Apolónia and João Geraldo in the men's table tennis competition.

=== July to September ===
- 23 July – MPs approve plans to strengthen anti-abortion laws, which include the introduction of fees and mandatory counselling sessions for those wishing to end pregnancies early.
- 9 August – In cycling, Spain's Gustavo Veloso wins the 2015 Volta a Portugal in a time of 40 hours and 39 seconds. It is Veloso's second consecutive win in the event.
- 3 September – Following months of below-average rainfall, a report by the Portuguese Institute for Sea and Atmosphere states that the country is suffering its second worst drought in 70 years, with almost three-quarters of the country experiencing severe or extreme drought conditions.

=== October to December ===
- 4 October – General election:
  - The Portugal à Frente coalition of the PSD and CDS–PP parties under Prime Minister Pedro Passos Coelho finishes as the largest group in the Assembly with 107 seats and 36.8% of the vote, but falls short of securing an absolute majority. The Socialist Party wins 86 seats, a gain of 12 from the last election, while the Left Bloc doubles its vote share from 2011 to end as the Assembly's third-largest party with 19 seats. Turnout falls to 56%, the lowest recorded in a legislative election since the Carnation Revolution.
  - Socialist Party leader António Costa declares he will not resign from his post despite his party's results falling below pre-election expectations.
- 22 October – President Aníbal Cavaco Silva invites Pedro Passos Coelho to continue on as Prime Minister of a minority government, citing a 40–year precedent that the leader of the Assembly's largest party is asked to take office. António Costa subsequently announces that Passos Coelho's re-appointment will be met with a parliamentary vote of no confidence in his administration.
- 2 November – Heavy rainfall of up 15 centimetres (5.9 in) in 24 hours causes flash floods in Albufeira and the wider Algarve region, killing one person.
- 10 November – MPs approve a vote of no confidence in the government of Prime Minister Passos Coelho following an agreement between members of the Socialist Party, the Communist Party, and the Left Bloc. At just 11 days Passos Coelho's administration becomes the shortest-lived government in Portuguese history.
- 24 November – António Costa is appointed as the new prime minister by President Cavaco Silva as head of a four-party coalition between the Socialist Party, the Left Bloc, the Communist Party, and the Green Party. Costa is formally sworn into office two days later, and agrees to abide by a series of six conditions set out by the President, which include following eurozone budget regulations and maintaining Portugal's international responsibilities as a member of NATO.

== Deaths ==
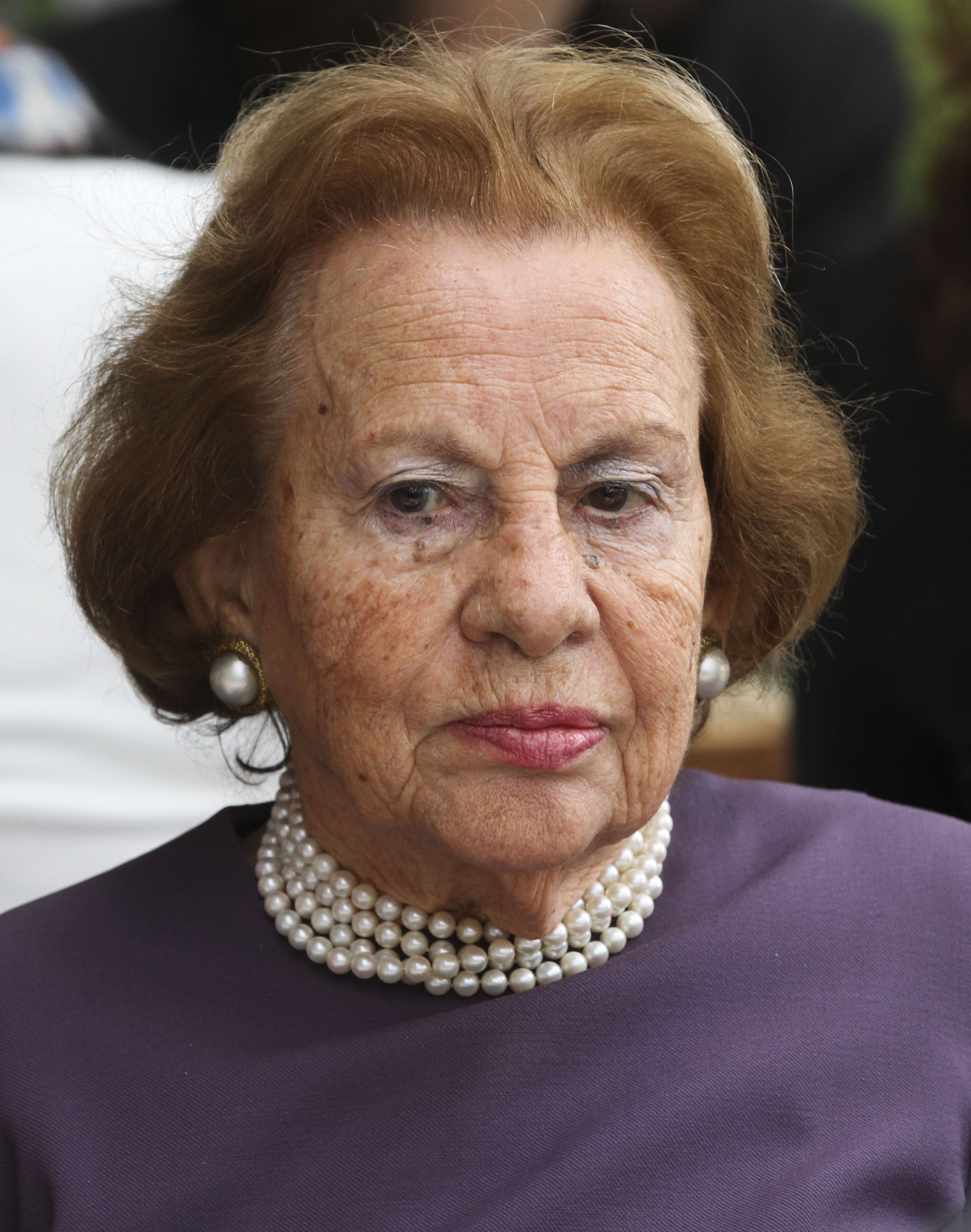
Maria Barroso in 2013

- 15 February – Luísa Dacosta, writer (born 1927).
- 23 March – Herberto Hélder, poet (born 1930).
- 26 March – Luís Miguel Rocha, author (born 1976).
- 2 April – Manoel de Oliveira, film director and screenwriter (born 1908).
- 7 July – Maria Barroso, actress and First Lady of Portugal (1986–1996) (born 1925).
- 5 August – Ana Hatherly, writer and artist (born 1929).
- 1 November – José Fonseca e Costa, film director (born 1933).
- 7 November – Pancho Guedes, architect (born 1925).

== See also ==
- List of Portuguese films of 2015
