= António Tavares =

António Tavares may refer to:

- António Tavares (sport shooter)
- António Tavares (writer)
- Antonio Tavares (footballer)
