= List of Portuguese films of 2015 =

A list of Portuguese films that were first released in 2015.

== Highest-grossing films ==
The following is a list of the 10 highest-grossing domestic films in Portugal that were first released in 2015, as of December 16, 2015, according to the Instituto do Cinema e do Audiovisual.

Rank	Title	Gross
1	O Pátio das Cantigas	€3,096,643
2	O Leão da Estrela	€634,284
3	Capitão Falcão	€129,685
4	As Mil e Uma Noites: Volume 1, O Inquieto	€95,199
5	Vontade de Vencer	€65,657
6	As Mil e Uma Noites: Volume 2, O Desolado	€43,954
7	As Mil e Uma Noites: Volume 3, O Encantado	€22,448
8	Pára-me de Repente o Pensamento	€24,909
9	Montanha	€19,427
10	Yvone Kane	€10,217

== List of films ==
Release date	Title	Director	Cast	Genre	Notes	Ref
	Arabian Nights	Miguel Gomes		Drama		
January	Crime	Rui Filipe Torres				
April 23	Capitão Falcão	João Leitão	Gonçalo Waddington, David Chan, José Pinto	Action, adventure		
May 4	Visit or Memories and Confessions	Manoel de Oliveira	Manoel de Oliveira, Maria Oliveira, Urbano Tavares Rodrigues	Documentary		
	Carlos do Carmo - Um homem no mundo			Documentary		
	O Ornitólogo	João Pedro Rodrigues				

== See also ==
- 2015 in Portugal
