= Jarê =

African-origin religious practice in Bahia, Brazil

Jarê is a religious practice of African origin found exclusively in the Chapada Diamantina region, in the central region of the Brazilian state of Bahia, especially among the descendants of Africans from the Lençóis region.

It is often characterized as a less orthodox branch of Candomblé, forming an amalgam resulting from a fusion process that involves elements of the Bantu and Nagô cults, to which are added aspects of rural Catholicism, Umbanda and Kardecist spiritism.

== Etymology ==
Jarê is probably a term of Yoruba origin meaning “almost falling to the ground” or “cutting through”. Another possibility is that it is a corruption of “njale”, a word that referred to a ceremony performed by the inhabitants of present-day Nigeria and Benin. The term jarê is used both to designate religion in general and to refer to its various ritualistic occasions.

== Emergence and development ==
At least in terms of evidence, it can be said that it emerged and consolidated in the interior of Bahia, specifically in the towns of Lençóis and Andaraí in the Chapada Diamantina region, in the mid-19th century. Its emergence is linked to the development of mining in this region, which was marked by a considerable influx of slave labor, an element that was compounded by the presence of Africans since the end of the 18th century in what is now the town of Andaraí, which at the time was a quilombo. From these towns, jarê spread to nearby areas that didn't have diamonds and were marked by peasant agriculture. This process of expansion led to changes in the way the cult was performed. As a result, it can be seen that the jarê in mining areas, performed by the mining population with origins marked by slavery, favored practices of worshipping entities that referred to African ancestry. On the other hand, its expansion into non-mining areas shows practices more closely linked to popular Catholicism, with an emphasis on healing rituals.

Reconstructing the history of the Nagôs and the emergence of the jarê depends largely on oral history accounts, since this religion of African origin was often confronted by the powers that be, suffering brutal police persecution and curtailment by the Catholic Church. It is not possible to guarantee that the current decline in the number of Jarê houses of worship is due to these factors, notwithstanding the socio-economic transformations that the region has undergone and which have affected many of its spheres. However, it is undeniable that in the fairly recent past the houses of worship at the headquarters of a single town like Lençóis could be counted in their dozens, while today there must be less than half that number, several of them buildings a few kilometers away from the town center. Despite all the difficulties encountered in keeping this religion alive, it is still possible to identify numerous jarê terreiros in the Chapada Diamantina, and it is possible to see that many followers continue to practice it.

== Characteristics ==
A religious practice developed mainly by enslaved and freed people - from the towns of Cachoeira and São Félix, both in the state of Bahia - who were brought to the Chapada Diamantina region as a result of mining activities, settling in towns such as Lençóis and Andaraí between the 18th and 19th centuries. This is where the so-called jarê de nagô cult began, in which the orixás, African deities, were worshipped exclusively. However, given the coexistence with descendants of indigenous people who inhabited the region, little by little certain entities representing indigenous culture were incorporated into the jarê, outlining its current form, which is therefore marked by Afro-indigenous cultural dialogues. In this circuit, it is a religious practice marked by the syncretism of different cultural elements, including aspects of African cults, Catholicism and Kardecist spiritism. Jarê is a term that covers a large number of beliefs, cults and rituals with diverse characteristics, developed according to the needs and convenience of the practitioners.

=== Ceremonies ===
In general, the ritual procedures are known by large segments of the population and the festivities are attended by adults, young people and children. The duration of the ceremonies varies, but it is unusual for them to last less than five hours or more than ten hours in a row on the same day. They can last for more than a day, but at present it is not common for them to last for more than three consecutive days. In celebrations, people who are sensitive to receiving entities can receive (incorporate) several entities, so in a celebration with a large number of participants it is possible for up to a hundred different incorporations to take place.

=== Trabalhos and revistas ===
Trabalhos and revistas are the main activities carried out in a jarê terreiro.

A revista ("review") is a private consultation in which the curador/pai-de santo ("healer") with his incorporated caboclo, identifies the nature and causes of the problem experienced by the patient and then proposes a treatment. It should be emphasized that a problem is not necessarily a physical illness, but in broader terms it also corresponds to a perceived state of distress. In Jarê cosmology, human beings interact with people, spirits and things over which they have no control and know very little, and are therefore in a constant state of vulnerability (corpo aberto). From this perspective, the illnesses and ailments that afflict people are seen as the result of the relationships they establish both with other people and with supernatural entities. The review is when the patient's trajectory is reviewed and aims to identify the causes of the problem that was generated by the web of relationships in which the patient is entangled, so healing corresponds to a redefinition of the context of interrelationships in which the patient is inscribed. Strengthening the patient is a kind of fechar de corpo ("closing of the body") that seeks to ensure a less vulnerable position in relation to the world and others. In addition to the possibility of treating an illness, the healer's main concern is to identify and characterize the conflicting relationships in which the patient is entangled, so the patient's narratives are essential in the review process in which he waits for the caboclo, through the healer, to specify what actions and events have led him to the situation in which he finds himself. From this perspective, the therapeutic meaning of the review is given.

The trabalho ("work"), on the other hand, is a healing ritual prescribed for one or more pacientes/clientes ("patient/client"), open to anyone who wants to witness it. It takes place at night and continues until dawn the next day. The trabalhos are festive gatherings attended by regular members of the terreiro as well as spectators who come to see the jarê.

=== Pai-de-santo/Curador ===
The highest authority in the jarê is concentrated in the hands of the pai or mãe-de-santo, more popularly known as curadores, and it is worth noting that women rarely reach this position. It is believed that the caboclos force the individual to become a curador, causing them a series of misfortunes until they decide to accept their destiny. Thus, the career of curador is not seen as a choice, but as an obligation from which the individual cannot extricate himself. Healers are seen as mediators between the world of human beings and that of spirits, being possessed by entities to perform their therapeutic role. Their career begins when they start showing behavioral changes interpreted as signs of interference from the caboclos. By consulting a healer, the presence of spirits who demand that he become a healer himself can be confirmed. By accepting what is presented as a destiny (becoming a healer) your own problems will be solved. Refusing means prolonging the problems that brought you to the healer in the first place. On deciding to become a healer, the individual will undergo a healing ceremony and the seating of their guides, in which the pai-de-santo will grant them the authority to also exercise the function of jarê healer. From this perspective, becoming a healer is something pre-destined, it is assumed that the powers are granted to the healer, thus, in this conception, the pai-de-santo/healer does not need to go through a long process of formal apprenticeship between master and disciple, his condition of becoming a healer and carrying out his functions does not find shelter in the idea of progressive accumulation of knowledge - esoteric, magical, therapeutic - but rather in a destiny that has been imposed on him by superior forces that will lead him.

=== Organization ===
Functions, rights and duties are distributed among the few individuals in the terreiro. The curador and his assistant are responsible for most of the terreiro's maintenance activities, and there is practically no bureaucratization. The Jarê cult presupposes a considerable margin of freedom of initiative and action, so it doesn't constitute a group with a complex internal organization, nor is it delimited by codes of conduct or a fixed and stable structure. This does not correspond to fragmentation and individualization, but rather to traits of an “open” religious practice, marked by the fluidity of beliefs and actions as a result of the specific socio-cultural experience of its participants.

== Jarê in Brazilian literature ==
References to the Jarê are found in the novel Crooked Plow, by Itamar Vieira Junior. Zeca Chapéu Grande, the narrators' father, works as a Jarê curador in his community and is sought out to cure ailments of the body and spirit with prayers and roots.

== See also ==
- Umbanda
- Candomblé
- Tambor de Mina
- Quimbanda
