= João Paulo Borges Coelho =

Mozambican historian and writer

João Paulo Borges Coelho (born in Porto, Portugal in 1955) is a Mozambican historian and writer. He studied history in Maputo and was awarded a PhD in economic and social history from the University of Bradford. He is professor of contemporary history at the Eduardo Mondlane University, Maputo, and editor of Arquivo, the journal of the Mozambican National Archive in Maputo, a specialist in military history and has acted as an academic adviser to the Mozambican Ministry of Defence. He is also a writer; in 2009 he won the LEYA Novel Prize.

== Further sources ==
- Curriculum Vitae:
- Article on JPBC:
- Bibliography:
- Interview with JPBC in Expresso África (Lisbon), 2006-04-12
