= List of Portuguese films of 2013 =

A list of Portuguese films that were first released in 2013.

Release date	Title	Director	Cast	Genre	Notes	Ref
February 28	Quarta Divisão	Joaquim Leitão		Drama		
March 14	A Última Vez Que Vi Macau	João Pedro Rodrigues, João Rui Guerra da Mata		Documentary, musical, drama	Co-production	
March 21	Night Train to Lisbon	Bille August		Romance, thriller	Co-production	
April 25	É o Amor	João Canijo		Drama		
April 25	O Frágil Som do Meu Motor	Leonardo António		Thriller		
May 9	Além de Ti	João Marco		Romance, thriller, musical		
May 9	Beat Girl	Mairtín de Barra		Drama	Co-production	
May 16	A República Di Mininus	Flora Gomes		Drama	Co-production	
June 13	Ophiussa - Uma Cidade de Fernando Pessoa	Fernando Carrilho		Documentary, biographical		
June 20	Em Segunda Mão	Catarina Ruivo		Drama, thriller		
June 27	Bairro	Jorge Cardoso, Lourenço Mello, José Manuel Fernandes, Ricardo Inácio		Drama		
July 11	A Batalha de Tabatô	João Viana		Documentary, drama	Co-production	
August 29	Real Playing Game	Tino Navarro, David Rebordão		Science fiction, action, drama		
September 19	Insensíveis	Juan Carlos Medina		Fantasy, horror	Co-production	
November 7	Até Amanhã Camaradas	Joaquim Leitão		Biographical, drama		
November 7	Um Fim do Mundo	Pedro Pinho		Drama		
November 14	Collider	Jason Butler		Science fiction, drama	Co-production	
November 21	7 Pecados Rurais	Nicolau Breyner		Comedy		
November 21	Virgin Margarida	Licínio Azevedo		Drama	Co-production	
November 28	Terra De Ninguém	Salomé Lamas		Documentary, drama		

== See also ==
- 2013 in Portugal
