= Prémio Leya =

Portuguese literary award

Prémio LeYa
- Native name: Prémio LeYa
- Description: Literary prize
- Sponsored by: LeYa publishing group
- Country: Portugal
- Reward: €50.000
- First award: 2008

Highlights
- Total recipients: 14
- Website: https://www.leya.com/premio-leya

The Prémio Leya is a Portuguese literary award established in 2008 and awarded annually by the Portuguese book publishing company Leya to an unpublished Portuguese-language novel. The winner receives €50,000.

== Regulation ==
The LeYa Prize is open to any individual with full legal capacity, regardless of nationality. Submissions must be original, unpublished works of literary fiction in the novel category that have no pending decision from any other competition and must have aa minimum of 200.000 characters(including spaces). Entries are submitted in Word format through the LeYa website, signed with a pseudonym never previously used by the author, and accompanied by a synopsis of no more than 2,000 characters; the author’s identity is encrypted and known only to the jury at the time of the final decision.

A jury of prominent figures from the Portuguese language literary and cultural world evaluates the entries, based on reports prepared by a reading committee that may include editors from LeYa group. The jury deliberates independently by majority vote, with the president casting the deciding vote in case of a tie; its decision is final and cannot be appealed. As with previous editions, the jury may choose not to award the prize if it considers no submission to be of sufficient quality as happened in 2010, 2016 and 2019.

The winner receives a cash prize €100.000 in earlier editions, reduced to €50.000 for the 2026 edition along with publication of the work by LeYa or one of its publishing houses for distribution across Portuguese-speaking countries. In exchange, the winning author grants LeYa the exclusive worldwide right to commercially exploit the work in all forms, including translation and adaptation for stage, film, television or any media. The resulting publishing contract runs for 10 years and renews automatically unless terminated with cause. The prize can only be awarded once to the same author.

== Winners ==
- 2008: Murilo Antônio de Carvalho (Brazil), O Rastro do Jaguar.
- 2009: João Paulo Borges Coelho (Mozambique), O Olho de Hertzog.
- 2010: not assigned
- 2011: João Ricardo Pedro (Portugal), O teu rosto será o último.
- 2012: Nuno Camarneiro (Portugal), Debaixo de algum céu.
- 2013: Gabriela Ruivo Trindade, Uma Outra Voz.
- 2014: Afonso Reis Cabral (Portugal), O Meu Irmão.
- 2015: António Tavares (Portugal), O Coro dos Defuntos.
- 2016: not assigned
- 2017: João Pinto Coelho (Portugal), Os Loucos da Rua Mazur.
- 2018: Itamar Vieira Júnior (Brazil), Torto Arado.
- 2019: not assigned
- 2020: not assigned
- 2021: José Carlos Barros (Portugal), As Pessoas Invisíveis.
- 2022: Celso José da Costa (Brazil), A Arte de Driblar Destinos.
- 2023: Victor Vidal (Brazil), Não Há Pássaros Aqui.
- 2024: Nuno Duarte (Portugal), Pés de Barro.

Summaries of winning works:

2008: Jornalist Murilo Antônio de Carvalho tells the story of fellow jornalist Pereira and the indigenous Pierre in O Rasta do Jaguar (The Jaguar’s Trail), his debut novel. Set against the backdrop of the Paraguayan War, the two travel to France to revisit their memories and uncover their roots, triggering a culture clash that lays bare the relationship between European countries and their former colonies.

2009: O Olho de Hertzog (Hertzog’s Eye), narrated by historian João Paulo Borges Coelho, is set at the end of the Great War , where a German officer is tasked with joining a general’s contingent. Amid conflicts with the English and Portuguese armies, as well as diseases like malaria, the German becomes an enigmatic figure with a mysterious mission to fulfill.

2011: João Ricardo Pedro, his debut novel O Teu Rosto Sera o Ultimo (Your Face Will Be the Last) recounts episodes that are, in principle, independent of one another, set against the backdrop of the Carnation Revolution.

2012: Physicist and professor Nuno Camarneiro describes an apartment building near the beach where men, women, and children come looking for peace, music, or even a God. It’s ultimately a story about each persons search for redemption .

2013: The first woman to win the prize, Gabriela Ruivo Trindade, tells the intertwined stories of five women whose paths cross, culminating in a diary rediscovered many years later, In Uma Outra Voz (Another Voice), she builds a web of connection between the women, giving voice to multiple perspectives at once.

2014: The youngest winner to date, Afonso Reis Cabral, tells the story of the bond between two brothers, one of whom has a disability. Written with real feeling and a clear-eyes social lens, My brother took the prize in 2014.

2015: António Tavares Festas paints a picture of rural Portugal, where the villagers are cut off from the rest of the world’s advancements, oblivious to what’s happening beyond their own community. When television finally arrives, the characters in O Coro dos Defuntos (The Chrous of the Dead) gain a window into the wider world, but still can’t quite make sense of it.

2017: A blind bookseller who asks women to read to him in bed is the protagonist of The Madmen of Mazur Street. The story kicks off when João Pinto Coelho’s character gets a visit from a childhood friend now a famous writer from whom he was separated during World War ll

2018: The story of Bibiana and Belonísia, descendants of enslaved people, Torto Arado (Crooked Plow) became a landmark symbol against inequality still present in Brazil today. Itamar Vieira Junior’s novel has been translated into 15 languages.

2021: José Carlos Barros revisits one of the most tragic massacres in Portugals history p, examining the gap between slavery’s legal abolition and its actual end in practice, in As Pessoas invisíveis (The invisible People) .

2022: Celso José da Costa presents education as a path to freedom, gathering episodes where knowledge fuels the pursuit of a bigger dream. A Arte de Driblar Destinos (The Art of Outwitting Destinies) follows a boy encouraged by his teacher to study and become a teacher himself, so he can sidestep the future that seemed already mapped out for him.

2023:Não Há Pássaros Aqui (There Are No Birds Here) explores themes like the parent-child relationship and loneliness, as Vitor Vidal is drawn into digging up childhood hiding places and traumas deeply shaped by Anne Frank House.

2024: Nuno Miguel Silva Duarte won the prize for Pés de Barro(Feet of clay), which tells the story of the construction of Lisbon’s 25 de Abril Bridge, weaving together working-class life, coexistence with American workers in the Alcântara neighborhood, and the political turmoil of the era.

2025: A Sombra das Árvores no Inverno (The Shadow of the Trees in Winter), by Carla Pais interweaves the stories of several characters marked by violence ,exile and extreme events, portraying fractured families and the possibility of rebuilding. The novel was inspired by the author witnessing the 2015 refugee crisis and the way public opinion in France often painted refugees as terrorists.

== See also ==
• Prêmio Jabuti

• Camões Prize

• Nobel Prize in literature
