= Nuno Camarneiro =

Portuguese novelist

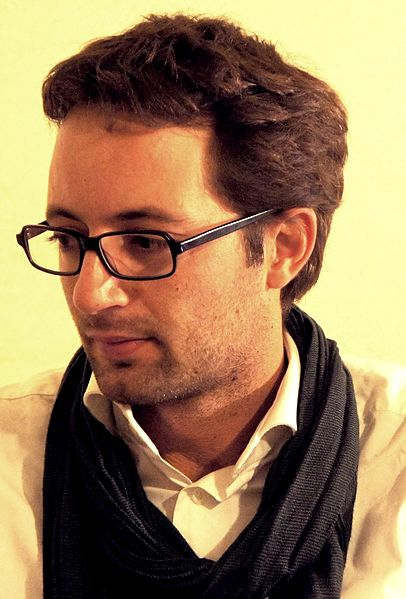
- Born: 17 August 1977 (age 49); Figueira da Foz, Portugal
- Occupation: Novelist
- Relatives: Rita Camarneiro (sister)
- Writing career
- Genre: Fiction

Nuno Camarneiro (born 17 August 1977) is a Portuguese novelist.

== Biography ==
Nuno Camarneiro was born in Figueira da Foz, Portugal, in 1977. He holds a degree in Physics Engineering by the University of Coimbra, worked at CERN and got his Ph.D. by the University of Florence. He teaches at the Portucalense University at Porto. In 2011 he published his first novel "No Meu Peito Não Cabem Pássaros" and, in 2013, "Debaixo de Algum Céu", which won the Prémio Leya.

== Works ==
- No Meu Peito Não Cabem Pássaros (Dom Quixote), Junho de 2011
- Debaixo de Algum Céu (LeYa), Abril 2013
