= 2013 in Portugal =

- Decades: 1990s; 2000s; 2010s; 2020s; 2030s
- See also: History of Portugal; Timeline of Portuguese history; List of years in Portugal

Events in the year 2013 in Portugal.

== Incumbents ==
- President: Aníbal Cavaco Silva
- Prime Minister: Pedro Passos Coelho (Social Democratic)

== Events ==
- 29 September - Local election

== Arts and entertainment ==
For Portuguese films first released in 2013, see List of Portuguese films of 2013. For music albums that reached number-one, see List of number-one albums of 2013 (Portugal).

- 25 February - Prémio Autores
- 6 October - Sophia Awards

== Sports ==
In association football, for the first-tier league seasons, see 2012–13 Primeira Liga and 2013–14 Primeira Liga; for the cup seasons, see 2012–13 Taça de Portugal and 2013–14 Taça de Portugal; for the league cup seasons, see 2012–13 Taça da Liga and 2013–14 Taça da Liga; for the second-tier league seasons, see 2012–13 Segunda Liga and 2013–14 Segunda Liga; for the third-tier league season, see 2013–14 Campeonato Nacional. See also 2012–13 Terceira Divisão. For transfers, see List of Portuguese football transfers summer 2013.

- 14–17 February - Volta ao Algarve
- 6–13 March - Algarve Cup
- 11–14 April - Rally de Portugal
- 28 April – 5 May - Portugal Open
- 26 May - Taça de Portugal Final
- 30 June - FIA WTCC Race of Portugal
- 19 July – 4 August - Portugal at the 2013 World Aquatics Championships
- 7–18 August - Volta a Portugal
- 10 August - Supertaça Cândido de Oliveira
- 10–18 August - Portugal at the 2013 World Championships in Athletics
- 22–29 September - Portugal at the 2013 UCI Road World Championships
- 16–28 October - Acrobatic Gymnastics European Championships
- Establishment of the Taça de Portugal de Futsal Feminino.

== See also ==
- List of Portuguese films of 2013
