= Rita Camarneiro =

Portuguese comedian and TV presenter

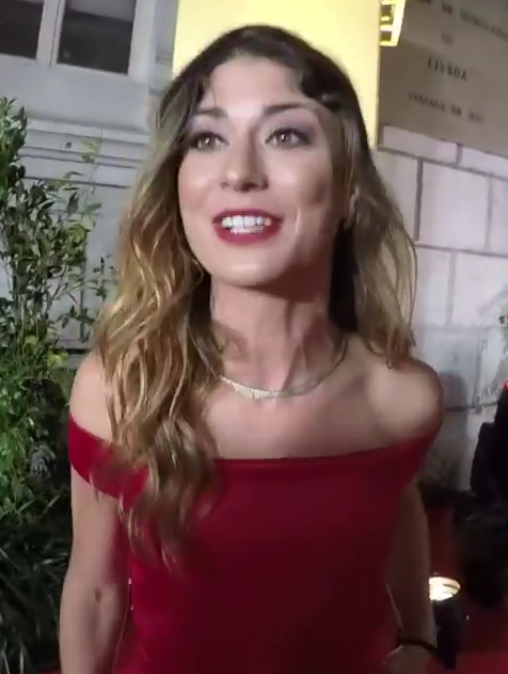
- Rita Camarneiro at the Portuguese Golden Globes in 2017
- Born: 15 January 1988 (age 38); Figueira da Foz, Portugal
- Occupations: TV presenter, psychologist
- Relatives: Nuno Camarneiro (brother)

Ana Rita Camarneiro Mendes (born 15 January 1988) is a Portuguese comedian and TV presenter.

== Career ==
She started her career in television at Rádio e Televisão de Portugal, the public service broadcasting organisation of Portugal. There, she did stand-up comedy and worked as a scriptwriter for late-night talk show 5 Para A Meia-Noite. She also wrote the television film Almas Penadas in 2012.

She played a role in Mau Mau Maria, a 2014 comedy film.

In late 2014, Camarneiro joined private broadcaster SIC Radical, where she became the new presenter of the CC All-Stars show.

In addition to her activities in television, Camarneiro has also worked for radio stations on several occasions. She currently co-hosts Antena 3's Prova oral up to five times per week.

== Personal life ==
Camarneiro is a native of Figueira da Foz, Coimbra District, in central Portugal. She has two older brothers, one of which is the novelist Nuno Camarneiro.

Before committing on her current career, she successfully completed a master's degree course in psychology at the University of Coimbra.
