= 2014 in Portugal =

- Decades: 1990s; 2000s; 2010s; 2020s; 2030s
- See also: History of Portugal; Timeline of Portuguese history; List of years in Portugal

The following lists events in the year 2014 in Portugal.

== Incumbents ==
- President: Aníbal Cavaco Silva
- Prime Minister: Pedro Passos Coelho (Social Democratic)

== Events ==
=== January ===
- 2 January – The government announces that Chinese conglomerate Fosun International will be the new majority owner of Caixa Seguros, the country's biggest insurance group, taking over from the public bank Caixa Geral de Depósitos. The sale comes as part of Portugal's obligations to divest state-owned companies under the bailout programme agreed with the European Union and the International Monetary Fund (IMF) in 2011.
- 5 January – The government declares three days of official mourning following the death of association football player Eusébio at the age of 71. The Mozambique-born footballer, who was awarded the Golden Boot as the highest-scoring player at the 1966 FIFA World Cup, was regarded as one of the sport's foremost and popular players in the 1960s.
- 31 January - The political party LIVRE is established.

=== February ===
- 4 February – Plans by the government to auction a series of 85 artworks by Spanish painter Joan Miró are cancelled by Christie's auction house following court action by critics of the proposed sale. The artworks, which came into possession of the Portuguese government following a buyout of Banco Português de Negócios in 2008, are estimated to be worth at least €36 million.

=== March ===
- 5 March – Palaeontologists from NOVA University Lisbon publish findings suggesting that Torvosaurus gurneyi, a 10-metre (33 ft) long dinosaur of the late Jurassic whose fossils were discovered in the Lourinhã Formation, constitutes the largest known European carnivore.

=== April ===
- 25 April – The 40th anniversary of the Carnation Revolution, which peacefully ended the Estado Novo authoritarian regime in 1974, is commemorated by both a series of celebratory events held across the country, and protests in Lisbon against the government's continuing austerity measures.

=== May ===
- 25 May - European Parliament election

=== September ===
- 28 September - Portuguese Socialist Party prime ministerial primary, 2014

=== November ===
- 9 November - Portugal reports to have 180 cases of Legionella with five deaths.
- 10 November - Isabel dos Santos, a billionaire and the eldest daughter of the President of Angola, has entered an auction for Portugal Telecom, bidding against a French-based company, Altice.
- 25 November - Portuguese police arrest the ex-prime minister of Portugal, José Socrates. They accuse him of corruption, fiscal fraud, and money laundering.

== Culture ==
- 8 May - 2014 Prémio Autores
- Portugal in the Eurovision Song Contest 2014

== Sports ==
In February, Portugal participated in the 2014 Winter Olympics. In association football, the first-tier league season, the 2013–14 Primeira Liga, ended on 11 May. For the second-tier league season, see 2013–14 Segunda Liga; for the third-tier league season, see 2013–14 Campeonato Nacional. The 2013–14 Taça da Liga ended on 26 April with the 2014 Taça da Liga Final. The 2014–15 Taça da Liga will begin on 26 July. The 2013–14 Taça de Portugal ended on 18 May with the 2014 Taça de Portugal Final.

- 5–12 March - Algarve Cup.
- 24 May - 2014 UEFA Champions League Final, at the Estádio da Luz in Lisbon.
- 30 July - 10 August - 2014 Volta a Portugal
- 16–28 August - Portugal at the 2014 Summer Youth Olympics
- 2014-15 Andebol 1
- Establishment of the Supertaça de Futsal Feminino de Portugal.

== Deaths ==
- 5 January – Eusébio, 71, footballer.
- 30 September - Victor Crespo, 81, politician, President of the Assembly of the Republic (1987–1991).

== See also ==
- List of Portuguese films of 2014
