= Crooked Plow =

2019 novel by Brazilian author Itamar Vieira Junior

- Author: Itamar Vieira Junior
- Original title: Torto Arado
- Translator: Johnny Lorenz
- Language: Portuguese
- Set in: Bahia, Brazil
- Publisher: Verso Fiction
- Publication date: 2019
- Publication place: Brazil
- English publication date: June 27, 2023
- Awards: 2018 Prêmio LeYa, 2020 Prêmio Jabuti, 2020 Prêmio Oceanos
- ISBN: 1839766409

Crooked Plow (Portuguese: Torto Arado) is a novel by Brazilian author Itamar Vieira Junior. It tells the story of two Afro-Brazilian sisters, Bibiana and Belonísia, who experience a life-altering tragedy in childhood. The sisters live as tenant farmers with their family in Chapada Diamantina in the Brazilian state of Bahia. The novel won numerous literary awards.

== Summary ==
=== Section I and II ===
The book's first sections are told through the eyes of the sisters, Bibiana and Belonísia. The story begins with the sisters sneaking into their grandmother's room and locating a knife beneath her bed, locked away in a suitcase. Tempted, they each put the mysterious knife in their mouths. One sister is unharmed, but the other cuts her tongue so severely that she is never able to speak again. The sisters become emotionally and mentally entwined as one must be a voice for the other. "That's how I became a part of Belonísia, just as she was becoming part of me...we felt like Siamese twins, sharing the same tongue to make the words that revealed what we needed to become." They grow up together in their parent's Afro-Brazilian sharecropping village in Bahia state, Brazil.

As childhood ends, a pregnant Bibiana secretly departs in the middle of the night with Severo, her boyfriend and cousin, a local union organizer. Together, they plan to fight deep-rooted injustices far from home. However, they shortly return to the homestead with their newborn baby and find that Belonísia has married an abusive drunk.

=== Section III ===
The last part of the book is told through the eyes of Santa Rita the fisherwoman, an African divinity who has been summoned by the sisters' father and channels the community's anger and strength.

Zeca Chapéu Grande, the sisters’ father, works as a Jarê curador in his community and is sought out to cure ailments of the body and spirit with prayers and roots.

== Background ==
On May 13, 1888, Princess Isabel, heir to the Brazilian throne, signed a "Golden Law" that freed 700,000 people from slavery in Brazil. Brazil had received almost half of enslaved Africans brought to the Americas by European colonizers. Although slavery had formally ended, the Portuguese Brazilian elites conspired to keep the infrastructure of slavery through tenant farming. In this system, formerly enslaved people were still at the mercy of landowners who would grant them permission to live on their property in exchange for free labor, leaving them indebted to their employers and without much more freedom than they had under slavery. Crooked Plow takes place in the second half of the 20th century, when they worked the land that they were, in practice, still prevented from owning.

The book’s success in Brazil exemplifies a trend in the country’s literary landscape toward novels told from the perspective of the historically oppressed. In the past five years, Vieira Junior has been an integral member of a group of Brazilian writers who, in depicting racism and slavery through the viewpoint of racial minorities and enslaved peoples, remind us of Brazil’s painful colonial history while returning agency to those who suffered under its one-sided narration. - Jimin Kang, The Nation

== The Author ==
The author, Itamar Vieira Junior (b. 1979) was born in Salvador, Bahia, Brazil. He received a Master's degree in Geography and a PhD in Ethnic and African studies from Universidade Federal da Bahia. His doctoral research focused on the ongoing struggles of quilombos, the Afro-Brazilian communities organized by escaped slaves and their descendants.

== Critical reception ==
The book received numerous positive reviews. Americas Quarterly stated the novel "captivated Brazil's literary scene" with a "tour de force of injustice, tragedy, affection and human dignity reminiscent of Victor Hugo's Les Misérables or John Steinbeck's The Grapes of Wrath". The Financial Times listed it as one of the Best Books of the year in 2023, "[Brazil's] deep-rooted racial and economic injustices are laid bare in one of the most celebrated Brazilian debut novels of recent times". Publishers Weekly wrote, "Vieira Junior conveys the girls' childhood confusion and wonder in hypnotic prose, and he brings the close-knit Água Negra to life. This heralds the arrival of a welcome voice."

The English translation, by Johnny Lorenz, also garnered positive acclaim as "gorgeous" and "skillful". In 2024 it was nominated for the International Booker Prize, which recognizes both literary merit and the masterfulness of the English translation.

== Awards and nominations ==
- 2018 – Prêmio LeYa
- 2020 – Prêmio Jabuti
- 2020 – Prêmio Oceanos
- 2024 – International Dublin Literary Award (Longlist)
- 2024 – Prix Montluc Rèsistance et Liberté
- 2024 – International Booker Prize (Shortlist)
