= Mau Mau Maria =

2014 film by José Alberto Pinheiro

- Film poster
- Directed by: José Alberto Pinheiro
- Written by: Marta Gomes; Marco Horácio
- Production companies: Creative Parlour; Marco Horácio Produções
- Distributed by: NOS Lusomundo Audiovisuais
- Release date: 30 October 2014
- Running time: 105 minutes
- Country: Portugal
- Language: Portuguese
- Box office: €267,410.29

Mau Mau Maria is a 2014 Portuguese comedy film directed by José Alberto Pinheiro. It was released on 30 October 2014.

== Cast ==
- Débora Monteiro
- Diana Chaves
- Inês Aires Pereira
- São José Correia
- Inês Castel-Branco
- Victor de Sousa
- José Pedro Gomes
- António Raminhos
- Eduardo Madeira
- Marco Horácio
- Margarida Moreira
- Rita Camarneiro
- Rui Reininho

== Reception ==
The film earned €267,410.29 at the Portuguese box office, and had 51,799 admissions. As of 11 January 2015, it was the 5th highest-grossing Portuguese film of 2014 at the Portuguese box office and, as of 14 January 2015, it was the 19th highest-grossing Portuguese film at the Portuguese box office since 2004.

On Público, Luís Miguel Oliveira gave the film a grade of "bad".
