= António Tavares (writer) =

Angolan writer and author

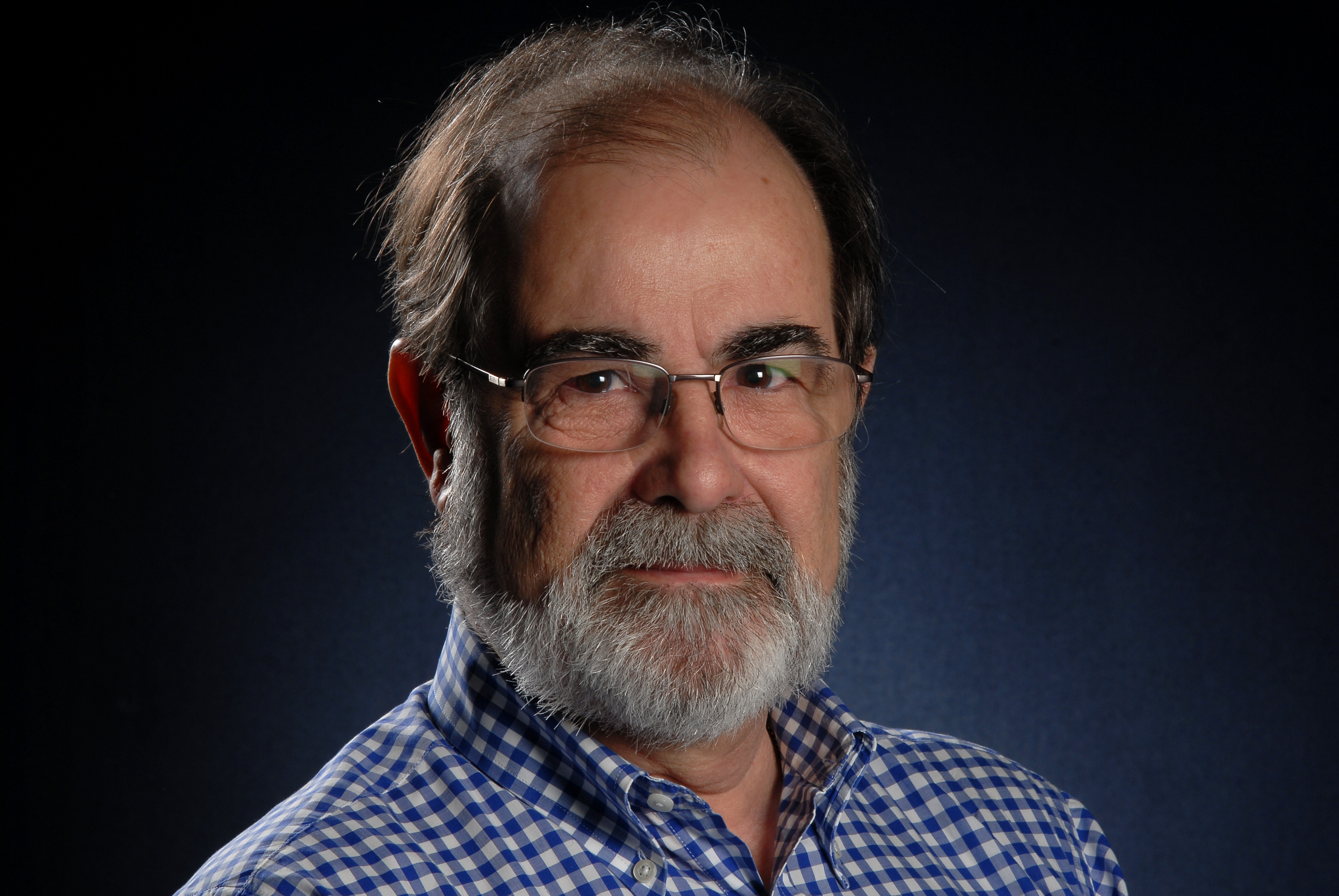
- 2009
- Born: António Tavares; 1960 (age 65–66); Lobito, Angola
- Education: University of Coimbra
- Occupation: Writer
- Years active: 1980–present

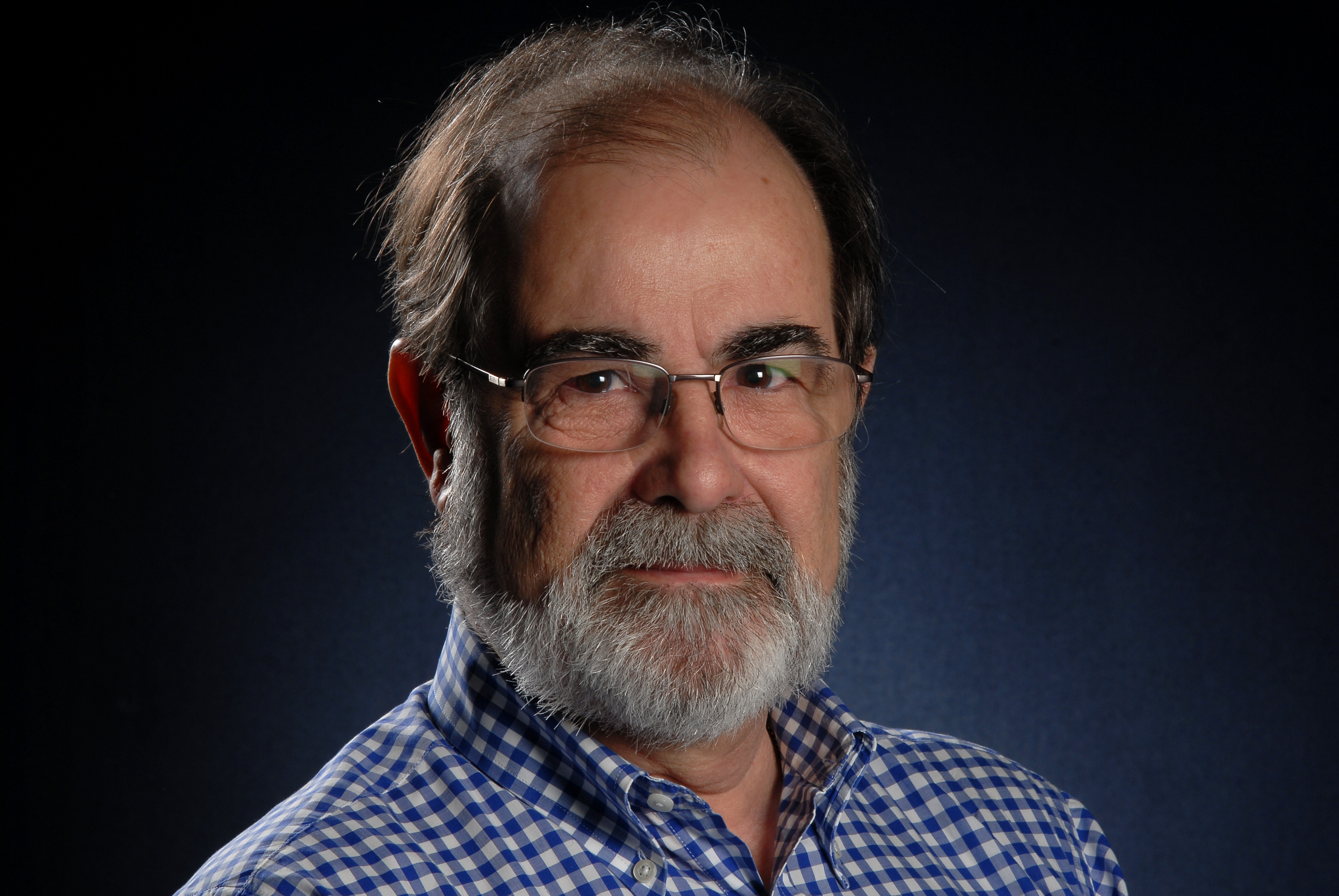
António Tavares

António Tavares (born 1960), is an Angolan–Portuguese author and writer. He is also a journalist, teacher and Portuguese politician.

== Personal life ==
He was born in 1960 in Lobito, Angola. In 1975 at the age of 15, he moved to Portugal following the process of decolonization in Africa. Then he attended high school in Porto. Later, he graduated in Law from the Faculty of Law of the University of Coimbra. He later obtained a post-graduate degree in Communication Law from the same university. After graduation, he started to work as a teacher in secondary education at High School Domingos Rebelo (Escola Secundária Domingos Rebelo), in Ponta Delgada, and later at Dr. Joaquim de Carvalho School (Escola Secundária Dr. Joaquim de Carvalho), in Figueira da Foz.

Meanwhile, he entered Portuguese politics and he became the mayor in the municipality of Figueira da Foz from 2005 to 2009 as a non-executive, and later as an executive in the areas of Culture, Urbanism and Environment from 2009 to 2013. From 2013 to 2017, Tavares is vice president of the municipality.

== Career ==
In 2013, he received an honorable mention in the Alves Redol Prize for the novel 'O Tempo Adormeceu sob o Sol da Tarde'. Tavares wrote the popular novel As Palavras que Me Deverão Guiar um Dia in which he was a finalist in the 2013 Leya Prize. However, in 2015 he won the Leya Award for the novel O Coro dos Defuntos (The Choir of the Dead). He also founded the regional newspaper 'A Linha do Oeste' and the magazine 'Litorais'.

== Author work ==
- Trilogia da Arte de Matar – (theater play)
- Gémeos 6 – (theater play)
- O Menino Rei – (theater play)
- Luís Cajão, O Homem e o Escritor
- Manuel Fernandes Thomás e a Liberdade de Imprensa
- Redondo Júnior e o Teatro
- Arquétipos e Mitos da Psicologia Social Figueirense
- Figueira da Foz, Erros do Passado, Soluções para o Futuro – (2013)
- As Palavras que Me Deverão Guiar um Dia – (2013)
- O Coro dos Defuntos – (2015)
- Todos os Dias Morrem Deuses – (2017)
