= Antonio Tavares (footballer) =

Mauritanian footballer (born 1975)

Personal information
- Date of birth: December 25, 1975 (age 50)
- Place of birth: France
- Position: Midfielder

Senior career*
Years	Team	Apps	(Gls)
1995–1996	Paris Saint-Germain FC B		
1996–1997	Paris FC		(2)
1997–1998	US Lusitanos Saint-Maur	18	(1)
1998–1999	SSD Marsala Calcio	5	(0)
1999–2002	US Lusitanos Saint-Maur	83	(6)
2002–2005	US Créteil-Lusitanos	35	(1)
2005–2006	KSK Ronse	4	(0)

International career
2003	Mauritania	2	(0)
- * Club domestic league appearances and goals

Antonio Tavares (born 25 December 1975) is a former football manager and former footballer.

== Early life ==
Tavares is a native of Villeneuve-Saint-Georges, France. He attended Paris-East Créteil University in France.

== Career ==
Tavares played for French second-tier side US Créteil-Lusitanos.

== Style of play ==
Tavares mainly operated as a defensive midfielder.

== Personal life ==
Tavares is of Portuguese descent.
