= Ana Hatherly =

Portuguese writer, artist, filmmaker and philologist

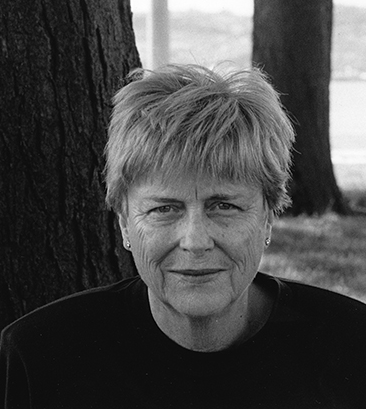
- Born: Anna Maria de Lourdes Rocha Alves Hatherly; May 8, 1929; Porto, Portugal
- Died: August 5, 2015 (aged 86); Lisbon, Portugal
- Known for: writer, artist

Ana Hatherly (8 May 1929 – 5 August 2015) was a Portuguese academic, poet, visual artist, essayist, filmmaker, painter, and writer. She was considered one of the pioneers of the experimental poetry and experimental literature movement in Portugal.

== Biography ==
Hatherly was born in Porto, Portugal, in 1929. She obtained a degree in Germanic philology from the University of Lisbon and a doctorate in Hispanic studies from the University of California, Berkeley, Berkeley, and was also trained in both film and music. Hatherly was a professor of human and social sciences at Universidade Nova de Lisboa, where she founded the university's Institute of Portuguese Studies. She utilized film, visual arts, and poetry in her work, which included the avant-garde.

In 1958, she started her literary career with the publication of Um Ritmo Perdido, a collection of poems. Her poetry books include Um Calculador de Improbabilidades (2001), O Pavão Negro (2003), Itinerários (2003), and Fibrilações (2005). Hatherly has published poetry, essays, and fiction that have been translated into European languages, Japanese and Chinese. She later became Emeritus Professor and a founding member of the Universidade Nova de Lisboa. She was also the Chair of the Portuguese PEN Club.

Hatherly was interested in the visual aspects of poetry, which led to her successfully exploring visual mediums of art, such as painting and films.

Ana Hatherly died in a hospital in Lisbon, on 5 August 2015, at the age of 86. Her funeral was held at the Estrela Basilica in Lisbon, with burial in the Olivais cemetery.

== Poetry ==
- Um Ritmo Perdido (1958)
- As Aparências (1959)
- A Dama e o Cavaleiro (1960)
- Sigma (1965)
- Estruturas Poéticas - Operação 2 (1967)
- Eros Frenético (1968)
- 39 Tisanas (1969)
- Anagramático (1970)
- 63 Tisanas: (40-102) (1973)
- Poesia: 1958-1978 (1980)
- Ana Viva e Plurilida (1982)
- O Cisne Intacto (1983)
- A Cidade das Palavras (1988)
- Volúpsia (1994)
- 351 Tisanas (1997)
- Rilkeana (1999)
- Um Calculador de Improbabilidades (2001)
- O Pavão Negro (2003)
- Itinerários (2003)
- Fibrilações (2005)
- A Idade da Escrita e outros poemas (2005)
- 463 Tisanas (2006)
- A Neo-Penélope (2007)

== Museum collections ==
- Calouste Gulbenkian Museum, Lisbon, Portugal
- Círculo de Artes Plásticas de Coimbra, Coimbra, Portugal
- Morris and Helen Belkin Art Gallery, Vancouver, British Columbia
- Museu Coleção Berardo, Lisbon, Portugal
- Serralves Museum of Contemporary Art, Porto, Portugal
- The Museum of Art, Architecture and Technology, Lisbon, Portugal
- National Museum of Women in the Arts
