= José Alberto Pinheiro =

Portuguese director, screenwriter and producer

- Born: 1980; Porto, Portugal
- Occupation(s): Film Director, Screenwriter, Film Producer
- Years active: 2001–present

José Alberto Pinheiro (born in Porto in 1980) is a Portuguese director, screenwriter and producer.

== Biography ==
In 2000 he founded the underground production group Vigília Filmes, making his screen debut in the following year at the Up And Coming Film Festival Hannover with the short experimental film Closer. Since then he directed, produced and written several fiction and documentary shorts, features and TV series.

He studied film and philosophy and he's been teaching film since 2010 at the Superior School of Music, Arts and Performance (ESMAE) of the Polytechnic Institute of Porto.
In 2010 he directed Who's Baby Jesus Father?, written by award-winning author Manuel Jorge Marmelo, for the series Contos de Natal (Christmas Tales) broadcast by the channels of Rádio e Televisão de Portugal network, Portugal's public service broadcasting organization.
In 2012 he produced the documentary Time Does Not Exist, featuring the geometric abstractionist painter Nadir Afonso.
In 2014, his low budget feature-length debut Mau Mau Maria became the 5th highest grossing Portuguese film of the year and went on to occupy the 19th position of the highest grossing Portuguese films.
In 2017 he produced and directed the documentary Contratempo, a film about the inclusion and rehabilitation of schizophrenia patients, through music and photography. The film won best documentary at FICSAM - International Mental Health Film Festival.

== Filmography ==
- Contratempo (2017)
- Mau Mau Maria (2014)
- After April (2012)
- Ficheiros Médicos (2011)
- Who's Baby Jesus Father? (2010)
- More (2010)
- Dance Me' (2008)
- Gravador (2006)
- Something To Tell You... (2003)
- Summer (2002)
- Closer (2001)
