= Itamar Vieira Junior =

Brazilian writer (born 1979)

- Born: August 6, 1979 (age 47); Salvador, Bahia, Brazil
- Education: Federal University of Bahia
- Writing career
- Notable work: Torto Arado (English: Crooked Plow)

Itamar Vieira Junior (Brazilian Portuguese: [itaˈmaʁ viˈe(j)ɾɐ ˈʒunjoʁ]; born 1979) is a Brazilian writer. He was born in Salvador, Bahia. He has a PhD in Ethnic and African Studies from the Federal University of Bahia. His short story collection A oração do carrasco (The Executioner's Prayer, 2017) was a finalist for the Prêmio Jabuti de Literatura. His novel Torto Arado (Crooked Plow) won the Prêmio LeYa in 2018, the Prêmio Oceanos and the Prêmio Jabuti, both in 2020.

== Biography ==
Vieira Junior was born in Salvador, in 1979. As a teenager, he lived in the state of Pernambuco, and later in the city of São Luís. He started studying geography at the undergraduate course at the Federal University of Bahia, being the first recipient of the Milton Santos Scholarship, dedicated to low-income black youth. He graduated in Geography and completed a master's degree. He holds a doctorate in Ethnic and African Studies from the Federal University of Bahia with a study on the formation of quilombola communities in the interior of the Brazilian Northeast. Itamar is also a public servant at INCRA, the state agency responsible for conducting land reform in Brazil.

== Works ==
- Dias (short stories; 2012)
- A oração do carrasco (short stories; 2017)
- Torto Arado (novel; 2018)
  - English translation: Crooked Plow; Verso Books, 2023.
- Doramar ou a Odisseia (short stories; 2021)
- Salvar o Fogo (novel; 2023)
  - English translation: Saving the Fire; Verso Books, 2026.
- Coração sem Medo (novel; 2025)
