= The Portuguese Falcon =

- Portuguese: Capitão Falcão
- Directed by: João Leitão
- Screenplay by: João Leitão; Núria Leon Bernardo
- Starring: Gonçalo Waddington; David Chan; José Pinto; Rui Mendes; Luís Vicente; Miguel Guilherme; Carla Maciel; Bruno Nogueira; Nuno Lopes; Ricardo Carriço
- Cinematography: Mário Melo Costa
- Edited by: Mário Melo Costa
- Music by: Pedro Marques
- Release date: April 23, 2015 (Portugal)
- Country: Portugal
- Language: Portuguese

The Portuguese Falcon (Portuguese: Capitão Falcão, lit. 'Captain Falcon') is a 2015 Portuguese superhero comedy film directed by João Leitão. It was released on April 23, 2015.

== Synopsis ==
Captain Falcon is a 1960s Portuguese superhero serving António de Oliveira Salazar in the Red Scare-related fight against the communist "red menace". The film is a political satire of both the anti-communist propaganda of the Estado Novo and the left-leaning politics of the Armed Forces Movement.

== Cast ==
- Gonçalo Waddington as Capitão Falcão
- David Chan as Puto Perdiz
- José Pinto as António de Oliveira Salazar
- Rui Mendes
- Luís Vicente as Vladimir Lenin
- Miguel Guilherme as General Gaivota
- Carla Maciel
- Bruno Nogueira
- Nuno Lopes
- Ricardo Carriço

== Production ==
The film was shot in Santarém and Lisbon.

== Reception ==
The film received great critical acclaim.
