= SATUOeiras =

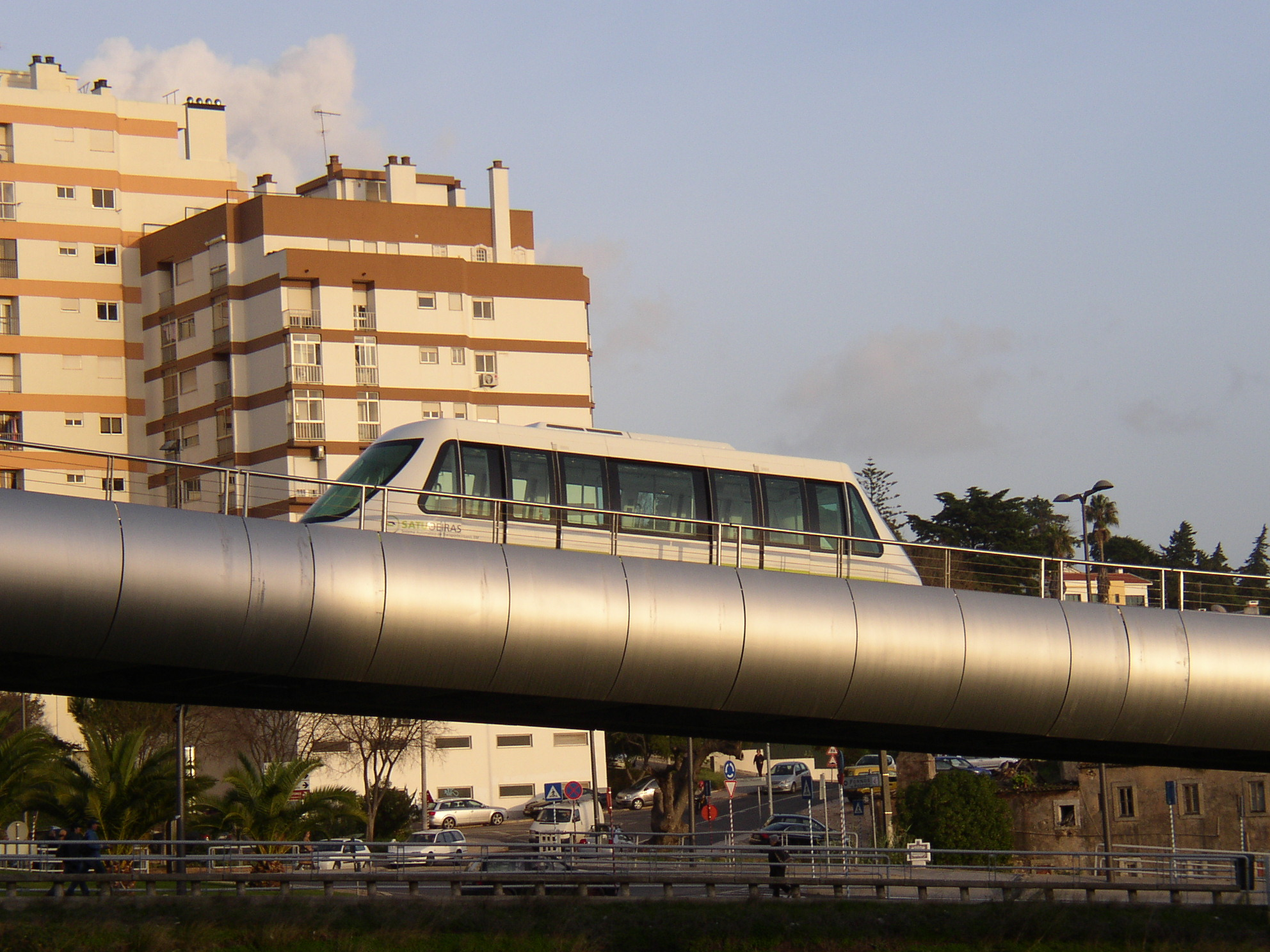
- A SATUOeiras car in 2008

Overview
- Native name: Sistema Automático de Transporte Urbano de Oeiras
- Locale: Oeiras, Portugal
- Transit type: people mover
- Number of lines: 1
- Number of stations: 3

Operation
- Began operation: 2004
- Ended operation: 2015

Technical
- System length: 1.15 km (0.71 mi)
- Top speed: 40 km/h (25 mph)

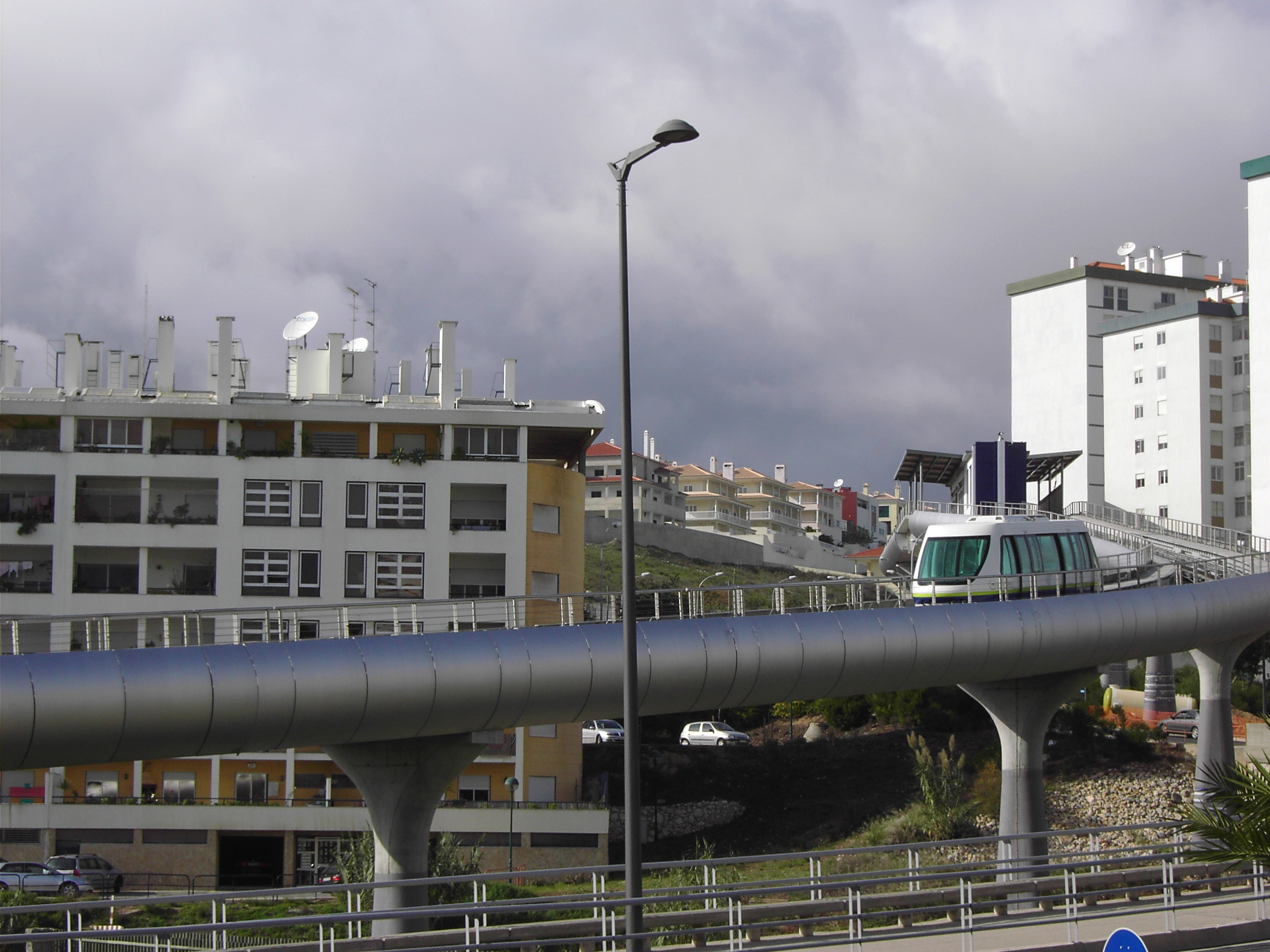
SATUOeiras vehicle approaching Tapadas Station

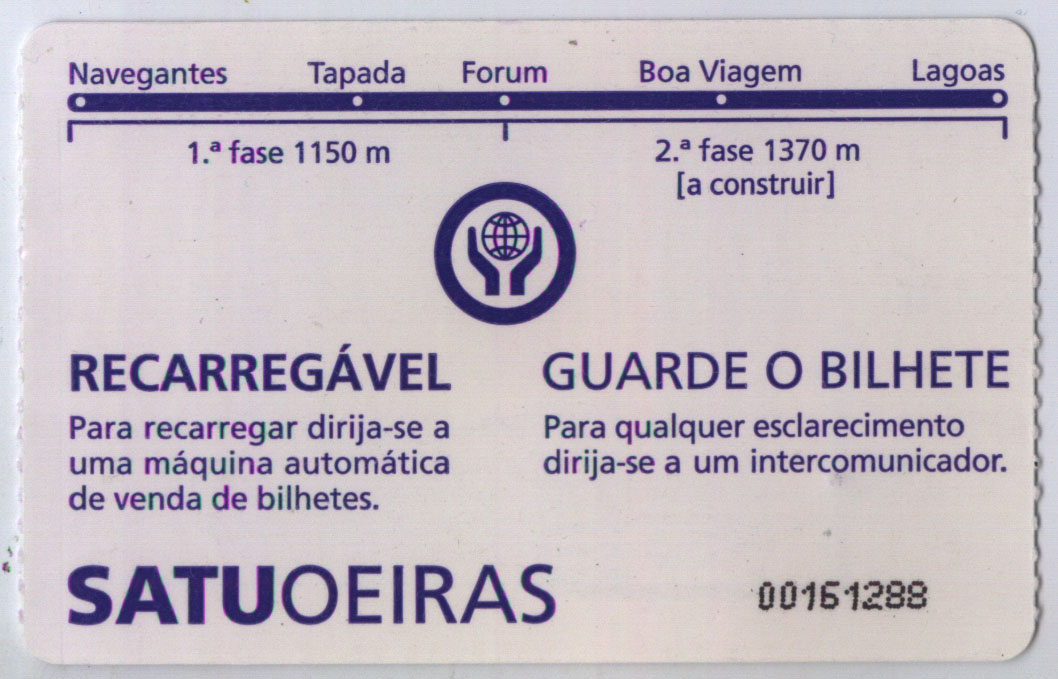
A SATUOeiras fare ticket showing a route outline of phase one and phase two, the latter was never built

SATUOeiras (Sistema Automático de Transporte Urbano de Oeiras), also known simply as SATU, was a 1.15 km (0.71 mi) elevated automated people mover that operated in Oeiras, Portugal from 2004 to 2015. The line connected Paço de Arcos with Oeiras Parque Shopping Center and consisted of 3 stations and 2 cars. Discussions to possibly reopen and expand the line have been ongoing since 2017.

== History ==
Oeiras is a satellite community and commuter town approximately 10 km (6.2 mi) west of Lisbon. SATUOeiras was created as a partnership between Oeiras City Council and Teixeira Duarte with a 51% / 49% ownership structure respectively. Teixeira Duarte, whose headquarters are in Oeiras, was interested in providing better transportation for its employees and connecting its offices in Lagoas Park with the heavily-used Cascais Line.

Construction for SATUOeiras began in 2002 and the line opened on June 7, 2004 at cost of approximately 23 million Euros. Originally intended to be the first phase of a longer system, low ridership and decreasing revenues led to the second phase never materializing. Due to Portuguese laws that prohibit municipal assets to operate at a loss for three consecutive years, SATUOeiras was expected to close as early as 2014. The service was officially terminated on May 31, 2015 after nearly eleven years of operation. As part of the public–private partnership agreement, Teixeira Duarte assumed the deficit.

Isaltino Morais, the former mayor of Oeiras who had originally been in power at the time of SATUOeiras's creation, was elected again as mayor in 2017 on a platform to reopen and expand the system. The municipality of Oeiras has since been in discussions for possible funding options. As of 2024, the line's infrastructure remains but station entrances have been locked up to prevent public access.

== Route ==
SATU's route had its southern terminus at Navegantes Station in the historic parish of Paço de Arcos. This station acted as a transfer to the Lisbon commuter rail network and was just over 100 m (330 ft) from Paço de Arcos Station on the Cascais Line. The route's northern terminus was Forum Station connected to the Oeiras Parque Shopping Center and not far from the Parque dos Poetas. Tapadas Station was located between the two termini and served a residential community and school.

Phase two would have extended SATUOeiras an additional 1.37 km (0.85 mi) to Lagoas Park, a business park in Porto Salvo. Future phases would have extended the line even further to TagusPark and eventually Agualva-Cacém Station in Sintra, providing a link between the Cascais and Sintra Lines.

== Operations ==
SATUOeiras utilized a MiniMetro automated people mover system on an elevated track. The rolling stock were two non-motorized cars that each had a capacity of 106 passengers. Cars were propelled by a cable system powered by an electric motor based at Navegantes Station, not unlike a cable car on a guided track. The line consisted of a single track which split into two at stations. SATUOeiras operated at four-minute intervals during peak times, but would also operate as an on-demand system at times of lowest ridership. During these times, riders would summon a SATU car by pressing a button at the station.

Fares from SATUOeiras were not transferable to other public transport systems in the Lisbon region. A single fare was €1.15 for a one-way trip or €1.65 for a same-day return trip. SATU also offered an unlimited daypass for €2.85, a 10-trip pass for €6.15, and a 20-trip pass for €10.25.
