= Luís da Silva Mouzinho de Albuquerque =

Portuguese military officer, engineer, poet, scientist and politician

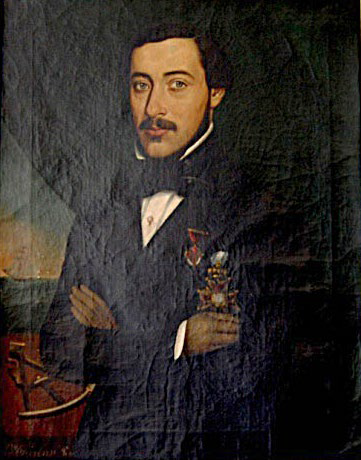
- Born: June 16, 1792; Lisbon, Portugal
- Died: December 27, 1846 (aged 54); Torres Novas, Portugal

Luís da Silva Mouzinho de Albuquerque (June 16, 1792 in Lisbon – December 27, 1846 in Torres Vedras; Portuguese pronunciation: [luˈiʒ ðɐ ˈsilvɐ moˈziɲu ðɨ alβuˈkɛɾkɨ]) was a Portuguese military officer, engineer, poet, scientist and politician, who distinguished himself during the Liberal Wars and in the conflicts that marked Portugal's history in the first half of the 19th century. He served as the Minister of the Kingdom (a post similar to today's Minister of Internal Affairs) during the liberal regency of Pedro of Braganza (formerly Pedro I of Brazil and IV of Portugal). This was the most prominent post inside the government at that time, which made him the Prime Minister of Portugal in all but name. He was also several times minister and deputy minister during the Constitutional Monarchical period. Among other offices, he served as Chief of the National Mint, captain-general and governor of Madeira, and inspector-general of public works. He was the grandfather of Joaquim Augusto Mouzinho de Albuquerque, a military officer and colonial administrator.

== Biography ==
Luís da Silva Mouzinho de Albuquerque was born in Lisbon on June 16, 1792, son of João Pedro Mouzinho de Albuquerque (1736–1802) and Dona Luísa da Silva Gutiérrez de Ataíde (1763–18??), both from noble families. His father was a Fidalgo-knight of the Royal House and possessed two estates in Chelas. His mother was the daughter of Luís da Silva de Ataíde, a senior-guard of the Leiria pine forest and Lord of Casa do Terreiro.

=== Formative years and marriage ===
Until he was seven years old, Mouzinho de Albuquerque was taught by a French tutor. He showed an extraordinary precocious talent, being very studious and fond of poetry, design and the physical sciences. While still a child, Mouzinho composed several poems and wrote a verse translation of Jean Racine's tragedy Andromaque. His interest in natural science was the inspiration for his entomological, mineralogical and chemical collections later in life.

His father intended him to follow an ecclesiastical career and, after his family moved to Leiria, Mouzinho started his theological studies, attending Latin classes organised by Bishop Manuel de Aguiar. He also entered the Order of Saint John of Jerusalem. However, he soon recognized that he did not have the necessary vocation for the sacerdotal life and, after his father's death in 1802, he left the institute where his parents had enrolled him.

Mouzinho opted for a military career, entering the Portuguese Navy. He found obstacles to his career and soon transferred to the Portuguese Army, and became a cadet in the Royal Brigade. At the same time, he started attending the Royal Naval Academy where he studied mathematics, and was awarded a prize every year. He worked at the Royal Observatory of Lisbon, as a portionist between 1813 and 1814.

He fell in love with his cousin, Ana Mascarenhas de Ataíde, who was the daughter of his mother's sister and José Diogo Mascarenhas Neto, head postmaster and alderman of the Lisbon City Senate. Realising that he did not have the necessary means to make a suitable marriage for her, he decided to abandon his studies and dedicated himself to agriculture, with assistance from relatives, the Tudela Castilho family, who lived in Fundão.

In 1814, he established himself in Santarém, then again in Fundão. He returning to Lisbon to marry his cousin, returning to Fundão where the couple lived until 1820, occupying themselves with agriculture.

By this time he had written many poems, a tragedy, and his best literary work: Geórgicas Portuguesas. He also collaborated with the Jornal de Coimbra (Journal of Coimbra) and with the Anais das Ciências e das Letras (Annals of the Sciences and Letters), a Portuguese newspaper founded and edited by his father-in-law, which was published in Paris.

=== Studies in Paris and direction of the National Mint ===
In 1820, his father-in-law asked Mouzinho to come to him in Paris, where he was exiled. Mouzinho immediately occupied himself with editing the Annals of the Sciences and Letters. Between 1821 and 1823, he published many articles under his name, mainly about Portuguese agriculture and industrial affairs.

At that time, he also published a work about educational policy with the title Ideas About the Establishment of the Public Instruction, where he discussed the creation of a network of parochial primary schools for both sexes and a network of municipal secondary schools, a plan that would only come to fruition a century later.

He remained in Paris for the next three years, attending public courses and university laboratories of chemistry and physics, being a student of Louis Nicolas Vauquelin (1763–1829) and working in the laboratories of the Paris Botanical Garden. He presented a work to the Institute of France concerning simplification of the study of chemical analysis, which could be considered a synoptic list of reactions. This work resulted in the publication of a paper by two of the most prestigious scientists of the time: Jean-Antoine Chaptal and Joseph-Louis Gay-Lussac. In 1822, Mouzinho made an educational trip to Switzerland, returning to Portugal soon after. In 1823, he was elected corresponding associate of the Royal Academy of Sciences of Lisbon.

After the revolt of the Vilafrancada in 1823, absolutism once again held sway in Portugal. Mouzinho's father-in-law introduced him to Pedro de Sousa Holstein, the 1st Marquis of Palmela and minister, who appointed him Superintendent of the National Mint (Casa da Moeda). This position obliged him to give lectures in chemistry and physics in the Mint's laboratory, a department created by a royal decree of 1801. In 1824, while working at this post, he wrote and published an Elementary Course on Physics and Chemistry for students of these subjects, the first work of its kind in Portugal. In the same year he was elected to associate membership of the Royal Academy of Sciences.

Soon after, he was nominated a member of the Weights and Measures Commission and in 1825 was ordered by the government to study and analyze the mineral waters of São Miguel Island in the Azores. This visit resulted in an interesting "memoir", published in Lisbon the year after, that constituted the first scientific work published in Portuguese on Azorean hydrogeology.

=== Exile in France, Brazil and the Azores and participation in the struggles for liberalism ===
After joining the liberal cause and swearing fidelity to the Constitutional Charter, Mouzinho departed for France. There he learned of the absolutist revolution that had put Miguel I of Portugal into power. He remained in France as a "liberal émigré" and soon as it was possible he departed for Brazil where, together with Joaquim António de Aguiar, the Count of Óbidos and the Count of Sabugal, he asked Pedro I of Brazil (formerly Pedro IV of Portugal, and Miguel’s brother) to support the cause of his daughter, Princess Maria da Glória of Portugal, and the Constitutional Charter.

He occupied the post of secretary to António Severim de Noronha, who was at that time Count of Vila Flor and later became Duke of Terceira, with whom he established a relationship of political loyalty that would last until his death. This relationship explains Mouzinho's political ascendancy in the following years.

He departed from Brazil in 1829, going to Terceira in the Azores, where he met the chiefs of the liberal resistance. Soon after, in 1830, he was chosen for Secretary of State (a position equivalent to Prime Minister) of the Regency in Angra. It was in this post that he signed the famous Proclamation to the Portuguese dated March 20, 1830. He served the liberal cause assiduously, being a member of the commission that in 1831 traveled to London in the name of the Regency which obtained credits that made possible the survival of the liberal cause in the Azores.

On his return to Terceira, he asked to be relieved of the political tasks of his posts so he could participate as officer in the Armed Forces and as right-hand man to the Count of Vila Flor in the expeditions to São Jorge Island and Faial Island. In this position, he took part in the Battle of Ladeira do Gato. Having served in the highest posts during the liberal wars, he never wanted to be paid more than a subaltern, which was his official rank.

=== Expedition to Madeira ===
Dom Pedro arrived in Terceira and assumed power that had until then been held by the Regency. He then appointed Mouzinho de Albuquerque to the post of captain-general of Madeira, even though the island was still in the hands of the absolutists. To take charge of his post, Mouzinho left from Terceira on board the frigate D. Maria II, as part of an expedition led by Admiral George Rose Sartorius intended to force the surrender of Funchal.

Besides Mouzinho, Januário Vicente Camacho, the deacon of the See of Funchal and other constitutionalists took part. However, Sartorius had to retire because the actual defences of Madeira were much stronger than what was previously believed, and he had insufficient forces for a landing. Because the nearby Porto Santo Island had been occupied on April 4, 1832, by a constitutionalist force with 60 artillery pieces, which had arrived from Terceira in the ships Conde de Vila Flor and Terceira, Mouzinho went there on April 7 and decided to wait there for the right moment to conquer Madeira.

Installed in Porto Santo, Mouzinho was in an awkward situation, where he was neither able to conquer Madeira nor suffer an attack from the major island. He had to wait some time before another ship came from the Azores. During this wait, some ships were captured and their cargo used as supplies for the island's inhabitants, who were suffering famine because the previous year's harvest in the island had been poor and supplies from Madeira were being blocked. Calm and order were present in Porto Santo during the occupation, due to the discipline of Mouzinho de Albuquerque's troops and the excellent control of him and his officers. While in Porto Santo he also wrote a poem, "Ruy, o Escudeiro", which he published many years later.

Upon its arrival on May 5, 1832, a constitutionalist ship allowed him to escape his awkward position using it to return to Terceira. He took with him 104 volunteers who had escaped Madeira to enlist in the constitutional army and in Terceira they joined forces that were being prepared for a major attack on continental Portugal.

=== Final years of the civil war ===
Along with the forces whom he returned to join, Mouzinho took part in the Mindelo Landing and the Siege of Porto, where he served brilliantly as a military officer and statesman. On July 29, 1832, he replaced Pedro de Sousa Holstein, Marquis of Palmela, and occupied the post of interim Minister of the Kingdom, a position he held until September 25 of that year, when Sousa Holstein reassumed the post.

During the regency of D. Pedro in Porto, he was once more Minister of the Kingdom, this time in a titular capacity only, from November 10, 1832. The political instability resulting from the war and conflicts within liberals, curtailed tenure of ministries, and a few weeks after he had taken power, Mouzinho was replaced by Bernardo de Sá Nogueira de Figueiredo, the future Marquis of Sá da Bandeira. However, Mouzinho continued to be a major figure trusted by Prince Regent Pedro, collaborating with his regency governments.

Being a supporter of António Severim de Noronha, future Duke of Terceira, to whom he was devoted and for whom he held the utmost respect, Mouzinho advised him to start a campaign from the south (Algarve) and accompanied him, becoming part of his general staff until the end of the civil war.

=== Prefecture in Madeira ===
In 1834, following the Concession of Evoramonte, Mouzinho de Albuquerque returned to Madeira to occupy the position he had previously been appointed to two years earlier, not as captain-general, a post liberalism had abolished, but as prefect of the new-born Prefecture of Funchal.

He was nominated by a royal decree of June 30, 1834, having taken office on August 6 of the same year. His administration was short, as he left the post on September 30, 1835, departing to Lisbon on November 11 with a promise of the Governorship of Portuguese India. This did not come to pass because he was nominated Minister of the Kingdom in the government of José Jorge Loureiro.

His administration in Madeira, characterized by a "great impartiality and justice", resulted in numerous improvements, namely in education, with the creation of schools, and in public assistance and with the construction of roads.

A consequence of his experience in Madeira were the studies that he would publish in 1837 about the archipelago's geology (Observation to serve the geological history of the islands of Madeira, Porto Santo and Desertas), as well as a text—perhaps one of the first works about Madeiran autonomy, as seen from an outsider's point of view—about the government of that Portuguese territory.

Political connections established in Madeira made possible for him to be elected by that constituency in the parliamentary election of August 12, 1838 (3rd legislature).

=== Initial period of the constitutional monarchy ===
After his appointment as governor of Portuguese India fell through, he was named Minister of the Kingdom in the government of José Jorge Loureiro. He occupied the post between November 25, 1835 and April 20, 1836. When the government collapsed on this date, Mouzinho, apparently disillusioned with politics, retired from active politics and returned to Paris, where he acquired a small estate. He later returned to Portugal and occupied himself with agriculture and his family.

In 1836, the government sent him as a military engineer to the Central Division of Public Works. However, he could not do much for the public improvement of the country since public funds available were low, and soon afterwards the September Revolution started.

When the reaction to Septemberism started in 1837, Mouzinho de Albuquerque, loyal to his friend the Duke of Terceira, took part in the so-called Revolt of the Marshals. As a consequence, he became involved in the combat of Chão da Freira, and he was among the defeated. After the definitive crushing of the revolt he was forced into exile, together with the marshal's troops and with other officers involved. He went to Spain and then to Paris, where, together with the Duke of Palmela, the Duke of Saldanha and the Duke of Terceira, he wrote an open letter to the Portuguese congress defending the constitutional charter.

When peace was signed and the Portuguese Constitution of 1838 established, Mouzinho swore to uphold it in August 1839. A few days later, he was again named general inspector of public works in the Central Division. In March 1840, he became inspector-general of Public Construction Service of the Kingdom and appointed to reform this service. He occupied this post until 1843 in spite of being asked again to fill the post of governor of Portuguese India in June 1840, which he declined.

From time to time during this period he added other duties of a political character to his position of Inspector-General. He wrote several texts, including a technical guide to the building of masonry bridges, intended for engineers of his time and offered for publication to the Royal Academy of Sciences. He also presented several reports and plans on the constructions of the service over which he presided, namely the Fort of Porto, the canal in Azambuja and the restoration of the Monastery of Batalha, concerning which he published an interesting technical work.

Entering active politics again, he was elected to the parliament in many legislatures. When António Bernardo da Costa Cabral promulgated the restoration of the Constitutional Charter in Porto, he was once again Minister of the Kingdom and the interim Minister of Justice in the government of the Duke of Terceira, continuing in that post for 9–20 February 1842.

Although he was a chartist, he opposed the more reactionary factions that were arising at that time, maintaining that the restoration of the Charter should be made in a legitimate and correct manner, and calling for a constituent Cortes to undo the work of the Constituent Congress of 1838. The restorers did not want that, and after being insulted by the cabralists, Mouzinho resigned on February 24, 15 days after the government took office, being replaced by Costa Cabral. After his resignation, he started to sit in the parliamentary opposition benches.

A year later, he was dismissed from his post of Inspector-General of public construction. His parliamentary life from 1842 to 1844 was considered brilliant. He then accepted management of works on Porto's river fort that a construction company had started. He had just contributed a plan, but the company then folded. After this, he was director of the works on the Azambuja canal, and having lost his seat in the Parliament in the election of 1845, he went to a farm of his in Leiria, occupying himself with his family.

=== Return to government and death during the Patuleia revolt ===
When the Revolution of Maria da Fonte, which started in Minho region in April and May 1846, forced Queen Maria II of Portugal to dismiss the government led by António Bernardo da Costa Cabral, she chose the Duke of Palmela to form a new one. Although in the beginning of May, Mouzinho had been named civil governor of the District of Leiria, a post he would never occupy de facto, he was appointed to the Ministry of the Navy, and occupied it only during 23–26 May 1846 because he was transferred to the Ministry of the Kingdom, a position he retained until the fall of the government.

With the palace coup d'état known as the Ambush on October 6 of that year, the government was dismissed summarily, which provoked the generalized revolt of the enemies of cabralism and led to the constitution of the Porto Junta. Mouzinho was among the insurgents, supporting Septemberism. With civil war unleashed, he was active in the Patuleia, allied with the Marquess of Sá da Bandeira and the Count of Lavradio.

At that time, he was a colonel and accompanied the division commanded by General José Travassos Valdez, 1st Count of Bonfim when he occupied Torres Vedras. He was placed in command of the old fort of the town, actively participating in its defence. During the battle, fought on December 23, he was seriously wounded and died four days later on December 27, 1846.

Luís da Silva Mouzinho de Albuquerque was Royal House Fidalgo, of Her Majesty's Council, knight of the Order of Saint John of Jerusalem, great-cross of the Order of the Immaculate Conception of Vila Viçosa and bearer of the Order of the Tower and Sword. He was an associate of different national and international scientific associations, including the Royal Academy of Sciences of Lisbon and the prestigious Institut de France.

Five children were born from his marriage with Ana Mascarenhas de Ataíde:

- Fernando Luís Mouzinho de Albuquerque, national deputy contributing to Portuguese political and military life
- Isabel Gabriela Mouzinho de Albuquerque
- José Diogo Mascarenhas Mouzinho de Albuquerque, military officer who participated with his father in the Patuleia, and father of Joaquim Augusto Mouzinho de Albuquerque, a hero of the colonial wars of the 19th century, responsible for the capture of Gungunhana
- Maria Luísa Joana Mouzinho de Albuquerque
- Luísa Henriqueta Isabel Longuinha Mouzinho de Albuquerque

== Published works ==
- Ideas about the Establishment of Public Instruction, dedicated to the Portuguese nation, and Offered to its Representatives, Paris, 1823
- Elementary Course on Physics and Chemistry, Lisbon, 1824
- Observations about São Miguel Island Collected by the Commission Sent to Same Island in August 1825, Having Returned in October of the Same Year, by Luiz da Silva Mousinho de Albuquerque and his assistant Ignacio Pitta de Castro Menezes, Lisbon, Royal Press, 1826 (republished in a facsimile version by the Municipal Chamber of Povoação, Açores, 1989)
- Observations to Serve the Geological History of the Islands of Madeira, Porto Santo and Desertas, with the Geognostic Description of the Same Islands, in volume XII, part I, of Memories of the Royal Academy of Sciences of Lisbon
- Brief Exposition of the Effort Tried in Favour of the Constitutional Charter in Portugal, in the Months from July to October 1837, edited in Pontevedra and then in Lisbon, 1837
- Report of the Minister and Secretary of State of the Kingdom Affairs, presented to the Cortes in 1836, Lisbon, 1836
- Report of the Public Constructions of the Kingdom, by the Inspector-General, Lisbon, 1840
- General Report on Public Construction in the Kingdom, by the Inspector, etc., presented on 8 July 1840, Lisbon, 1840
- Report of the Inspection on the Internal Works and Communications in the Kingdom Districts North of the Tagus river, Performed in October and November 1842 by the Inspector, Lisbon, 1843
- Engineer's Guide to Stone Bridge Building, Lisbon, 1840
- Inedict Memoir on the Monumental Building of Batalha, Leiria, 1854
- Portuguese Georgics, (dedicated to his wife Ana Mascarenhas de Ataíde), Paris, 1820
- The Glory of the Conquests, (poemette) published by the Journal of Coimbra, volume XIV
- The Day (poem) 1813, with a second edition, Lisbon, 1825;
