= Belenzada =

Coup

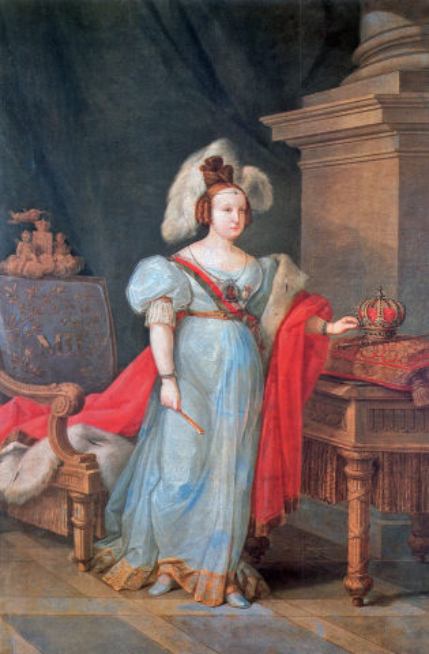
Maria II of Portugal (1834)

Ferdinand II of Portugal (1836)

The Belenzada (“Belém Affair”) was an attempted coup in November 1836 by Queen Maria II of Portugal and her husband Ferdinand II to remove the liberal government established by the September Revolution and reinstate the Constitutional Charter of 1826. Despite enjoying diplomatic support from the United Kingdom and Belgium, the attempt was frustrated by the determination of the National Guard, the regular army and the general population of Lisbon.

== Background ==
Maria II had been Queen of Portugal only since 1834 when she was fourteen. When she married Ferdinand of Saxe-Coburg Gotha, nephew of Leopold I of Belgium on 9 April 1836 she was seventeen years old, and her husband eighteen.

Politically, the period 1834-1836 was known as devorismo (“devourism’) because it was characterised by a sense of unprincipled greed, whereby leading politicians spent public funds to secure personal gain for themselves or their associates. This period came to an abrupt end in 1836 with the September Revolution.

== The September revolution ==
The view of Lord Howard de Walden, British Minister in Lisbon, was that the September Revolution had succeeded largely due to the influence of the French Minister in Lisbon, Comte de Saint-Priest, who regarded Portuguese Prime Minister Terceira as an instrument of British policy. Saint-Priest saw the revolution as an opportunity to replace Terceira with a government more amenable to French views. When Chartists began planning a coup, Saint-Priest condemned them openly and threatened them with negative consequences from France. Howard de Walden, in contrast, felt that the Septembrist government of Sá da Bandeira and Passos Manuel was fundamentally anti-British.

The night after she accepted the September Revolution and invited Sá da Bandeira to form a government, the Queen had members of the international diplomatic corps “as the only free people to be found in the palace” sign as witnesses to a statement by her that only violence had compelled her to make these concessions. The British and Belgian ministers were later to use this document as the basis for justifying foreign intervention in Portugal. To reduce the danger of being deposed and replaced by a more tractable member of the royal family, she further sought to secure her position by obtaining written statements from her aunt, Dona Isabel Maria (18 September), and her stepmother the Duchess of Bragança (21 September) renouncing any hope or claim of occupying the throne themselves.

== Preparations for a coup ==
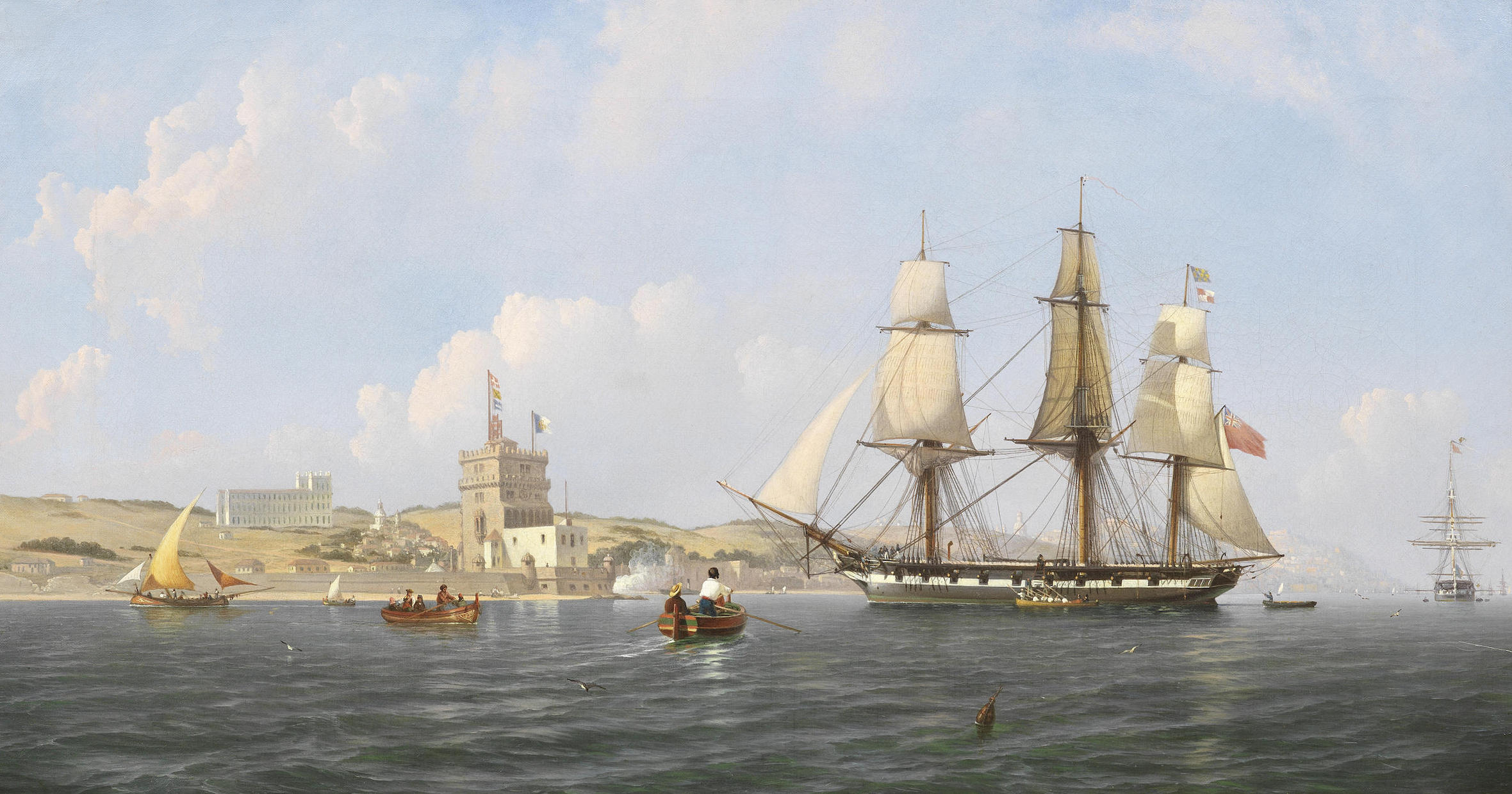
An English frigate arriving in the Tagus at Belém

The foreign representative most active in seeking ways of supporting the Queen to undo the September Revolution was Sylvain Van de Weyer of Belgium; King Leopold was interested in having Portugal lease one of its African colonies to him in return for his support. He tried to persuade Britain to intervene, or at least to transport Belgian troops to Portugal, but Britain refused to embark on this kind of direct involvement. Leopold therefore had to find a less obvious means of shaping events. Saldanha and (pt) Freire were involved in discussions about these plans with Belgium.

Eventually the Queen appealed for help directly to Britain, which responded that she could be assured of the protection of the British fleet in the Tagus. Indeed, if she could move to the Belém Palace and have a minister in her government sign a direct appeal, Britain would guarantee to protect her entire government, providing it enjoyed popular support. Almost immediately, news of these negotiations found its way into the radical and nationalist Lisbon press, provoking angry reactions. On 2 November movements were observed among the British warships that suggested troops were about to be landed.

Among the devorista ex-ministers associated with the Queen, there was no agreement on what to do. Saldanha's plan was to start a rebellion in the provinces, which were generally conservative in outlook, and use this to signal to the Queen that she and her government could openly call for assistance. However his rival Terceira started matters precipitately on 3 November, following his own plan, confident that once the initial steps were taken, British troops would intervene.

== 3 November ==
On the morning of 3 November, Lisbon was full of rumours about an impending royal coup with British military support, and the Revista ran an editorial praising the constitution of 1826, comparing it favourably with others in Europe. The Queen summoned Sá da Bandeira and Passos Manuel to the Necessidades Palace. They offered her their resignations, but she neither accepted nor refused them. Passos Manuel warned her that if she attempted to seek refuge on a British ship as her grandfather had done in 1824, this would be considered to signal her abdication. The Queen then took the court to the Belém Palace, where they arrived at four in the afternoon. Chartists in the surrounding neighbourhoods had secretly been armed. At nine in the evening Terceira set off from Belém to mobilise the army and loyal elements of the National Guard in Lisbon.

At ten o’clock at night the Queen sent orders for all her ministers to present themselves at Belém. The ministers gathered instead at the house of Passos Manuel to decide what to do. Eventually they decided to send only Passos Manuel, Lumiares and pt:António Vieira de Castro.

At Belém the Queen confirmed that she was dismissing all of her ministers and appointing a new cabinet under the Marquês de Valença. Owing to the short life of this government (one day), which happened to coincide with All Souls Day (Portuguese: dia de finados) it came to be known as the “Gabinete dos Finados” or “pt:Gabinete dos Mortos” (“cabinet of the dead”) She also signed a decree reinstating the Comstitutional Charter of 1826. Troops loyal to the Queen controlled the São Jorge Castle in Lisbon, but there was so much confusion of orders and counter-orders from different parties on the night of 3 November that it was not long before the citadel was taken over by units of the National Guard loyal to the dismissed government. The remainder of the National Guard was also mobilised against the coup and began to muster overnight at Campo de Ourique. Saldanha, still pursuing his own plans, had sent the most reliable government troops into the provinces to prepare for a revolt there, leaving Lisbon exposed.

== 4 November ==
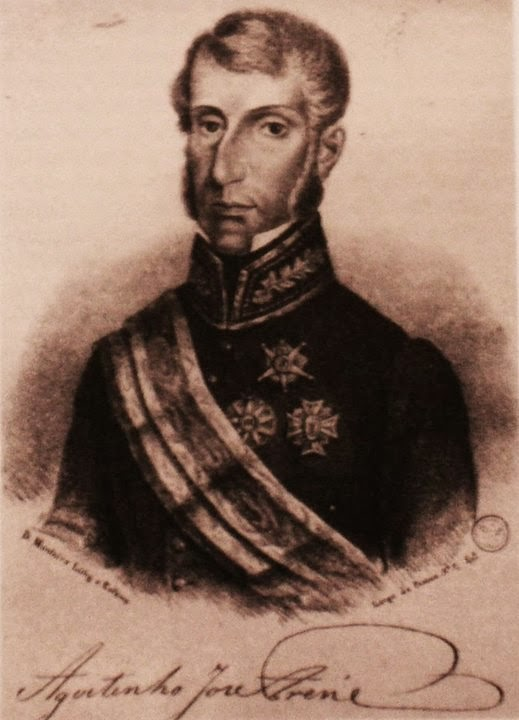
Agostinho José Freire

On the morning of 4 November the streets surrounding the Belém Palace were filled with armed men and artillery. At half past nine the new Prime Minister, Valença, sent an order to the castle of São Jorge instructing the telegraph office there to communicate to the rest of the country that the Queen had dismissed the previous government and reinstated the Constitutional Charter of 1826, and that “order and enthusiasm reign in the capital” but the governor of the castle refused to do so.

The National Guard battalions gathering in Campo de Ourique were joined by large numbers of ordinary people, who demanded arms and were eventually given them. It was agreed that before any action was taken, the Queen should be informed of their determination, and asked to set aside the bad advice she had been given thus far. Passos Manuel and Luiz Ribeiro de Sousa Saraiva were chosen as the “Belem Commissioners”, delegated to take this message to her. The people in Campo de Ourique also chose a junta to ensure authority and Sá da Bandeira was made commander.

Various former devorist ministers were called to Belém to assist the new government and one of them, Agostinho José Freire, headed for the palace in a carriage, wearing his full regalia. On his way he ran into a group of the National Guard. He stepped out of his carriage and was shot by a guardsman. The furious mob tore off his decorations, robbed his valuables, and dumped his body in a common grave at a cemetery.

Freire's murder caused panic in Belém and some of those who were armed began to slip back to their homes, leaving their arms behind. The rivalry between Terceira and Saldanha was so great that once the coup started, Saldanha refused to go to Belem until positively urged to do so by Lord Howard de Walden. However, when Passos Manuel and Ribeiro Saraiva arrived at the palace, surrounded by threats and curses from the Chartist crowds gathered outside, Saldanha came out, took them by the arm, and escorted them safely inside. In a show of strength, the Queen received the Belém Commissioners in the presence of King Ferdinand and the rest of the royal family, Palmela, Saldanha, Trigoso, and many former ministers, generals, Howard de Walden, Van de Weyer and the entire foreign diplomatic corps. After extended discussions a compromise was reached, although what exactly this was is not entirely clear, since differing accounts quickly appeared. Passos Manuel arrived back at Campo de Ourique at four in the afternoon and discussions followed on the court's proposals. Some were accepted, but the reinstitution of the House of Peers was categorically rejected. Sá da Bandeira was appointed to communicate this to the Queen.

At Belém, while the court waited for a response to its proposals, some of the artillery units around the palace began to shout support for the constitution of 1820. Alarmed, King Ferdinand rode out with some mounted soldiers and chased them away. Concern grew that the court could not safely rely on its own army, and the Queen appealed to Howard de Walden to send British troops to protect her. Between 500 and 700 were landed between Belém and Alcântara on the night of 4 November. News of this intervention had the opposite effect to that intended, as there was general indignation among the population of Lisbon and it seemed likely that there would be a mass march on Belém. Passos Manuel and the Septembrists at Campo de Ourique absolutely refused to enter into any discussions for as long as foreign troops were on Portuguese soil. Realising her mistake, the Queen had the British troops returned to their ships and Sá da Bandeira was invited to a meeting with Saldanha for further negotiations.

== 5 November ==
On the morning of 5 November the Queen found herself with no support from foreign troops, her own army increasingly disaffected and going over to the Septembrists, and a firm consensus of the people of Lisbon rejecting the course of action she had taken. She agreed to the terms Sá da Bandeira had agreed with Saldanha. She reappointed the cabinet she had dismissed two days before, but was able to secure assurances that the royal power as set out it in the 1826 charter, including the royal veto and the right to dissolve the Chamber of Deputies, would be respected.

As word spread in Belém that the National Guard was marching on the palace, those who had supported the Queen the previous day quickly melted away, leaving it almost deserted. The Queen and her husband, abandoned by their supporters, agreed to Sá da Bandeira's proposal that they move back to the Necessidades Palace. They arrived at five in the afternoon to a tremendously enthusiastic welcome from the National Guard and the Septembrist crowds. Howard de Walden claimed that on 5 November the Queen was advised that her sister Princess Maria Amélia was to be put in the throne in her place, prompting her to come rapidly to an accommodation with the Septembrists.

== Aftermath ==
After the Queen's return to Lisbon, the army returned to quarters, the National Guard returned home, and calm was restored to the city. the Constituent Cortes, summoned in October, met on 12 November. On 18 November an amnesty was issued for all those involved in the attempted coup.

A number of people associated with the attempted coup were obliged to flee the country, including the Duque de Palmela and his son, as well as pt:José da Silva Carvalho, (pt) Vila Real and the 1st Baron Rendufe, who took refuge aboard HMS Malabar on the Tagus and then sailed to England.
