= Revolt of the Marshals =

Attempted coup in Portugal 1837

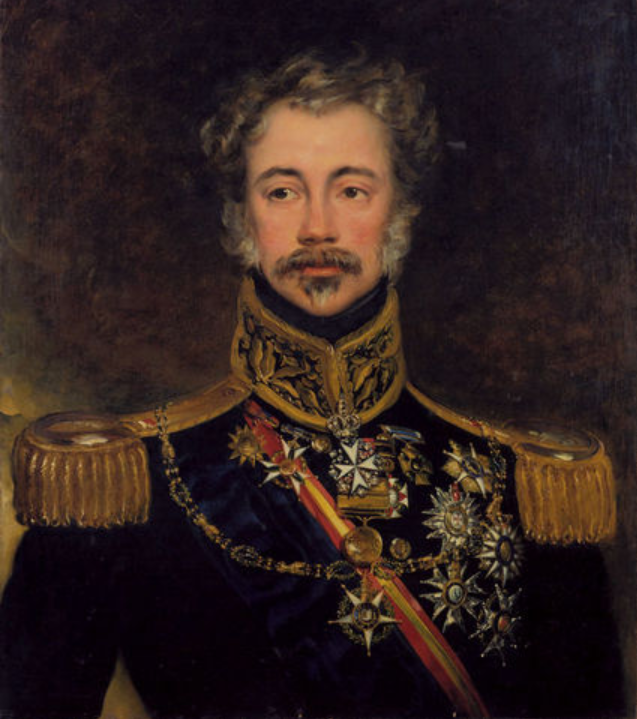
Marshal Saldanha

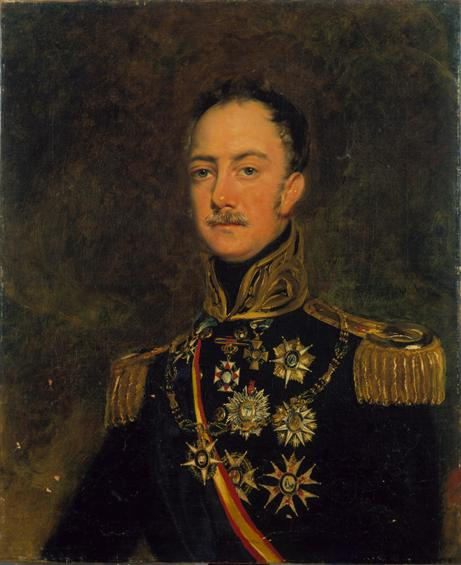
Marshal Terceira

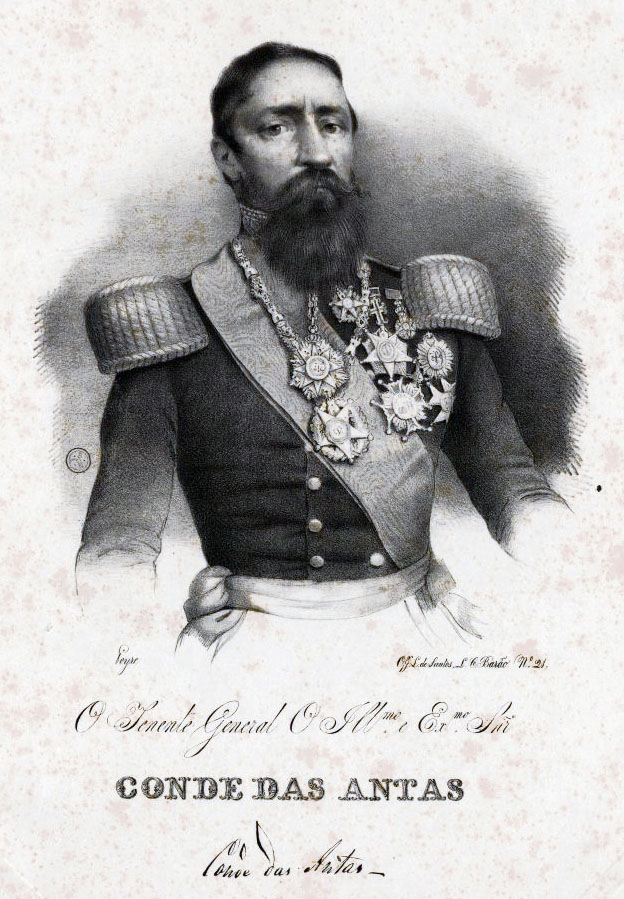
Conde das Antas

The Revolt of the Marshals (Portuguese: Revolta dos Marechais) was an unsuccessful Chartist military coup in Portugal against the Setembrist government of António Dias de Oliveira in 1837. It was led by marshals Saldanha and Terceira. Ultimately the rebels lacked the numbers to succeed, and failed to raise any support in Lisbon.

== Context ==
The September Revolution of 1836 had set aside the Constitutional Charter of 1826 and reinstated the Constitution of 1822. In November that year the Queen mounted the failed Belenzada coup to remove the Septembrist government and restore the 1826 Constitutional Charter. The same month a Constituent Congress was convened to promulgate a new constitution. This eventually resulted in the Portuguese Constitution of 1838.

== Course of the revolt ==
On 12 July the 4th battalion of light cavalry under the command of the (pt) Visconde de Leiria, quartered in Ponte da Barca, marched on Braga demanding the return of the Constitutional Charter of 1826. They tried to enter Braga but were forced to fall back on Valença.

Marshal Saldanha commanding several platoons of lancers and Marshal Terceira with a detachment from the 7th infantry regiment advanced to Torres Novas, where they joined up with Luís da Silva Mouzinho de Albuquerque and proclaimed the establishment of a provisional regency. They then advanced on Lisbon.

In response to the revolt, the government divided the country into two military commands; the north under Sá da Bandeira and the south under Bonfim. Forces were moved from the south of the country to put down the revolt, which created the conditions for a re-emergence of miguelist guerrillas in the Algarve. Other miguelist groups also sprang up in Beira and Minho.

In Lisbon, the liberal press alleged the revolt was being inspired and funded by British interests for the purpose of establishing a government that would end protectionist policies and open Portuguese markets to imports from Britain. The marshals were denounced as devorists and agents of a foreign power. The Constituent Congress suspended its debates for the duration of the conflict, and constitutional rights were suspended likewise.

The defences of the capital had been strengthened by the Conde de Bonfim, and the marshals were obliged to retreat to the north. On 28 August a battle was fought at Chão da Feira, near Batalha. Following this a meeting between Sá da Bandeira, Bonfim and Saldanha was unable to agree an armistice, and the rebels retreated back north.

== The battle of Ruivães ==
On 11 September 1837 government forces under the Conde das Antas reached Porto, and on 16th they set off towards Braga to meet the rebels. After a skirmish near Vila Nova de Famalicão they entered Braga without a fight the following day and moved up onto the heights of pt:Salamonde near (pt) Ruivães.

The rebel forces under the Visconde de Leiria consisted of consisted of an artillery battery, the 3rd squadron of cavalry, two battalions of light cavalry, a battalion of the Queen's Volunteers, as well as some infantry; the 17th regiment, most of the 18th, and some battalions of the 1st. Government forces consisted of a brigade of light cavalry and three brigades of infantry, supported by National Guard from Lisbon and Porto; a squadron of lancers and two squadrons of the 6th Cavalry, an artillery battery a detachment of sappers. The rebels were defending a position protected by a river with a bridge.

At dawn on 18 September the Visconde of the Antas advanced forces into attacking positions across the river. Fighting began at ten in the morning and continued until one in the afternoon, when the rebels, outnumbered and outflanked, broke and fled. Hundreds were captured and held prisoner. Government troops pursued the remnants of the rebel forces in the afternoon and on the following day.

== Convention of Chaves ==
On 29 September, at Chaves, the Visconde das Antas and the two Marshals On 20 September the Chartists signed an agreement which allowed them to go into exile in Spain. On 12 October a decree was promulgated removing Saldanha, Terceira and other leaders of the revolt from the army.
