= Francisco Manuel Trigoso =

Portuguese politician

Francisco Trigoso
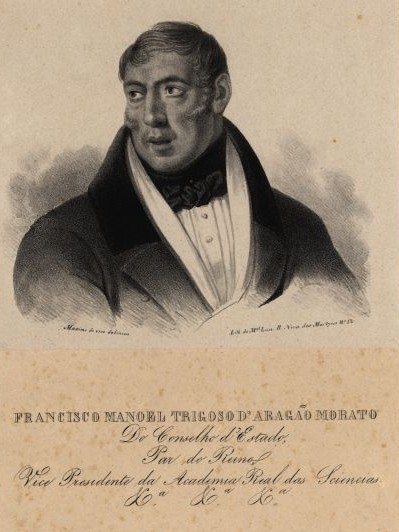
- Born: 17 September 1777; Lisbon, Portugal
- Died: 11 December 1838 (aged 61); Lisbon, Portugal
- Occupation: Politician

Francisco Manuel Trigoso de Aragão Morato (Lisbon, 17 September 1777 - 11 December 1838), best known as Francisco Trigoso was a Portuguese liberalist politician. He presided over the Portuguese government from 1 August to 6 December 1826.

== Biography ==
Francisco Trigoso was born in Lisbon, and was the son of Francisco Mendo Trigoso Pereira Homem de Magalhães and de Antónia Joaquina Teresa de Sousa Morato. He seemed destined for an ecclesiastical career and did his preparatory studies at the Colégio dos Nobres (Lit. Nobleman's College) from 1790 to 1793, having then enrolled the Canon Law degree at the University of Coimbra. He graduated in 1799 at age 22.

Considered a brilliant student he started his academic career at the University of Coimbra as lente (lit. professor) of law. He published several works about law and history which were, at the time considered of great value.

=== Political career ===
With the advent of liberalism, he was elected to the Cortes Gerais Extraordinárias e Constituintes da Nação Portuguesa (Extraordinary and Constituent General Courts), where he was elected as session president for five times. He also had an important role in the standardization of weights and measurements in Portugal and was a member of the committee tasked with revising the foral laws.

As a consequence of the Vilafrancada he left Lisbon, having returned to participate in the drafting of the Carta Constitucional (Constitutional Charter) which had been promised by John VI of Portugal. The king, however, never signed the Charter into effect. With the beginning of the Miguel of Portugal's reign he once again retired from public life. He would once again return to politics when in July 1833, Lisbon was taken by the liberal troops, commanded by the First Duke of Terceira.

In 1834, with the onset of the liberal regime, he was raised to peerage, by royal decree of 1 September 1834. He was appointed as vice-president of the council on 25 September and began to preside over the sessions due to the Duke of Palmela's sickness. While a member of the Council, he specialised in judiciary matters, such as land right and mortgages and also on ecclesiastical issues.

In 1836, after the September Revolution, he tried, unsuccessfully, to reconcile the positions held by the Cartistas with those of Manuel da Silva Passos, leader of the revolutionaries. At around this time he was in the process of negotiating with the Vatican the normalisation of diplomatic ties with between Portugal and the Roman Catholic Church.

He defined himself as a "conservative liberal of the Vintismo" initially, having in later years been a member of the political group led by Pedro de Sousa Holstein, first Duke of Palmela.

Francisco Trigoso died suddenly in Lisbon on 11 December 1838, at age 61.

=== Other Appointments ===
He held the following positions during his career:

- Lente de Instituições Canónicas na Universidade de Coimbra.
- Commissary of the Escolas e Estudos da Corte e Província da Estremadura (1806);
- Elected vice-secretary of the Academia Real das Ciências de Lisboa (1812);
