= Devourism =

Devourism (Portuguese: Devorismo) was the pejorative term to describe the political regime which established itself in Portugal following the Liberal Wars, particularly during the period from 24 September 1834 to 9 September 1836, while the Constitutional Charter of 1826 was in effect. It was intended to convey a sense of unprincipled greed, whereby leading politicians spent public funds in abundance to secure personal gain for themselves or their associates. The term was coined after a piece of legislation was drafted on 15 April 1835, which provided for the sale of national property and property of the Catholic Church, and facilitated their disposal among leading members of the liberal party.

One of the great reforms of this period was the reform of local administration, which divided the country into seventeen districts on 25 April 1835), also creating three new districts Madeira and the Azores. The position of Civil Governor was established, with postholders choosing mayors, who in turn chose parish commissioners. These reforms, with their substantially centralising effect, were used to steadily remove radicals from positions of power and replace them with those who had favoured the cause of Miguel I and the return of an absolute monarchy.

== Devourist Governments ==
=== First government: Duque de Palmela ===
The first Devourist government took office on the day King Pedro IV died, on 24 September 1834. Led by the Duque de Palmela, it was composed of conservatives and the late king's associates in the Grand Orient of Portugal Masonic lodge. After 28 April 1835, Palmela was succeeded by the Count of Linhares. The members of the government were:

| Ministry | Minister | Term |
| Interior | Francisco de São Luís Saraiva; Agostinho José Freire | 24 September 1834 - 16 February 1835; 16 February 1835 a 27 May 1835 |
| Church Affairs and Justice | António de Barreto Ferraz de Vasconcelos; Manuel Duarte Leitão | 24 September 1834 - 28 April 1835 from 28 April 1835 |
| Finance and Public Administration | José da Silva Carvalho | 24 September 1834 - 27 May 1835 |
| War | Duque da Terceira; Conde de Vila Real | 24 September 1834 - 20 March 1835 from 20 March 1835 |
| Navy and Colonies | Agostinho José Freire; Conde de Vila Real; Vitorio Maria de Sousa Coutinho | 24 September 1834 - 16 February 1835; 16 February 1835 - 28 April 1835 from 28 April 1835 |
| Foreign Affairs | Conde de Vila Real; Duque de Palmela; Conde de Vila Real | 24 September 1834 - 16 February 1835; 16 February 1835 - 28 April 1835 from 28 April 1835 |

=== Second government: Duque de Saldanha ===
The second Devourist government took office on 27 May 1835 and served until 18 November. On assuming the premiership the Duque de Saldanha removed all those described disparagingly by those loyal to the late King Miguel as chamorros (i.e. liberals) and opened up cabinet membership to a wider range of masonic lodges: Francisco António de Campos and Duque de Loulé, more radical members of the Maçonaria do Sul lodge now served alongside José da Silva Carvalho and Rodrigo da Fonseca Magalhães from the Grande Oriente Lusitano as well as Rodrigo da Fonseca Passos Manuel, who named various members of the Maçonaria do Norte, of which Passos Manuel was a member, to positions as civil governors and council administrators.

Saldanha's government fell for two main reasons. The first had to do with a heavily-contested decree of 3 November which auctioned off publicly owned estuarine lands of the Tejo and Sado River. The other was the sending of the Auxiliary Division to Spain at the request of its government to support Isabel II against her uncle Carlos, who was claiming the throne. The members of this government were:

| Ministry | Minister | Term |
| Interior | João de Sousa Pinto de Magalhães; Rodrigo da Fonseca | 27 May 1835 - 15 July 1835; 15 July 1835 - 18 November 1835 |
| Church Affairs and Justice | Manuel António de Carvalho; João de Sousa Pinto de Magalhães | 27 May 1835 - 15 July; 15 July 1835 - 18 November 1835 |
| Public Administration | Francisco António de Campos; José da Silva Carvalho | 27 May 1835 - 15 July 1835; 15 July 1835 - 18 November 1835 |
| War | Duque de Saldanha | 27 May 1835 - 18 November 1835 |
| Navy and Colonies | Duque de Loulé; António Aloísio Jervis de Atouguia | 27 May 1835 - 25 July 1835; 25 July 1835 - 18 November 1835 |
| Foreign Affairs | Duque de Palmela | 27 May 1835 - 18 November 1835 |

=== Third Government: José Jorge Loureiro ===
The third Devourist government took office on 18 November 1835 with Saldanha once again as its leader, until 25 November. It lasted until 20 April 1836. Its stated purpose was to defend ‘morality, the economy and freedom from special interests.’ To demonstrate their commitment, ministers reduced their own salaries by one half, in contrast to the approach of the previous Fonseca administration. The Loureiro government fell following the failure of Finance Minister Francisco António de Campos to secure a majority for his budget. The government was composed of:

| Ministry | Minister | Term |
| Interior | Sá da Bandeira; Luís da Silva Mouzinho de Albuquerque | 18–25 November 1835; 25 November 1835 |
| Church Affairs and Justice | Manuel António Velez Caldeira Castelo Branco | 18 November 1835 - 20 April 1836 |
| Finance and Public Administration | Francisco António de Campos; José Jorge Loureiro | 18 November 1835 - 6 April 1836 from 6 April 1836 |
| War | José Jorge Loureiro | from 6 April 1836 |
| Navy and the Colonies | Sá da Bandeira | 18 November 1835 - 20 April 1836 |
| Foreign Affairs | Marquês de Loulé | 18 November 1835 - 20 April 1836 |

=== Fourth Government: Duque da Terceira ===
The fourth and final government was led by the Duque da Terceira, and lasted from 20 April to 9 September 1836. It was essentially aristocratic in composition, characterised as chamorro and full of palmelistas, and dominated once again by the Grand Orient Lodge.

Among the measures it took was the closing down of the radical leftist Sociedade Patriótica Lisbonense. To improve security it created a Municipal Guard for Porto and strengthened the Municipal Guard in Lisbon. When arson destroyed the Royal Exchequer, it was assumed that the government itself was responsible, seeking to conceal its misspending.

The Devourist period came to an end in September 1836 with the September Revolution. The opposition representatives from the north of the country arrived in Lisbon on 9 September, prompting a popular revolt which the National Guard joined. On 11 September the Duque da Terceira resigned, and the Queen took an oath to the Constitution of 1822. This was the start of “Setembrismo.” The ministers of the Terceira government were:

| Ministry | Minister | Term |
| Interior | Agostinho José Freire | 20 April - 9 September 1836 |
| Justice | Joaquim António de Aguiar | 20 April - 9 September 1836 |
| Finance and Public Affairs | José da Silva Carvalho | 20 April - 9 September 1836 |
| War | Duque da Terceira | 20 April - 9 September 1836 |
| Navy | Manuel Gonçalves de Miranda | 20 April - 9 September 1836 |
| Foreign Affairs | José Luís de Sousa Botelho Mourão e Vasconcelos | 20 April - 9 September 1836 |
