= Belfastada =

Belfastada is the name given to the military uprising against the Miguelist regime in Portugal as part of the Liberal Wars, that was triggered off in June and July 1828 in Porto, with the landing of a group of liberal exiles coming in from England aboard the Belfast ship (hence the name given to the event).

The leaders of the expedition were Pedro de Sousa Holstein and João Carlos de Saldanha.
This liberal offensive was unsuccessful, so the Liberals were forced to take refuge on the ship and go back to England.

== Background ==
After the Napoleonic War, the British ruled Portugal in the name of the absent king who was in Brazil, with Beresford as the de facto Regent, until the Liberal Revolution of 1820 when they were driven out and the king was forced to return as a constitutional monarch.

Over the next 25 years the fledgling Portuguese democracy experienced several military upheavals, especially the Liberal Wars fought between the brothers Dom Pedro, ex-Emperor of Brazil and King Dom Miguel.

Dom Miguel controlled the Portuguese mainland from 1828 until 1832.

To assert the cause of his daughter Maria da Glória, Pedro sailed in 1832 from Terceira in the Azores with an expeditionary force consisting of 60 vessels and 7500 men, mostly mercenaries.

Meanwhile, Miguel's fleet was comprehensively defeated by Pedro's much smaller squadron, commanded by Charles Napier, in the fourth Battle of Cape St. Vincent (1833).

The Miguelites were driven out of Lisbon but returned and attacked the city in force, unsuccessfully. Miguel was finally defeated at the Battle of Asseiceira, on 16 May 1834, and capitulated a few days later with the Concession of Evoramonte.

Despite his forced exile, many Portuguese continued to fight for his cause up until the 1850s.

== Timeline ==
- Liberal revolt in Porto (1828)
- Belfastada (1828)
- Revolt of the Royal Navy Brigade (1829)
- Revolt of Lisbon (1831)
- Revolt of the 2nd Infantry Regiment (1831)
- Siege of Porto and civil war (1832–33)
