= José Jorge Loureiro =

Portuguese soldier and politician

His Excellency General José Jorge Loureiro GCL GCIC FC
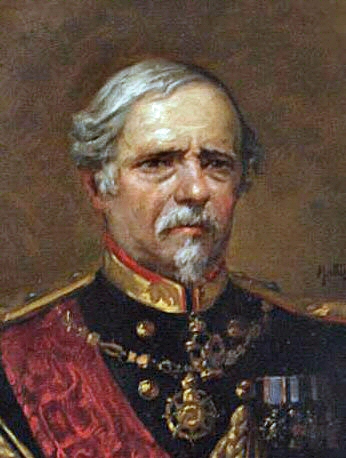

Prime Minister of Portugal
- In office 18 November 1835 – 19 April 1836
- Monarch: Maria II of Portugal
- Preceded by: Duke of Saldanha
- Succeeded by: Duke of Terceira

Minister of Finance of Portugal
- Interim; 6 April – 20 April 1836
- Monarchs: Maria II and Fernando II
- Prime Minister: Himself
- Preceded by: Francisco António de Campos
- Succeeded by: José da Silva Carvalho

Minister of the Navy and Overseas of Portugal
- In office 9 February – 24 February 1842
- Monarchs: Maria II and Fernando II
- Prime Minister: António José Severim de Noronha, 1st Duke of Terceira
- Preceded by: Provisional Governing Junta
- Succeeded by: António José Campelo

Minister of War of Portugal
- In office 18 November 1835 – 19 April 1836
- Monarchs: Maria II and Fernando II
- Prime Minister: Bernardo de Sá Nogueira de Figueiredo, 1st Marquis of Sá da Bandeira
- Preceded by: João Carlos de Saldanha Oliveira e Daun, 1st Duke of Saldanha
- Succeeded by: António José Severim de Noronha, 1st Duke of Terceira
- Interim; 26 May – 19 July 1846
- Monarchs: Maria II and Fernando II
- Prime Minister: Pedro de Sousa Holstein, 1st Duke of Palmela
- Preceded by: António José Severim de Noronha, 1st Duke of Terceira
- Succeeded by: Bernardo de Sá Nogueira de Figueiredo, 1st Marquis of Sá da Bandeira
- In office 6 June 1856 – 23 January 1857
- Monarch: Pedro V
- Prime Minister: Nuno José Severo de Mendoça Rolim de Moura Barreto, 1st Duke of Loulé
- Preceded by: João Carlos de Saldanha Oliveira e Daun, 1st Duke of Saldanha

Personal details
- Born: 23 April 1791 Lisbon, Kingdom of Portugal
- Died: 1 June 1860 (aged 69) Lisbon, Kingdom of PortugaL
- Parent(s): Domingos Gomes Loureiro (father); Ana Isabel Joaquina de Loureiro (mother)

Military service
- Allegiance: Kingdom of Portugal
- Branch/service: Portuguese Army
- Years of service: 1809–1856
- Rank: General
- Battles/wars: Peninsula War

José Jorge Loureiro (23 April 1791 – 1 June 1860) was a Portuguese soldier and politician at the time of the monarchy.

== Career ==
He was studying law at the University of Coimbra when the Invasion of Portugal began, which prompted him to join the academic battalion.

He served as finance minister and from 18 November 1835 to 19 April 1836 he was Prime Minister of Portugal.

== See also ==
- Devorismo

Political offices
Preceded by Duke of Saldanha	Prime Minister of Portugal; 1835-1836	Succeeded by Duke of Terceira
