= Simão da Silva Ferraz de Lima e Castro =

Portuguese diplomat and politician (1795–1857)

1st Baron and Count of Rendufe Simão da Silva Ferraz de Lima e Castro
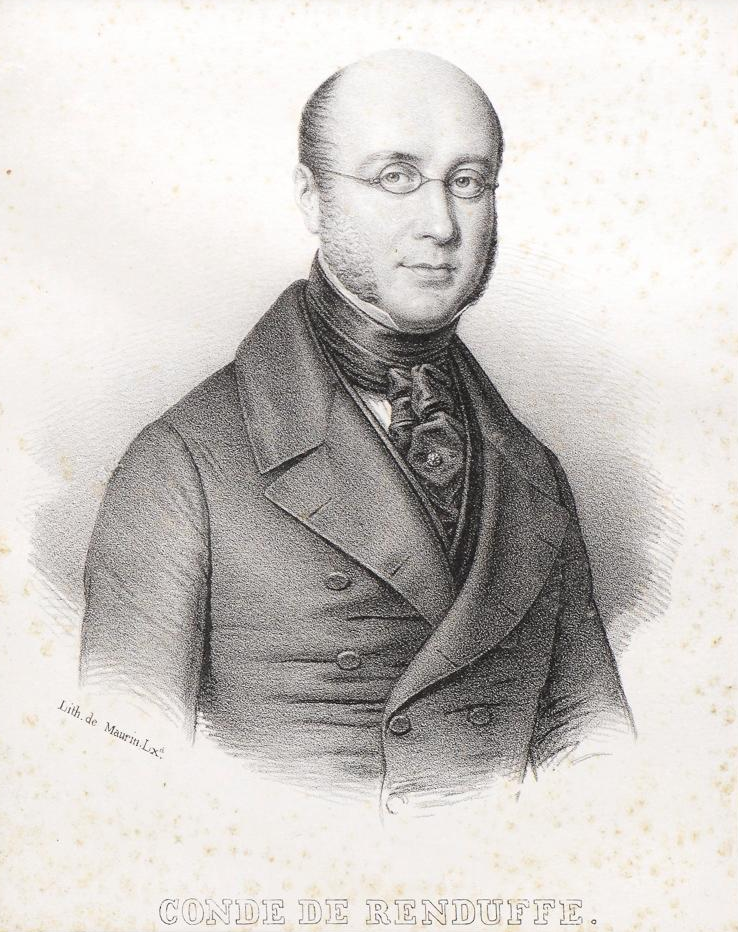
- Born: 13 May 1795; Porto
- Died: 16 January 1857 (aged 61); Brussels
- Education: University of Coimbra
- Occupation: Diplomat

Simão da Silva Ferraz de Lima e Castro (Porto, 13 May 1795 – Brussels, 16 January 1857), 1st Baron of Rendufe and 1st Count of Rendufe, was a Portuguese diplomat and politician.

== Early life ==
Son of Tomás da Silva Ferraz, Young Nobleman of the Royal House, Commander of the Order of Christ, 1st President of the Senate of the Porto Council from October 26, 1822 to 4 of June 1823, being the first to be elected in the liberal regime, and his wife Ana Amélia de Lima e Castro, younger brother of Agostinho Tomás and Maria Urbana and older brother of Tomás António.

He graduated in Law from the Faculty of Law of the University of Coimbra, in 1821 he was appointed Magistrate of the Neighborhood of Rossio, in Lisbon.

== Vilafrancada ==
In 1823 he spoke out in favor of Vilafrancada, which earned him the appointment of Intendant-General of the Police of the Court and Kingdom and elevation to His Most Faithful Majesty's Council. With Liberal tendencies, he was accused by his supporters of having made an agreement with the enemies of the representative system but, in the performance of his role as Intendant-General, he helped many Liberals who were persecuted by the extreme right-wing party that surrounded Queen D. Carlota Joaquina de Bourbon and the then Infante D. Miguel.

== Abrilada ==
When D. Miguel's coup d'état took place, in April 1824, da Silva Ferraz, who was aware of what was being plotted, went, accompanied by the 1st Baron da Portela, through the mutinous barracks of Lisbon but, when he went to the Bemposta Palace to inform D. João VI of Portugal of what was happening, he found it already surrounded by D. Miguel's forces. Anticipating the need to remain in homage until the Sovereign resumed his prerogatives, he went to the General Intendency, in order to destroy all the political papers there so that they should not fall into the hands of the enemy, and sought refuge in the house of the Minister of Russia, who was then in São Pedro de Alcântara. One of the most exalted Miguelists, Alquilador Troca, perfidiously offered him asylum at his home, but as soon as the Intendant-General entered his house, he rushed to report the case to D. Miguel, who immediately had him arrested and taken to the Queluz Palace. There he was tied to the trunk of a tree and subjected to a simulacrum of shooting (discharge without bullets), preceded and followed by all sorts of pressure to get him to confess what had happened between the King, the Ministers of foreign Nations and himself in anticipation of the Infante's coup d'état. Having revealed nothing, he was sent to a dungeon in the Fort of São Julião da Barra, where he remained until D. João VI of Portugal returned to Bemposta. He was reinstated in public service, with the high position of Advisor to the Privy Council, with the status of Knight nobleman of the Royal House and awarded the title of 1st Baron of Rendufe, a title granted to him by Decree of D. João VI of Portugal of October 25, 1824.

== Portuguese Civil War ==
After the Sovereign's death, he resigned from his position as Intendant-General and, in 1827, was appointed Attache, without a salary, at the Legation of Portugal in the Netherlands. Upon the acclamation of D. Miguel I of Portugal, the 1st Baron of Rendufe immediately spoke out in favor of the cause of D. Maria II of Portugal and the Constitutional Charter of 1826, and was entrusted with diplomatic missions to several Courts to obtain recognition from the Queen. Once these were completed, he came to join the defenders of the constitutional throne in the Azores and disembarked with them in Mindelo. From Porto he was again sent by the Government of D. Pedro IV of Portugal to further diplomatic efforts abroad. He 'served as a private soldier and was present in all severe actions as well as in many a cold winter's picket night', 'doing honour to his nobility'.

== Beginning of Liberalism ==
In 1834, after returning and having supporting the constitutional party, he was elected Deputy to the Cortes of 1834, for the Province of Trás-os-Montes and Alto Douro. At the session of the Chamber of Deputies, on August 26, 1834, he raised the issue of the protests made by D. Miguel I of Portugal, in exile, on June 20 of the same year, against the stipulations of the Évoramonte Concession. In the session held the following day, he proposed the application of the death penalty to the deposed Sovereign, if he returned to the Country, in accordance with the Law previously promulgated by the Courts against crimes of treason to the nation. He was named Peer of the Realm by Decree of October 1, 1835.

== Minister Plenipotentiary ==
On October 4, 1841, he was appointed Minister Plenipotentiary in Berlin, where he remained in office from February 25, 1842 until November 24, 1845. During part of the time of this mission, he was simultaneously accredited to the Court of the Duchy of Saxe-Coburg. During the aforementioned functions, he was invested with the powers to negotiate Trade and Navigation Treaties between the Portuguese Government and that of the Kingdom of Prussia where he published the work 'Memória sobre a Organización Antiga e Moderna do Army Prussiano' (Lisbon, 1844). He was transferred to Madrid as Minister Plenipotentiary, and remained in this Court until December 30, 1846. He was one of the negotiators, on the part of the Government of D. Maria II of Portugal, to promote the Anglo-Franco-Spanish intervention that put an end to the uprising in Maria da Fonte and gave origin of the signing of the Convention of Gramido. He was still in Madrid when he was appointed to Rio de Janeiro, in the Empire of Brazil, a commission he did not take up, as, upon coming to Lisbon, he was offered the position of Minister of Foreign Affairs, which he refused, and, May 11, 1847, he was appointed Minister of Portugal in Paris. There he remained in office until January 23, 1848, under the Government of Louis Philippe I of France. He then became available. He was then made Commander of the Royal Military Order of Our Lady of Conception of Vila Viçosa and decorated with the Grand Cross of the Royal Military Order of Our Lord Jesus Christ. Retired, he married in Brussels on April 10, 1849, Émérence de Boudry des Viviers, daughter of Jean-Baptiste de Boudry, Seigneur des Viviers et de Rhône, in France, and his wife, without children. Finally, he was elevated to Grandee, as 1st Count of Rendufe, by Decree of D. Maria II of Portugal of October 13, 1852.

== Illegitimate children ==
Based on sparse documentation, oral testimonies and historical research as well as according to the family tradition of those from Espírito Santo family, he was the father of José Maria do Espírito Santo Silva (who added the surname Silva for this reason), allegedly born to his servant and goddaughter, Maria Angelina Saraiva.

== Honours ==
Country	Appointment
Kingdom of Portugal	Peer and Grandee of the realm
Kingdom of Portugal	His Most Faithful Majesty's Council.
Kingdom of Portugal	Grand Cross of the Order of Christ
Kingdom of Portugal	Grand Cross of the Order of the Immaculate Conception
Kingdom of Prussia	Grand Cross of the Order of the Red Eagle
Kingdom of Saxony	Grand Cross of the Saxon Order of Merit
Dutchy of Saxe-Coburg and Gotha	Grand Cross of the Saxe Ernstine House Order
Grand Duchy of Saxe-Weimar-Eisenach	Grand Cross of the Order of the White Falcon
Grand Duchy of Hesse	Grand Cross of the Order of Ludwig
Duchy of Brunswick	Grand Cross of the Order of Henry the Lion
Duchy of Anhalt-Dessau	Grand Cross of the Order of Albert the Bear
Grand Duchy of Baden	Grand Cross of the Order of the Zähringer Lion
Kingdom of Württemberg	Grand Cross of the Order of Friedrich
Grand Duchy of Oldenburg	Grand Cross of the Oldenburg House and Merit Order
Grand Duchy of Hesse and by Rhine	Grand Cross of the House Order of the Golden Lion
Kingdom of Bavaria	Knight Commander of the Order of St Michael
Kingdom of Spain	Grand Cross of the Order of Charles III
Kingdom of Spain	Grand Cross of the Order of Isabella the Catholic
Ottoman Empire	Grand Cordon (?) of the Order of Glory
