= Joaquim António de Aguiar =

Prime Minister of Portugal (1792–1884)

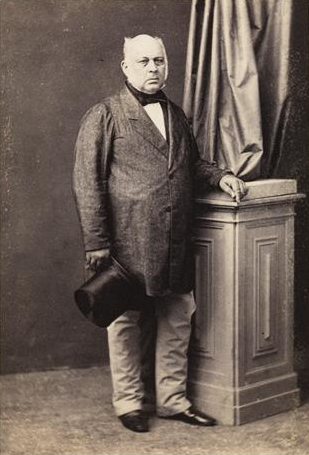

Prime Minister of Portugal
- In office 4 September 1865 – 4 January 1868
- Monarch: Luís I
- Preceded by: Marquis of Sá da Bandeira
- Succeeded by: Duke of Ávila
- In office 1 May 1860 – 4 July 1860
- Monarch: Pedro V
- Preceded by: Duke of Terceira
- Succeeded by: Duke of Loulé
- In office 9 June 1841 – 7 February 1842
- Monarchs: Maria II and Fernando II
- Preceded by: Count of Bonfim
- Succeeded by: Marquis of Palmela

Personal details
- Born: 24 August 1792 Coimbra, Kingdom of Portugal
- Died: 26 May 1884 (aged 91) Lisbon, Kingdom of Portugal
- Party: Regenerator Party; Progressist

Joaquim António de Aguiar (Coimbra, 24 August 1792 – Lisbon, 26 May 1884) was a Portuguese freemason and politician. He held several relevant political posts during the Portuguese constitutional monarchy, namely as leader of the Cartists and later of the Partido Regenerador (English: Regenerator Party). He was three times prime minister of Portugal: between 1841 and 1842, in 1860 and finally from 1865 to 1868, when he entered a coalition with the Partido Progressista (English: Progressive Party), in what became known as the Governo de Fusão (English: Fusion Government).

He also served as minister of justice during the regency of Peter IV and in that capacity issued the 30 May 1834 law which extinguished "all convents, monasteries, colleges, hospices and any other houses of the regular religious orders". Their vast patrimony was taken over by the Portuguese State and incorporated into the Fazenda Nacional (the National Exchequer). This law and its anti-ecclesiastical spirit earned Joaquim António de Aguiar the nickname "O Mata-Frades" (English: "The Friar-Killer").

== See also ==
- Dissolution of the monasteries in Portugal

Political offices
Preceded by José Travassos Valdez, Count of Bonfim	Prime Minister of Portugal (President of the Council of Ministers); 1841–1842	Succeeded by Pedro de Sousa Holstein, Marquis of Palmela
Preceded by António Severim de Noronha; Marquis of Vila Flor	Prime Minister of Portugal (President of the Council of Ministers); 1860	Succeeded by Nuno José de Moura Barreto, Duke of Loulé
Preceded by Bernardo de Sá Nogueira de Figueiredo, Marquis of Sá da Bandeira	Prime Minister of Portugal (President of the Council of Ministers); 1865–1868	Succeeded by António José de Ávila, Count of Ávila
