= Vitório Maria de Sousa Coutinho, 2nd Count of Linhares =

Portuguese statesman

His Excellency The Count of Linhares CC GCTS CSML FC
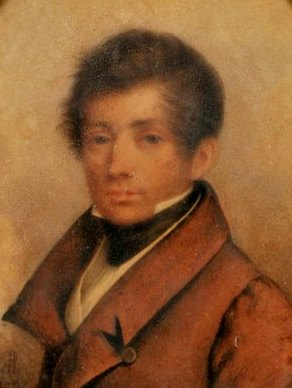

Prime Minister of Portugal
- In office 4 May 1835 – 27 May 1835
- Monarch: Maria II of Portugal
- Preceded by: Duke of Palmela
- Succeeded by: Duke of Saldanha

Personal details
- Born: 25 June 1790 Turin, Kingdom of Sardinia
- Died: 29 July 1857 (aged 67) Lisbon, Kingdom of Portugal
- Spouse: Catarina Juliana de Sousa Holstein

D. Vitório Maria Francisco de Sousa Coutinho Teixeira de Andrade Barbosa, second Count of Linhares (25 June 1790 – 29 July 1857) was a Portuguese politician and the second prime minister of Portugal.

== Career ==
Vitório Maria Francisco de Sousa Coutinho Teixeira de Andrade Barbosatook part in the campaigns in Rio da Prata.

In 1817 was nominated Extraordinary Envoie and Minister at Turin.

In 1835 he took part of the ministry, being in charge of the Portuguese Navy.

In May, he became the second Portuguese prime minister.

He was part of the Câmara dos Pares (Chamber of Peers) in Saint Benedict's Parliament.

Political offices
Preceded by Duke of Palmela	Prime Minister of Portugal; 1835	Succeeded by Duke of Saldanha
Preceded by Viscount of Santarém	Minister of the Navy Armada of the Kingdom of Portugal and the Algarves; 1835	Succeeded by Manuel Gorjão Henriques
Preceded by Rodrigo de Sousa Coutinho	Portuguese Ambassador to the Kingdom of Sardinia; 1817	Succeeded by Rodrigo de Sousa Coutinho
Portuguese nobility
Preceded by Rodrigo de Sousa Coutinho	Count of Linhares; 1812—1857	Succeeded by Rodrigo de Sousa Coutinho
