= Cartista =

Chartists Cartistas
- Historical leaders: The Duke of Palmela, The Duke of Terceira, The Marquis of Tomar, The Duke of Saldanha
- Founded: 1834
- Dissolved: 1851
- Succeeded by: Regenerator Party
- Headquarters: Lisbon
- Ideology: Royalism; Constitutionalism; Liberal conservatism
- Political position: Centre-right

Cartismo was a Portuguese ideology which arose after the Portuguese Liberal Revolution of 1820. Adherents, called cartistas, supported the Constitutional Charter of 1826 granted by Peter IV of Portugal, which was an attempt to reduce the conflicts created by the revolution. This was a less radical charter than the Constitution of 1822. Portuguese Chartism was quite different from both European and British Chartism, and was in some ways antithetical, as they believed in a liberal-conservative ideology. A scathing contemporary description defined them as either personal enemies of Dom Miguel, or were simply acting out of self-interest. By 1851, the Chartists successfully carried out a military coup against Costa Cabral. The party became part of a power-sharing agreement with Partido Progressista, which became the basis of the system of "rotativism", where they took turns ruling Portugal.

== Background ==
Following the Peninsular War, when the monarchy had remained transplanted in Brazil and continental Portugal was run by British-supported elites, pressure developed from professional classes to obtain more power, in light of their rule from abroad. Outward pressure eventually resulted in the 1820 Revolution, which established a Liberal constitution, investing power in the political structures and turning Portugal into a constitutional monarchy. King John VI of Portugal returned to the continent and supported this form of government, although during his reign there were pressures from the old elites, such as the multiple attempts by his son Miguel of Portugal to overthrow the established Liberal constitution.

The death of John VI, and the abdication of his successor, Peter IV of Portugal in favour of his young daughter (Maria da Glória), once again, allowed Miguel an opportunity to seize the throne. Ultimately, this led to a war between the Chartists (supported by Peter VI) and the absolutist king (Miguel). Following the Concession of Evoramonte, which put an end to the Liberal Wars, two political factions developed, becoming more and more distinct: the conservative Chartists and the Vintistas, which were further to the left of liberal thought.

In its early years, the Chartist party was considered the most unpopular party in Portugal. Historical accounts showed that it was far weaker than the Royalists. A scathing contemporary description, for instance, stated that "it is composed generally of men who were either personal enemies to Dom Miguel, or were bought by money, or else act from motives of self-interest at the moment... it is neither respected, looked up to, nor beloved." The Chartists, however, effectively influenced the form of the Portuguese government later on.

Following the restoration of the Charter, the Chartists came to power several times (under several different names), battling against various internal conflicts and counter-revolutions, such as the Patuleia and the Revolution of Maria da Fonte. During the reign of Queen Maria II, there were reports that she was increasingly leaning towards the Chartist party, particularly in 1847. She eventually sided with Costa Cabral, who was a former radical turned Chartist, giving him sweeping power. This development attested to the relevance of the party in the Portuguese polity during her reign.

By 1851, the Chartists - through the leadership of the Duke of Saldanha - successfully carried out a military coup against Cabral. The party became part of a power-sharing agreement with Partido Progressista thereafter. This agreement became the basis of the system of "rotativism" where the Chartist and Partido Progressista leaders took turn ruling Portugal.

== Regeneration ==
When the formation of political parties was clarified as a result of the Regeneração, the Cartistas re-formed in 1851 as the "Partido Regenerador", which up to the advent of the Republic in Portugal was the main conservative party of the right of the Constitutional Monarchy. More than half of Portugal's presidents of the council of the second half of the 19th century belonged to this political party.

== Factionalism ==
A faction of 25 led by João Franco, opposing Hintze Ribeiro's leadership of the main party, formally broke away on 12 February 1901, and became the Partido Regenerador Liberal (officially called the Centro Regenerador Liberal) on 16 May that year.

== European Chartism ==
Despite the resemblance of its name and some of its objectives, Portuguese "cartismo" is not directly equivalent to European chartism, since the letter it defended (the Constitutional Letter of 1826) was a charter that had been granted to the Portuguese in particular, rather than the generic charter of rights aspired to by European chartism. Indeed, it itself attacked the wishes of European chartism, particularly British Chartism, closer to the resolutions of the Portuguese Constitution of 1822 than those of the Portuguese Constitutional Charter.

== See also ==
- Belenzada
- Cabralism
- Chartism in general
- Setembrismo, the anti-Cartista party
