= João Carlos de Saldanha Oliveira e Daun, 1st Duke of Saldanha =

Portuguese marshal and statesman

His Excellency Marshal João Carlos de Saldanha Oliveira e Daun 1st The Duke of Saldanha GCSMOM GCC GCTS GSJS GCICVV FC
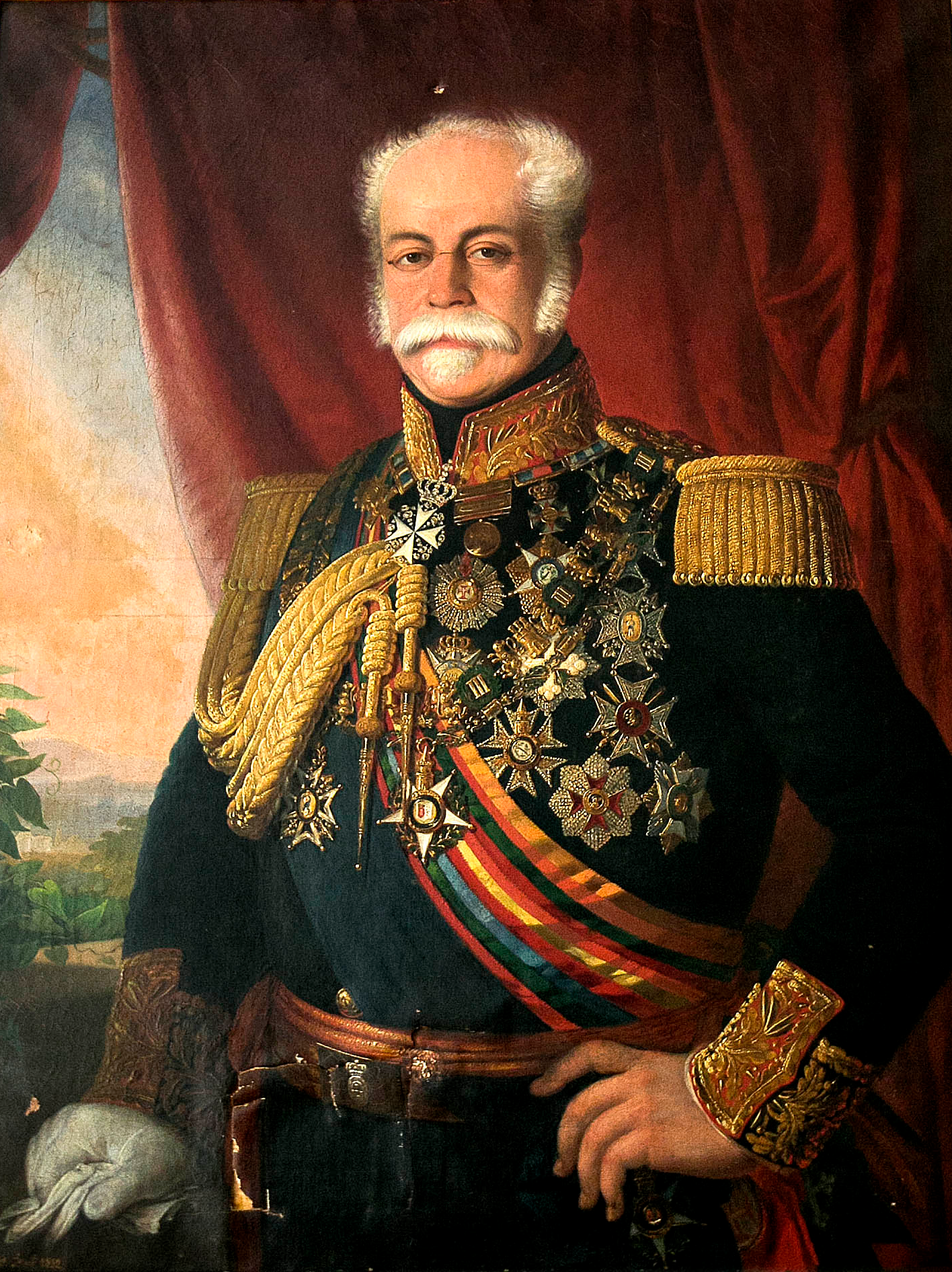
- Portrait of the Duke of Saldanha, hung at Dr. Miguel Bombarda's old office at Miguel Bombarda Hospital

Prime Minister of Portugal
- In office 19 May 1870 – 29 August 1870
- Monarch: Luís I
- Preceded by: Duke of Loulé
- Succeeded by: Marquis of Sá da Bandeira
- In office 1 May 1851 – 6 June 1856
- Monarchs: Maria II and Fernando II
- Preceded by: Duke of Terceira
- Succeeded by: Duke of Loulé
- In office 6 October 1846 – 18 June 1849
- Monarchs: Maria II and Fernando II
- Preceded by: Duke of Palmela
- Succeeded by: Marquess of Tomar
- In office 27 May 1835 – 18 November 1835
- Monarch: Maria II
- Preceded by: Count of Linhares
- Succeeded by: José Jorge Loureiro

President of the Rio Grande do Sul Province
- In office 22 February 1822 – 29 August 1822
- Monarch: João VI
- Minister of State: Filipe Ferreira de Araújo e Castro
- Succeeded by: Viscount of São Gabriel

Captain-General of the Rio Grande do Sul Province
- In office 20 August 1821 – 22 February 1822
- Monarch: João VI
- Minister of State: Filipe Ferreira de Araújo e Castro
- Preceded by: Antônio Rodrigues da Costa

Minister of War of Portugal
- In office 1 August – 13 October 1826
- Monarch: Miguel I
- Minister of State: Francisco Manuel Trigoso
- Preceded by: Francisco Furtado de Castro do Rio de Mendonça e Faro
- Succeeded by: Inácio da Costa Quintela
- In office 1 May – 26 July 1827
- Monarch: Miguel I
- Minister of State: Manuel Francisco de Barros e Sousa de Mesquita de Macedo Leitão e Carvalhosa
- Preceded by: Cândido José Xavier
- Succeeded by: Manuel de Saldanha da Gama e Torres Guedes de Brito
- In office 27 May – 18 November 1835
- Monarch: Maria II
- Prime Minister: Himself
- Preceded by: José Luis de Sousa
- Succeeded by: José Jorge Loureiro
- Not sworn it 26 May – 19 July 1846 Serving with José Jorge Loureiro (as interim)
- Monarchs: Maria II and Fernando II
- Prime Minister: Pedro de Sousa Holstein, 1st Duke of Palmela
- Preceded by: António José Severim de Noronha, 1st Duke of Terceira
- Succeeded by: Bernardo de Sá Nogueira de Figueiredo, 1st Marquis of Sá da Bandeira
- In office 6 October – 4 November 1846
- Monarchs: Maria II and Fernando II
- Prime Minister: Himself
- Preceded by: Bernardo de Sá Nogueira de Figueiredo, 1st Marquis of Sá da Bandeira
- Succeeded by: José António Maria de Sousa Azevedo (as interim)
- Interim; 18 December 1847 – 8 January 1848
- Monarchs: Maria II and Fernando II
- Prime Minister: Himself
- Preceded by: António José da Silva Leão
- Succeeded by: Fernando da Fonseca Mesquita e Sola
- Interim; 17 May 1851 – 6 June 1856
- Monarchs: Maria II and Fernando II; Pedro V
- Prime Minister: Himself
- Preceded by: Fernando da Fonseca Mesquita e Sola
- Succeeded by: José Jorge Loureiro
- In office 19 May – 29 August 1870
- Monarch: Luís I
- Prime Minister: Himself
- Preceded by: Joaquim Tomás Lobo de Ávila (as interim)
- Succeeded by: Bernardo de Sá Nogueira de Figueiredo, 1st Marquis of Sá da Bandeira

Minister of Foreign Affairs of Portugal
- Not sworn it
- In office 20 May – 26 May 1846 Serving with António José Severim de Noronha, 1st Duke of Terceira (as interim)
- Monarchs: Maria II and Fernando II
- Prime Minister: Pedro de Sousa Holstein, 1st Duke of Palmela
- Preceded by: José Joaquim Gomes de Castro
- Succeeded by: Francisco de Almeida Portugal

Ambassador of Portugal to the United Kingdom
- In office 28 November 1870 – 21 November 1876
- Monarch: Luís I
- Prime Minister: António José de Ávila; Fontes Pereira de Melo
- Minister of Foreign Affairs: António José de Ávila; João de Andrade Corvo
- Preceded by: Viscount of Seisal
- Succeeded by: Henrique Teixeira de Sampaio

Personal details
- Born: 17 November 1790 Lisbon, Kingdom of Portugal
- Died: 20 November 1876 (aged 86) London, United Kingdom
- Spouse(s): Maria Theresa Margaret Horan FitzGerald (1814–1855); Charlotte Elisabeth Mary Smith-Athelston (since 1856)
- Relations: Sebastião José de Carvalho e Melo, 1st Marquis of Pombal (grandfather)
- Parent(s): João Vicente de Saldanha Oliveira e Sousa Juzarte Figueira (father); Maria Amália de Carvalho Daun (mother)

Military service
- Allegiance: Kingdom of Portugal
- Branch/service: Portuguese Army
- Years of service: 1805–1876
- Rank: Marshal
- Battles/wars: Peninsula War; Liberal Wars

João Carlos Gregório Domingos Vicente Francisco de Saldanha Oliveira e Daun, 1st Duke of Saldanha (17 November 1790 – 20 November 1876; Portuguese pronunciation: [salˈdɐɲɐ]) was a Portuguese marshal and statesman.

== Early life and schooling ==
Saldanha was born on 17 November 1790, in Azinhaga. He was a grandson of Sebastião José de Carvalho e Melo, 1st Marquis of Pombal, the Secretary of the State of the Kingdom of Portugal and the Algarves to King Joseph I of Portugal.

Saldanha studied at Coimbra, served against the French, and was made a prisoner in 1810. On his release he went to Brazil, where he was employed in the military and diplomatic services. He returned to Portugal after the declaration of the independence of Brazil.

== Liberal Wars ==
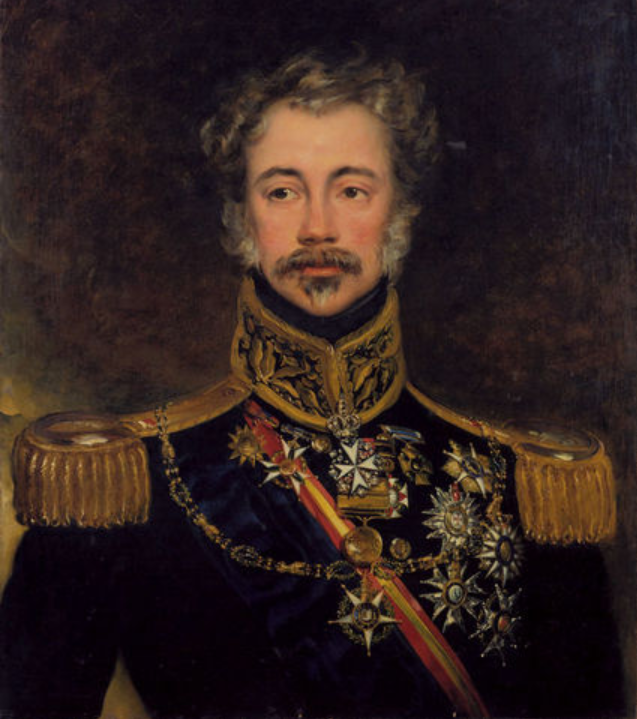
Saldanha between 1834 and 1847, by John Simpson

The Duke of Saldanha, as he is commonly known, was one of the most dominating personalities of war and politics in Portugal, from the revolution of 1820 to his death in 1876. During that period he led no less than seven coups d'état. He played an important part in the struggle between brothers Pedro IV of Portugal (I of Brazil) and Miguel of Portugal during the Liberal Wars.

Saldanha became Minister of Foreign Affairs in 1825 and was governor of Porto in 1826–27. He joined Dom Pedro against Dom Miguel. He fought in the Belfastada, the Siege of Porto and Battle of Almoster. In 1833, he was rewarded with the title of Marshal of Portugal and one year later, he concluded the Concession of Evoramonte with the defeated Dom Miguel.
In 1835 he was made Minister of War and President of the Council but resigned the same year. After the revolution of 1836, which he had instigated he went into exile until recalled in 1846.

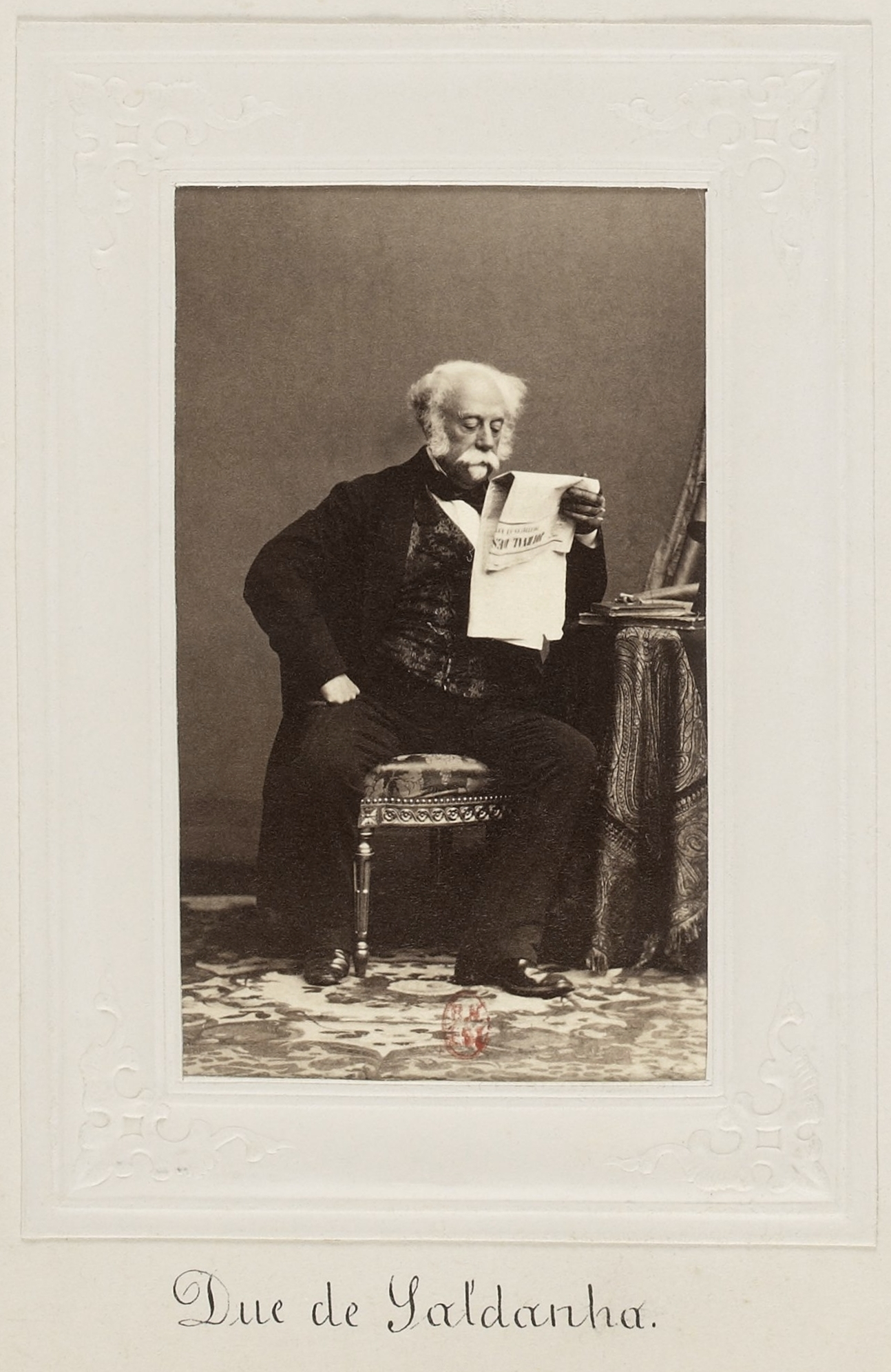
Duke of Saldanha, ca. 1870

== Later life ==
After his return from exile in 1846 Saldanha was made Duke of Saldanha, and formed a Ministry which fell in 1849. In 1851 he organized a new revolt and became chief Minister as the leader of a coalition party formed of Septembrists and dissatisfied Chartists. He remained in power until the accession of Pedro V. in 1856. and was subsequently Minister to Rome (1862–64 and 1866–69). He became Prime Minister once more for a few months in 1870 (May–August), and was sent in 1871 to London as Ambassador, where he died.

== Assessment ==
Terence Hughes wrote a character sketch of Saldanha in 1846:

The Marshal Duke de Saldanha ... is a very noble-looking old soldier, whose appearance, manners, and accomplishments would do honour to any noblesse in Europe. His hair, moustache, and whiskers, which he wears rather full, are as white as snow and contrast extremely well with the soldiery brown of his complexion. His nose is a little blunt, but his mouth is benevolent, his eyes bright and expressive, and his forehead expansive. He is about the middle height, and has an easy and gentlemanly figure—remarkably upright for a man who must be at least sixty-two years of age.

The Duke is equally distinguished in arms and diplomacy, having served during the entire Peninsular War, and subsequently took an active part in the war against Dom Miguel. He is by far the ablest general in Portugal, and about the eminence of his strategic talents there is no dispute whatever.

... He is said to be descended from the famous Bernardo del Carpio, whose father was the Conde de Saldana. ....

— Terence Hughes.

== Works ==
Saldanha was an accomplished linguist (he spoke English, French, and German with perfect fluency) and a general scholar. He wrote On the Connexion between true Sciences and Revealed Religion which was published in Berlin.

== Family ==
Saldanha had a son who died in Berlin in 1845.

== See also ==
- Devorismo
- Revolt of the Marshals

== Notes ==
Political offices
Preceded by Duke of Loulé	Prime Minister of Portugal; 1870	Succeeded by Marquis of Sá da Bandeira
Preceded by Duke of Terceira	Prime Minister of Portugal; 1851–1856	Succeeded by Duke of Loulé
Preceded by Duke of Palmela	Prime Minister of Portugal; 1846–1849	Succeeded by Count of Tomar
Preceded by Count of Linhares	Prime Minister of Portugal; 1835	Succeeded by José Jorge Loureiro
Preceded by Himself as captain-general	President of Rio Grande do Sul; 1822	Succeeded by Viscount of São Gabriel
Preceded by Antônio Rodrigues da Costa	Captain-General of Rio Grande do Sul; 1821–1822	Succeeded by Himself as provincial president
Portuguese nobility
New title	Duke of Saldanha; 1846–1876	Succeeded by João Carlos Saldanha de Oliveira Daun
New title	Marquis of Saldanha; 1834–1876	Succeeded by João Carlos Saldanha de Oliveira Daun
New title	Count of Saldanha; 1833–1876	Succeeded by João Carlos Saldanha de Oliveira Daun
