= Duke of Saldanha =

Portuguese title

Ducal House of Saldanha
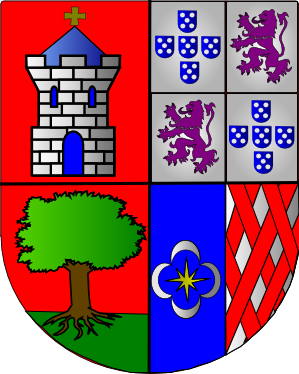
- Country: Portugal
- Founded: 1834
- Founder: D. João Carlos de Saldanha Oliveira e Daun, 1st Count-Duke of Saldanha
- Current head: D. João Carlos Duarte de Saldanha Oliveira e Daun, 6th Count-Duke of Saldanha
- Titles: Duke of Saldanha; Marquis of Saldanha; Count of Saldanha; Count of Almoster
- Estate: of Portugal

Count-Duke of Saldanha (in Portuguese: Conde-Duque de Saldanha) is a Portuguese title granted by royal decree of Queen Maria II of Portugal, dated November 4, 1846, to João Carlos Saldanha de Oliveira Daun (1790-1876), also known as Marshal Saldanha, leader of the liberal armies, during the Liberal Wars in Portugal.

Queen Maria II of Portugal had successively upgraded the Marshal Saldanha title from Count (1833), to Marquis (1834) and, finally, to Duke of Saldanha (1846).

== List of dukes of Saldanha ==
1. D. João Carlos de Saldanha Oliveira e Daun (1790-1876)
2. D. João Carlos (II) de Saldanha Oliveira e Daun (1825-1880)
3. D. João Carlos (III) de Saldanha Oliveira e Daun (1889-1954)
4. D. José Augusto de Saldanha Oliveira e Daun (1894-1970)
5. D. José Augusto (II) de Saldanha Oliveira e Daun (1921-2011)
6. D. João Carlos (IV) Duarte de Saldanha Oliveira e Daun (1947-)

== Other titles ==
The Duke of Saldanha also holds the following titles:

- Count of Saldanha, by decree of Queen Maria II of Portugal, dated from January 14, 1833
- Marquis of Saldanha, by decree of Queen Maria II of Portugal, dated from May 27, 1834
- Count of Almoster, by decree of Queen Maria II of Portugal, dated from December 1, 1834

== See also ==
- Dukedoms in Portugal
- List of prime ministers of Portugal

== Bibliography ==
- "Nobreza de Portugal e do Brasil" – Vol. III, page 260/274. Published by Zairol Lda., Lisbon 1989.
