= Concession of Evoramonte =

1834 treaty ending the Portuguese Civil War

Convention of Evoramonte
Convention of Evoramonte, signed between the commanders of the armies of Maria II and Miguel I, on 26 May 1834
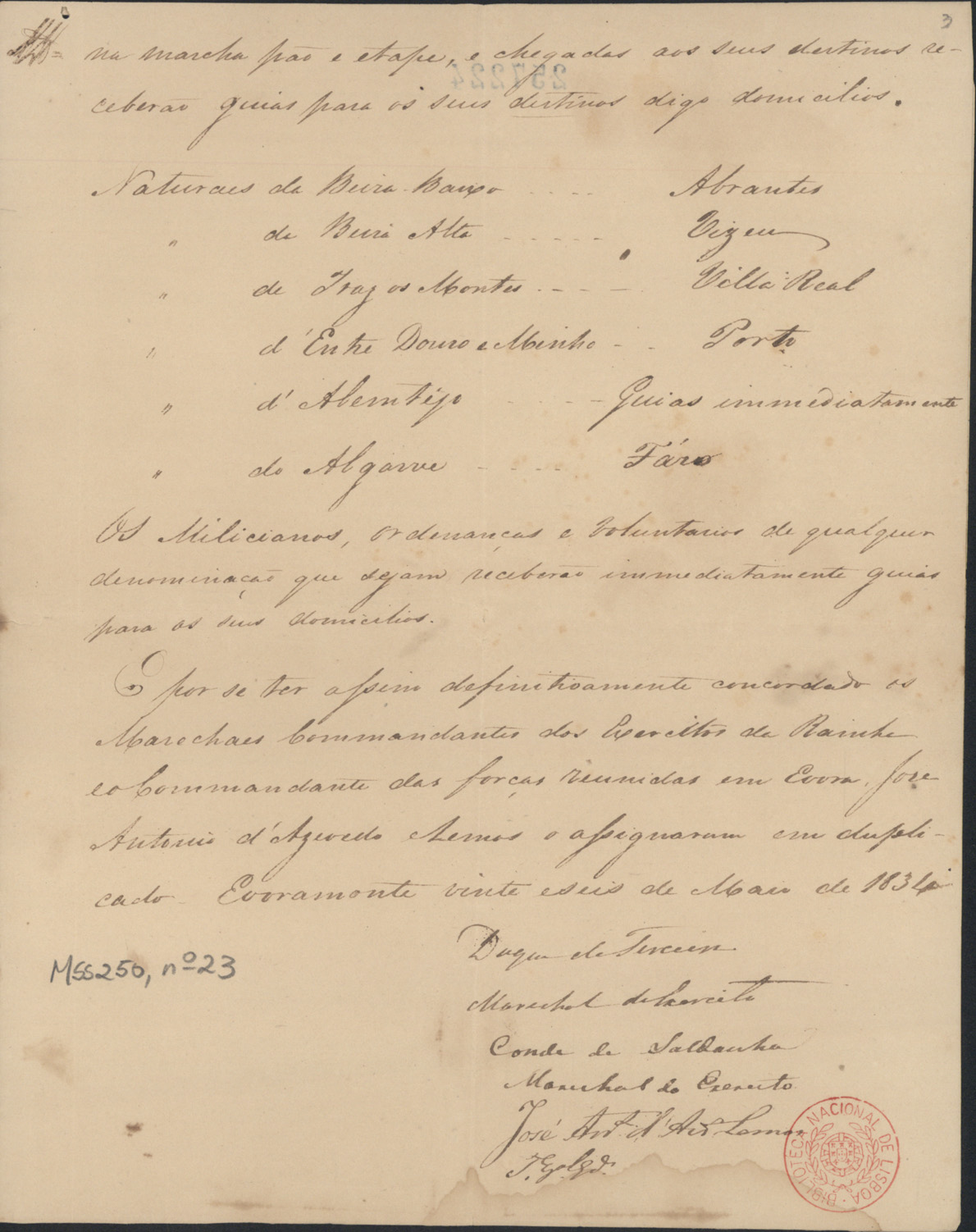
- Signatures of the Convention of Evoramonte
- Signed: 26 May 1834
- Location: Evoramonte, Alentejo, Portugal
- Effective: 26 May 1834
- Signatories: Marshal António José Severim de Noronha, 1st Duke of Terceira; Marshal João Carlos Saldanha de Oliveira Daun, 1st Count of Saldanha; Lt General José António Azevedo e Lemos
- Parties: Liberals; Miguelites
- Depositary: Government of Portugal
- Languages: Portuguese

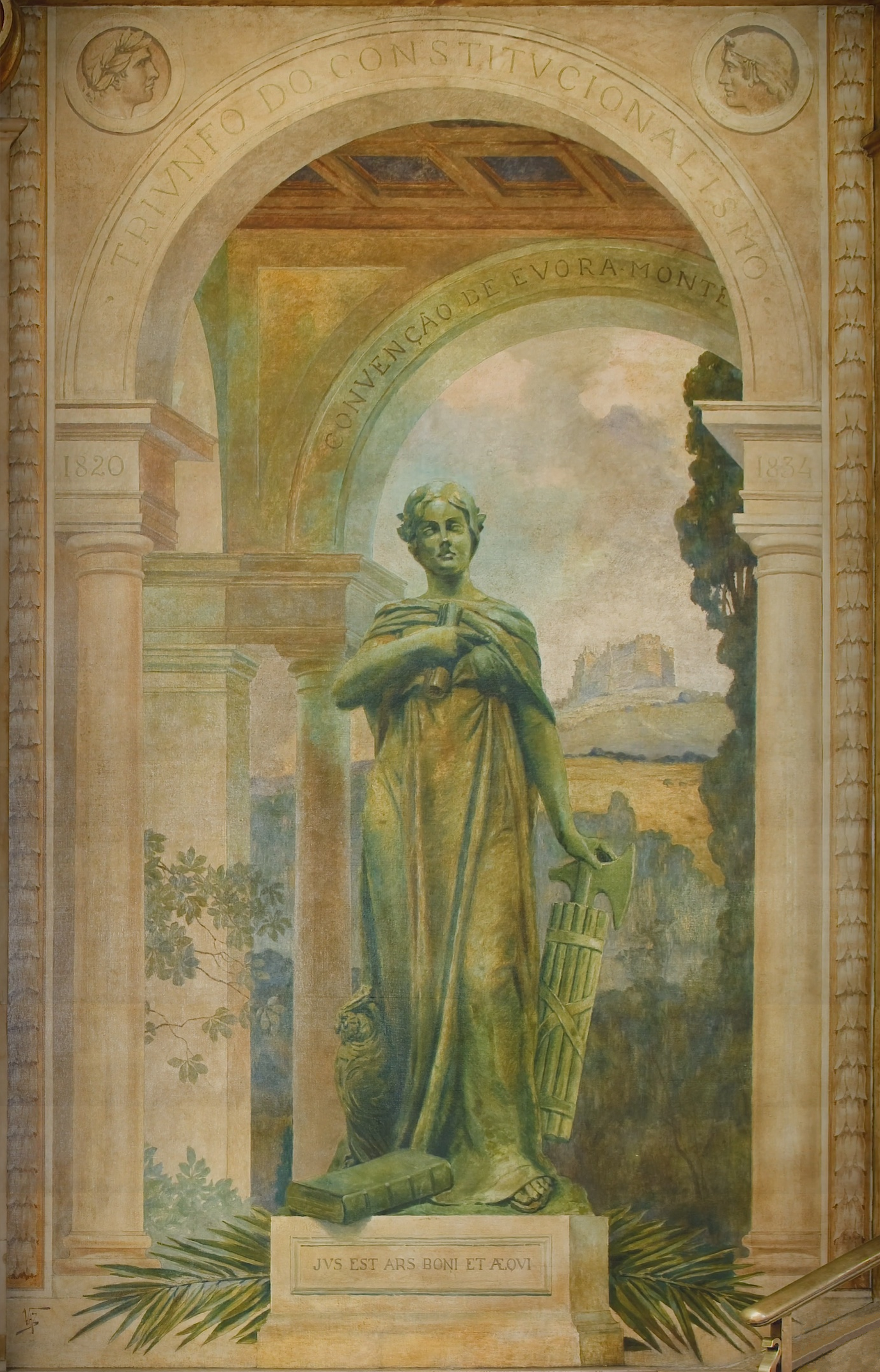
"The Triumph of Constitutionalism": allegory of the Convention of Evoramonte by João Vaz, São Bento Palace

The Concession of Evoramonte, also known as the Convention of Evoramonte, is a peace treaty signed on 26 May 1834, in the town of Evoramonte, Alentejo, between the Constitutionalists and the Miguelites, that ended the Portuguese Civil War (1828–1834).

On the Concession of Evoramonte, Dom Miguel I of Portugal, to end the bloodbath in the country after six years of civil war, surrendered and abandoned his claim to the Portuguese throne, being also subjected to exile and perpetual banishment from the Kingdom of Portugal.

It was signed by the representatives of the Constitutionalists, the Marshals of the Army, Duke of Terceira and Count of Saldanha, and by the Miguelite representative, Lieutenant General José António Azevedo e Lemos.

== Articles of the Concession of Evoramonte ==
The Concession was initially composed of nine articles, with four more added the following day:

- Article 1 - General amnesty was granted to all political crimes committed since 21 July 1826.
- Article 2 - Any person comprehended by the amnesty, national or foreign citizen, could freely leave the Kingdom with their property.
- Article 3 - All military officers could keep their ranks legitimately conferred to them.
- Article 4 - To all public and ecclesiastical employees, the same allowance would be contemplated, if their services and qualities would render them worthy.
- Article 5 - An annual pension of 60 contos de réis (12 000l.) was granted to Dom Miguel in deference of his royal ancestry; and he was allowed to dispose of his personal property, restoring however any jewels and other articles belonging to the Crown or private individuals.
- Article 6 - Dom Miguel could leave the Kingdom in a warship of the Allied Powers, which would be ready in any port he desired, being assured of total safety to him and his followers.
- Article 7 - Dom Miguel was permanently banned from the kingdom (and all its colonial possessions), a measure to be enforced within a fortnight.
- Article 8 - All troops loyal to Dom Miguel were to deliver their weapons to a depot indicated to them.
- Article 9 - All the Regiments and Corps loyal to Dom Miguel should peacefully disband themselves.

Additional articles:

- Article 1 - Orders would be immediately expedited to all Commanders of garrisons of the forces in campaign, and to all authorities who were still recognizing the government of Dom Miguel, that they should submit to the Government of Queen Maria II.
- Article 2 - The tenor of the previous article would extend to all ecclesiastical, civil and military authorities of the colonial possessions of the Monarchy.
- Article 3 - Dom Miguel should leave Évora on 30 May, for the town of Sines, where his embarkation for exile would take place.
- Article 4 - On 31 May, the troops of Dom Miguel would deposit their weapons in Évora at the local College.

== Protest of Genoa ==
Immediately after arriving at Genoa, the place of his exile, on 20 June 1834, Dom Miguel addressed himself to the Courts of Europe claiming that the Concession of Evoramonte was illegal, as it had been imposed on him by force by the governments of the Quadruple Alliance:

In consequence of the events which compelled me to leave my dominions of Portugal, and abandon for awhile the exercise of my power, the honour of my person, the interests of my faithful subjects, and finally, every motive of justice and decorum, require of me to protest, as I hereby do in the face of all Europe, with regard to the above events, and against any innovation whatsoever, which the Government, now existing in Lisbon, shall have introduced, or should hereafter introduce, contrary to the fundamental law of the kingdom. From the above exposé it may be inferred, that my acquiescing in all the stipulations imposed upon me by the preponderating forces confided to the Generals of the two Governments, now existing in Madrid and Lisbon, in accordance with two great Powers, was a mere provisional act on my part, for the purpose of saving my subjects in Portugal from misfortunes, which the just resistance I might have made would not have spared them, having been surprised by an unexpected and unwarranted attack from a friendly and allied power. By those motives I had firmly resolved, as soon as it should be in my power (as it behoved my honour and duty) to make known to all the Powers of Europe the injustice of the aggression directed against my rights and person; to protest and declare, as I now do, that I am at liberty, against the capitulation of the 26th of May last, which was proposed to me by the Government now existing in Lisbon, an act which I was obliged to sign, in order to prevent greater misfortunes, and spare the blood of my faithful subjects. This capitulation must be consequently be considered null and void.

== See also ==
- 1834 Quadruple Alliance

== Sources ==
- John Athelstane Smith, Conde da Carnota, Memoirs of Field-Marshal the Duke de Saldanha, with Selections from His Correspondence. Volume 1 ISBN 9780543954916
- Hernâni Cidade, História de Portugal: Implantação do Regime Liberal - Da revolução de 1820 á queda da Monarquia (2004) ISBN 989-554-112-0 (in Portuguese)
- H. Colburn, The United Service Journal, Part III (1834)
