= Duke of Palmela =

Dukedom of Palmela
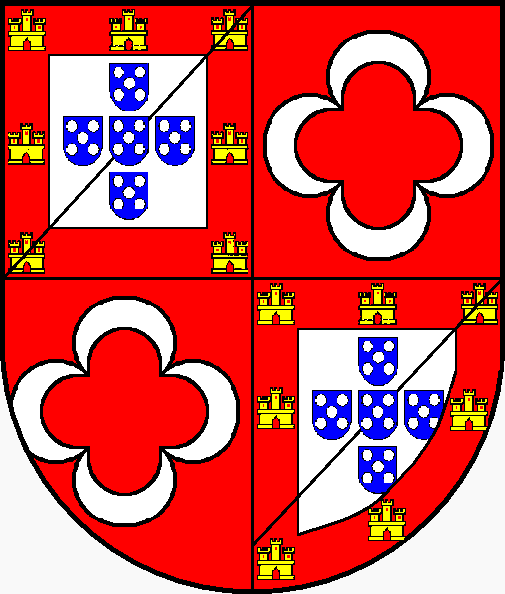
- Coat of Arms of the Count-Dukes of Palmela & Marquesses of Faial
- Creation date: 13 June 1883
- Created by: Maria II of Portugal
- First holder: Pedro de Sousa Holstein, 1st Count-Duke of Palmela
- Present holder: Pedro Domingos de Sousa Holstein e Beck, 7th Count-Duke of Palmela and Marquess of Faial
- Subsidiary titles: Marquess of Faial; Marquess of Palmela; Count of Palmela

The Duchy of Palmela was established by decree of Queen Maria II of Portugal, through Dom Pedro IV acting as Regent of the Kingdom, on 13 June 1833 (initially granted for life, then conferred as a hereditary title on 18 October 1850) in favour of Dom Pedro de Sousa Holstein, a diplomat and hero of the Liberal Wars, who had previously held, successively, the titles of first Count (by decree of Queen Maria I dated 11 April 1812) and Marquess of Palmela (by decree of King João VI dated 3 July 1823).

Prior to becoming Duke of Palmela, Dom Pedro de Sousa Holstein had been granted the title of Duke of Faial (4 April 1833).

== History ==
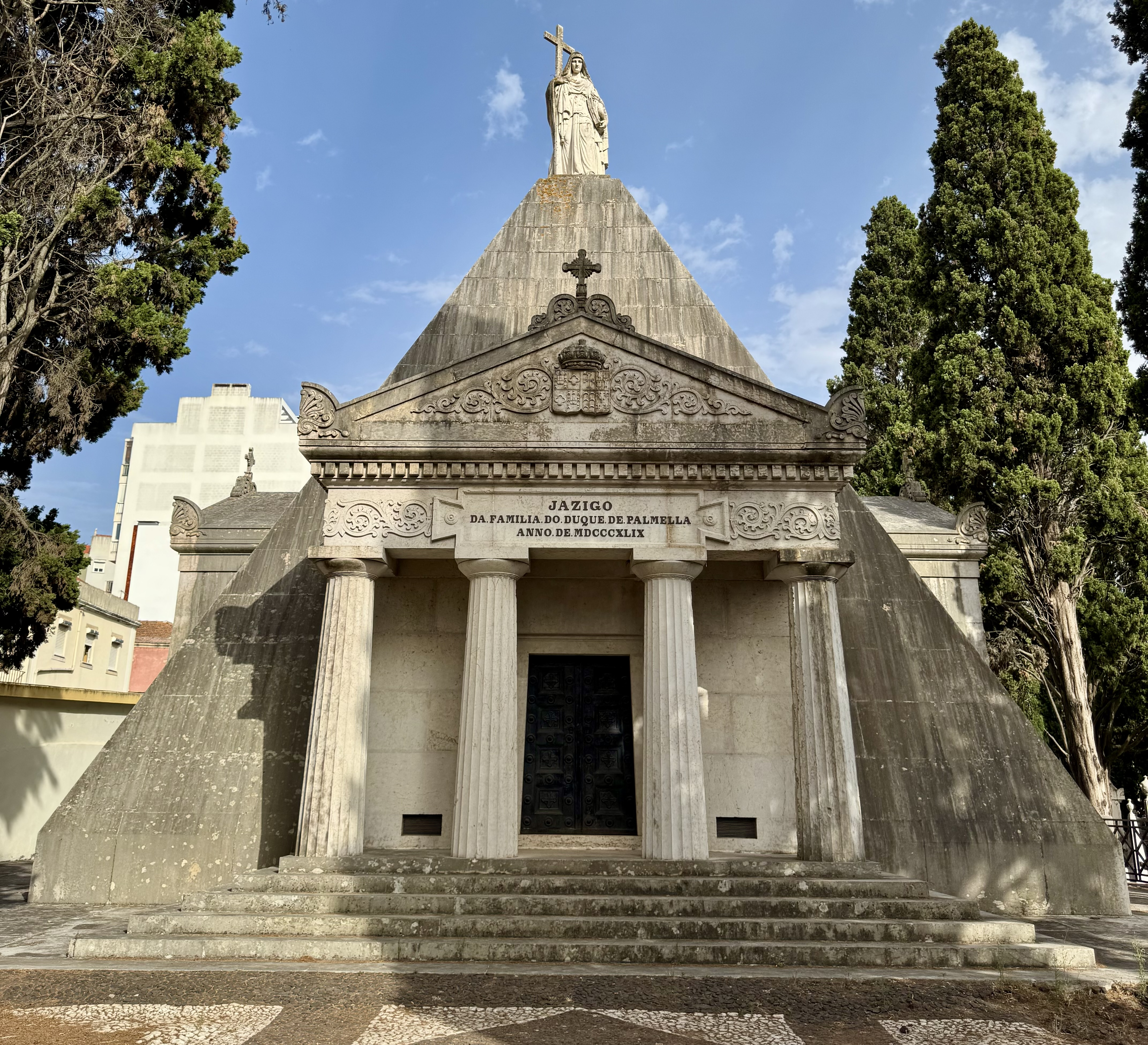
The tomb of the Dukes of Palmela at Prazeres Cemetery, Lisbon (August 2025)

The titles of Count and Marquess of Palmela were granted as hereditary honours. The title of Duke of Palmela was initially conferred for life (1833) and subsequently, in 1850, was made hereditary. The title of Duke of Faial, however, was granted during the lifetime of the first holder and was not renewed, having been, at the request of the Duke himself, superseded by the title of Duke of Palmela in 1833, the year both ducal titles were conferred. Shortly before Dom Pedro received the title of Marquess of Palmela, on 2 October of the same year, the title of Count of Calhariz was created, in favour of his firstborn son, Alexandre de Sousa e Holstein, the presumptive heir to the Marquisate of Palmela. One year after Dom Pedro had been granted the Dukedom of Faial, on 1 December 1834, the Marquisate of Faial was created in favour of his second son, Domingos de Sousa Holstein, who was also the presumptive heir to the Marquisate of Palmela and possibly to the Dukedom of Faial, as although the latter had been granted during the lifetime of the first holder, it could have been renewed by the Crown in his heirs. Domingos, the second son of Dom Pedro, only became the presumptive heir upon the death, while the Duke was still living, of his firstborn son, Alexandre, thereby becoming the second Count of Calhariz.

== Associated titles ==
By tradition, the presumptive heirs to the Dukedom of Palmela used the title Marquess of Faial until they were granted the ducal title, in homage to the Dukedom of Faial which had been conferred upon the first Duke of Palmela.

The titles associated with the House of Palmela include:

- Marquess of Sousa Holstein;
- Marquess of Sesimbra;
- Marquess of Monfalim.

These titles were used by some of the sons and grandsons of the Dukes of Palmela.

=== Duke of Faial ===
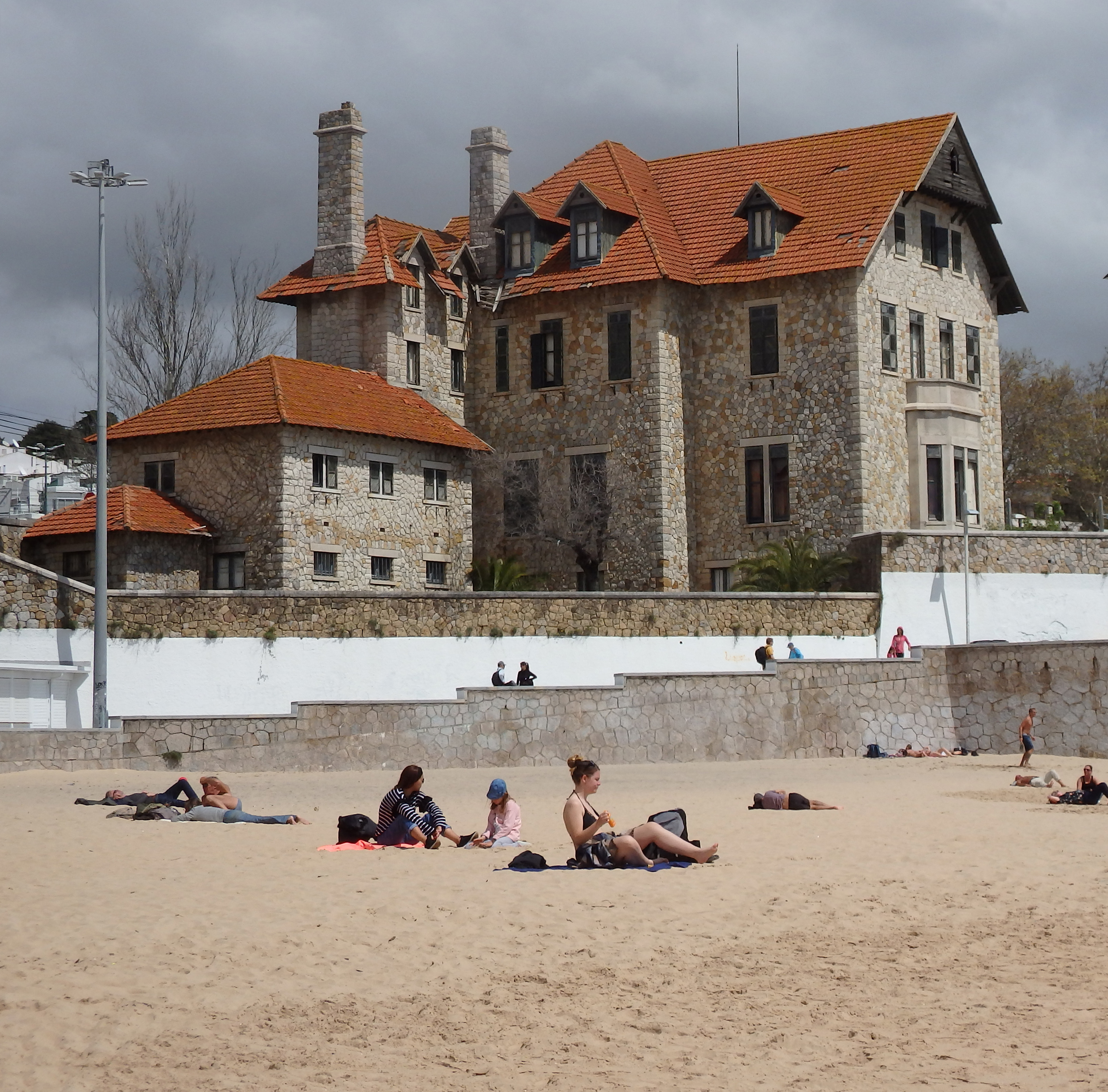
Chalet Faial on the Portuguese Riviera.

The title of Duke of Faial (Portuguese: Duque do Faial) was a Portuguese title of nobility, named for Faial Island in the Azores, which was granted by royal decree of Queen Maria II of Portugal, dated from 4 April 1833, to Pedro de Sousa Holstein, a 19th-century politician who served as Portugal's first prime-minister. Two months later, on 16 June, Sousa Holstein successfully petitioned the Queen to change the title from Duke of Faial to Duke of Palmela, which he used for the rest of his life. On 1 December 1834, less than a year from the abolition of the Faial ducal title for Palmela, Queen Maria II created the title of Marquis of Faial, to be used as a substantive title to the heirs of the Dukes of Palmela. Since 1834, the heir of the Duke of Palmela is always referred to as the Marquis of Faial.

When the Queen granted to Dom Pedro de Sousa Holstein the title of Duke of Faial, he was already 1st Count of Palmela (royal decree of 1812) and 1st Marquis of Palmela (royal decree of 1823). Due to his services to the Crown and Country, he obtained the ranking of Duke, as Duke of Faial. Later a royal decree of the Queen, dated from October 18, 1850, changed his original title to Duke of Palmela.

Chalet Faial is an estate in Cascais, on the Portuguese Riviera, located nearby Palmela Palace (summer estate of the Duke of Palmela). A notable example of Summer architecture, Chalet Faial was built near Palmela Palace to serve as the summer estate of the Marquis of Faial, the heir to the Duke of Palmela.

== Counts of Palmela ==
#	Name	Dates	Spouse	Notes
1	Dom Pedro de Sousa Holstein	1781–1850	Dona Eugénia Francisca Maria Ana Júlia Felizarda Apolónia Xavier Teles da Gama	Also 1st Marquess of Palmela and 1st Duke of Faial (later 1st Duke of Palmela).

== Marquesses of Palmela ==
#	Name	Dates	Spouse	Notes
1	Dom Pedro de Sousa Holstein	1781–1850	Dona Eugénia Francisca Maria Ana Júlia Felizarda Apolónia Xavier Teles da Gama	Also 1st Count of Palmela and 1st Duke of Faial (later 1st Duke of Palmela).

== Dukes of Faial (1833) ==
#	Name	Dates	Spouse	Notes
1	Dom Pedro de Sousa Holstein	1781–1850	Dona Eugénia Francisca Maria Ana Júlia Felizarda Apolónia Xavier Teles da Gama	Also 1st Count of Palmela and 1st Duke of Faial (later 1st Duke of Palmela).

== Dukes of Palmela (1833) ==
#	Name	Dates	Spouse	Notes
1	Dom Pedro de Sousa Holstein	1781–1850	Dona Eugénia Teles da Gama, daughter of the 7th Marquess of Nisa	Diplomat and military officer in the Peninsular War and the Portuguese Civil War (1832–1834). He was Count of Palmela (1812), ambassador in London, participant at the Congress of Vienna, served several times as Minister of Foreign Affairs and was elevated to Duke in 1833.
2	Dom Domingos António Maria Pedro de Sousa Holstein	1818–1864	—	2nd son of the above. 2nd Count of Calhariz and 1st Marquess of Faial. Peer of the Realm and diplomat.
3	Dona Maria Luísa de Sousa Holstein	1841–1909	António de Sampaio e Pina de Brederode	2nd Marchioness of Faial. Lady-in-waiting to Queen Maria Pia and chief lady-in-waiting to Queen Amélie. Founder of the Association of Economic Kitchens of Lisbon. In her honour, the Alameda Duchess of Palmela in Cascais was named after her.
4	Dona Helena Maria Domingas de Sousa Holstein	1864–1941	Dom Luís Coutinho de Medeiros de Sousa Dias da Câmara (son of the 1st Marquess of Praia e Monforte)	3rd Marchioness of Faial.

== Claimants of the Dukes of Palmela in the Republic ==
#	Name	Dates	Spouse	Notes
5	Domingos Maria do Espírito Santo José Francisco de Paula de Sousa Holstein-Beck	1897–1967	Maria do Carmo Pinheiro de Melo (daughter of 1st Count of Arnoso)	Graduated in civil engineering from the Faculty of Engineering of the University of Coimbra. Director of the Bank of Portugal and administrator of the Calouste Gulbenkian Foundation. Ambassador of Portugal in London during the Second World War.
6	Luís Maria da Assunção de Sousa e Holstein Beck	1919–1997	Maria Teresa de Jesus de Assis Pereira Palha	—
7	Pedro Domingos de Sousa e Holstein Beck	1951–	Isabel Astride Teixeira Guerra Dundas	Current claimant.

== See also ==
- Dukedoms of Portugal
- List of prime ministers of Portugal
