= Pedro de Sousa Holstein, 1st Duke of Palmela =

Portuguese noble and diplomat (1781–1850)

His Excellency The Duke of Palmela KGC FC
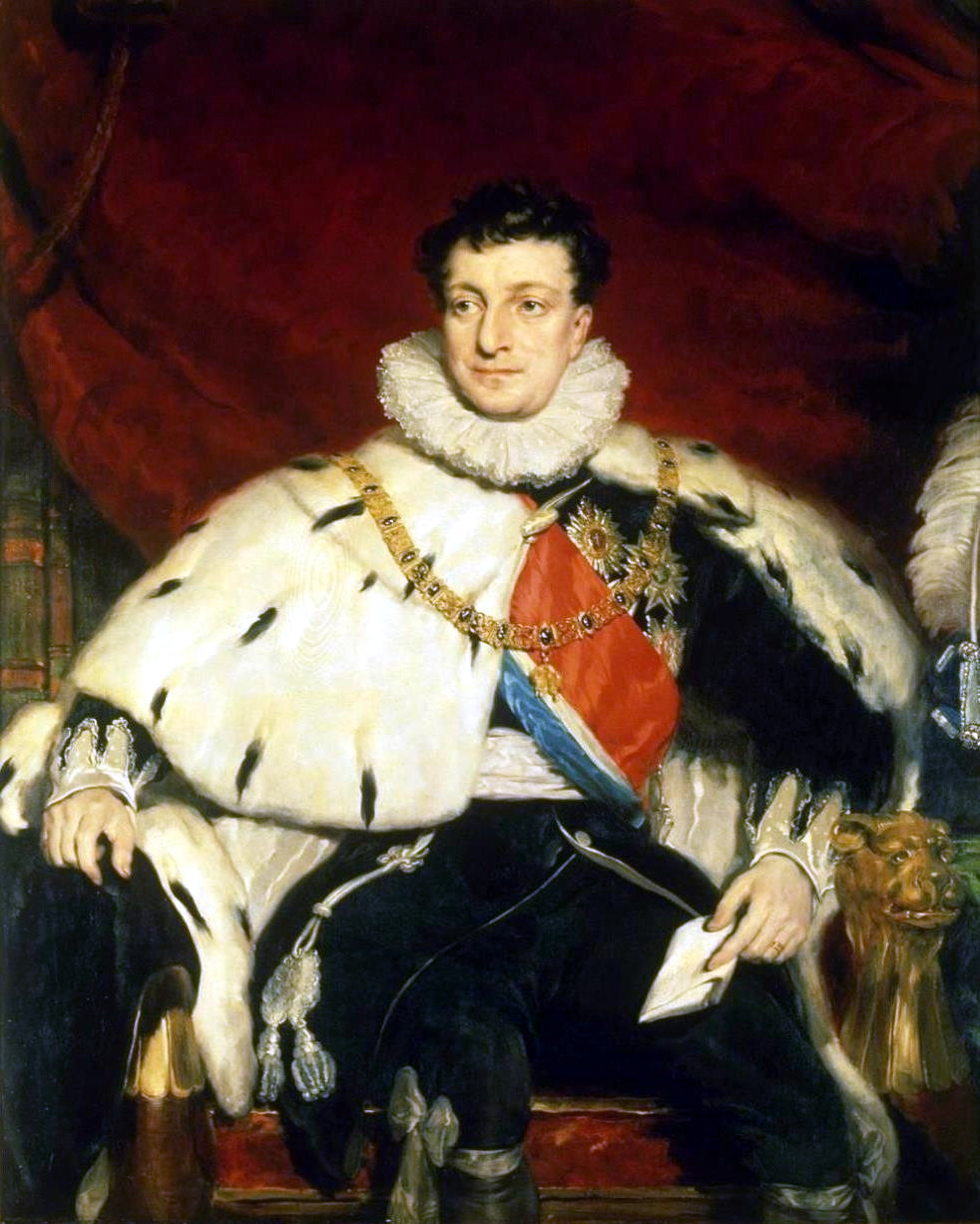
- Portrait by Thomas Lawrence

Prime Minister of Portugal
- In office 20 May 1846 – 6 October 1846
- Monarchs: Maria II and Fernando II
- Preceded by: Duke of Terceira
- Succeeded by: Duke of Saldanha
- In office 7 February 1842 – 9 February 1842
- Monarchs: Maria II and Fernando II
- Preceded by: Joaquim António de Aguiar
- Succeeded by: Duke of Terceira
- In office 24 September 1834 – 4 May 1835
- Monarch: Maria II
- Preceded by: Bento Pereira do Carmo (de facto)
- Succeeded by: Count of Linhares

President of the Chamber of Peers
- In office 10 July 1842 – 12 October 1850
- Monarchs: Maria II and Fernando II
- Preceded by: Himself (President of the Chamber of Senators)
- Succeeded by: Guilherme Henriques de Carvalho
- In office 14 August 1834 – 4 June 1836
- Monarch: Maria II
- Preceded by: Duke of Cadaval
- Succeeded by: Manuel Duarte Leitão (President of the Chamber of Senators)

President of the Chamber of Senators
- In office 17 February 1840 – 1 January 1842
- Monarchs: Maria II and Fernando II
- Preceded by: Manuel Duarte Leitão
- Succeeded by: Himself (President of the Chamber of Peers)
- In office 2 May 1839 – 11 January 1840
- Monarchs: Maria II and Fernando II
- Preceded by: Manuel Duarte Leitão
- Succeeded by: Manuel Duarte Leitão

Ministerial portfolios
- 1820–1821: War Affairs
- 1823–1825: Foreign Affairs
- 1832–1832: Interior Affairs
- 1835–1835: Foreign Affairs
- Feb 1842: Foreign Affairs
- 1846–1846: Finance Affairs
- May 1846: Justice Affairs (acting)
- May 1846: Interior Affairs
- 1846–1846: Interior Affairs

Ambassadorial posts
- 1809–1812: Spain
- 1816–1820: United Kingdom
- 1825–1827: United Kingdom

Personal details
- Born: 8 May 1781 Turin, Kingdom of Sardinia
- Died: 12 October 1850 (aged 69) Lisbon, Kingdom of Portugal
- Spouse: Eugénia Francisca Xavier Teles da Gama (m. 1810; died 1848)
- Children: 15

Dom Pedro de Sousa Holstein, 1st Duke of Faial and Palmela (8 May 1781 – 12 October 1850) was one of the most important Portuguese diplomats and statesmen in the first half of the 19th century. He also served as the country's first modern Prime Minister (with the title of "President of the Council of Ministers").

== Early life and career ==
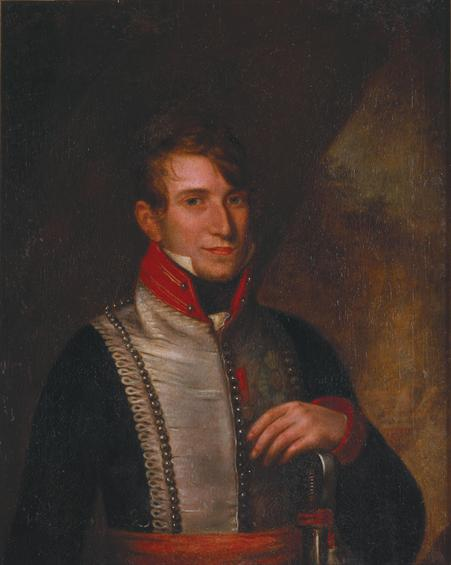
Portrait of Pedro de Sousa Holstein, by Domingos Sequeira (National Museum of Ancient Art)

He was born in Turin, a scion of the Portuguese de Sousa family, Lords of Calhariz.

The 'Holstein' element of his family name came from his paternal grandmother Princess Maria Anna Leopoldine of Schleswig-Holstein-Sonderburg-Beck, daughter of Frederick William I, Duke of Schleswig-Holstein-Sonderburg-Beck.

His uncle Frederico Guilherme de Sousa Holstein had been governor of Portuguese India.

He earned notoriety at an early age by telling Napoleon to his face at the conference in Bayonne in 1808 that the Portuguese would not ‘consent to become Spaniards’ as the French Emperor wanted.

He was Portuguese plenipotentiary to the Congress of Vienna in 1814, where he attempted to press Portugal's claims to Olivenza, and to the Treaty of Paris in 1815.

After this he was briefly ambassador to London, but then was appointed secretary of state for foreign affairs in Brazil. After the Liberal Revolution of 1820 he was commissioned by the revolutionary junta to inform the king, João VI, of what had taken place and to request his return to Portugal from Brazil.

In 1823 he was made a Marquis and became foreign minister as well as head of the committee which D. João appointed to devise a new constitutional charter. The resulting document, to which the King was unable to agree, was so liberal that it drew down on Palmela the hatred of the reactionary forces in the country, especially the Queen and the Infant Dom Miguel, who in 1824 had him arrested.

After he obtained his liberty he was made a minister of state and returned to London as ambassador.

== Liberal Wars ==
When Dom Miguel seized the throne of Portugal in 1828 Palmela sided with the opposition in Porto and was forced with many others to flee to England. An attempt to return to Porto in June 1828, called the Belfastada, failed. Greville noted in his diary for 16 August 1828:

”Esterhazy told me to-night that Palmella entertains from twenty to thirty of his countrymen at dinner every day, of whom there are several hundred in London, of the best families, totally destitute.”

Miguel condemned him to death in absentia and seized his estates, but Dom Pedro, Emperor of Brazil, appointed Palmela guardian to his daughter, the rightful Queen Maria II, and he acted as her ambassador at the British court.

In 1830 he set up the young queen’s regency on Terceira in the Azores; it was at this time that he became acquainted with Captain Charles Napier whom he considered the best person to command the Liberals' navy.

When Dom Pedro took charge of the regency in person in 1832 he named Palmela as his foreign minister, in which capacity he acted against Miguel from London.

In 1833 he sailed with Charles Napier bringing mercenary reinforcements to Porto, where Pedro was being besieged, and took part in the subsequent expedition to the Algarve of Napier and the Duke of Terceira.

After Napier’s naval victory off Cape St Vincent enabled Pedro to occupy Lisbon, Palmela retired from his offices.

== Constitutional Monarchy ==
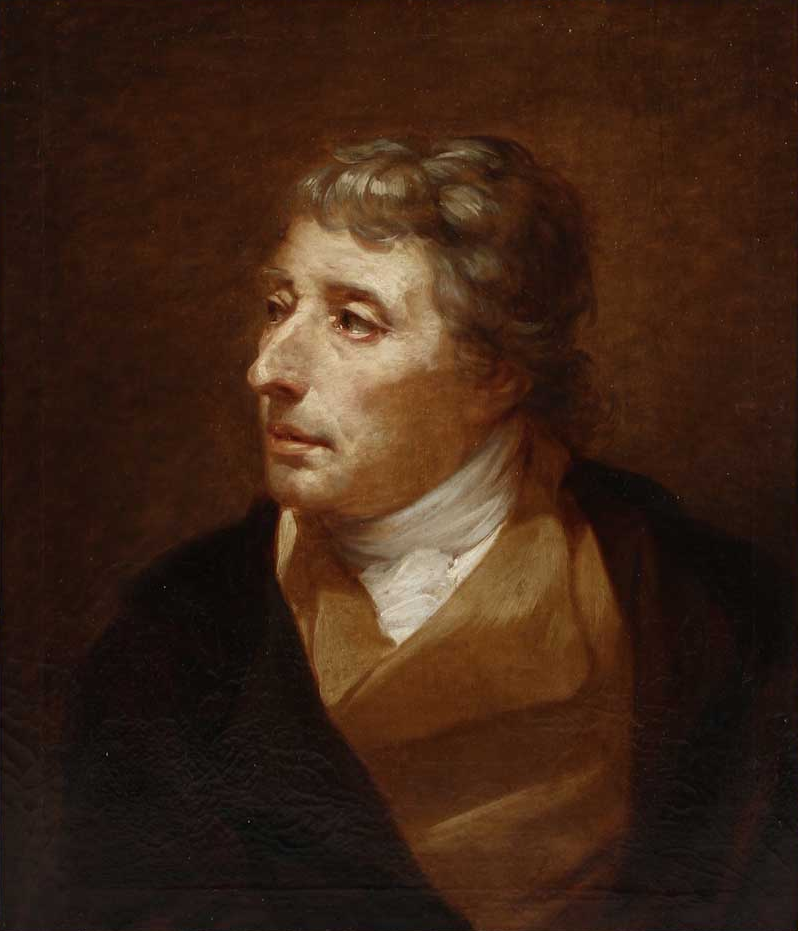
Portrait of the Duke of Palmela, c. 1840s, attributed to John Simpson

He served as the first Prime Minister of the newly formed constitutional monarchy in Portugal from 24 September 1834 to 4 May 1835.

He served briefly Prime Minister again in February 1842 (for two days, in the so-called Shrovetide Cabinet), and from March to October 1846 (during the height of the Revolution of Maria da Fonte).

Dom Pedro was successively made Count of Palmela (by Queen Maria I, on 11 April 1812), Marquis of Palmela (by King John VI on 3 July 1823) and Duke of Faial (by Queen Maria II on 4 April 1836).

Finally, on 18 October 1850, Queen Maria II substituted its Dukedom of Faial by the new title of Duke of Palmela.

== Marriage and issue ==
On 4 June 1810 Pedro de Sousa Holstein married Eugénia Francisca Xavier Teles da Gama (1798–1848). Their issue was:

- Alexandre de Sousa Holstein (1812–1832), 1st Count of Calhariz;
- Eugénia de Sousa Holstein (1813–1884), Marquise of Minas by marriage;
- Isabel de Sousa Holstein (1816–1819);
- Domingos de Sousa Holstein (1818–1864), succeeded his father as 2nd Duke of Palmela;
- Manuel de Sousa Holstein (1819–1837);
- Maria Ana de Sousa Holstein (1821–1844);
- Maria José de Sousa Holstein (1822–1834);
- Teresa de Sousa Holstein (1823–1885), Countess of Alcáçovas by marriage;
- Rodrigo de Sousa Holstein (1824–1840), Marquis of Palmela;
- Catarina de Sousa Holstein (1826–1885), Countess of Galveias by marriage;
- Ana Rosa de Sousa Holstein (1828–1864);
- Pedro de Sousa Holstein (1830–1830);
- Francisco de Borja de Sousa Holstein, 1.º Marquês de Sousa Holstein (1838–1878), 1st Marquis of Sousa Holstein;
- Tomás de Sousa Holstein (1839–1887), 1st Marquis of Sesimbra;
- Filipe de Sousa Holstein (1841–1884), 1st Marquis of Monfalim;

== See also ==
- Devorismo
- List of presidents of the Chamber of Most Worthy Peers (Kingdom of Portugal)

Political offices
Preceded by Duke of Terceira	Prime Minister of Portugal; 1846	Succeeded by Duke of Saldanha
Preceded by Joaquim António de Aguiar	Prime Minister of Portugal; 1842	Succeeded by Duke of Terceira
Preceded by Bento Pereira do Carmo as Minister and Secretary of State for Kingdom Affairs	Prime Minister of Portugal; 1834–1835	Succeeded by Count of Linhares
Preceded by Tomás de Vila Nova Portugal	Minister of War; 1820–1821	Succeeded by Silvestre Pinheiro Ferreira
Portuguese nobility
New title	Duke of Faial; 1836–1850	Title abolished
New title	Duke of Palmela; 1850–1850	Succeeded by Domingos Sousa Holstein
New title	Marquis of Palmela; 1823–1850	Succeeded by Domingos Sousa Holstein
