= António José Severim de Noronha, 1st Duke of Terceira =

Portuguese military officer, statesman and Prime Minister of Portugal

His Excellency The Duke of Terceira GCC GCTS GSJS GCICVV FC
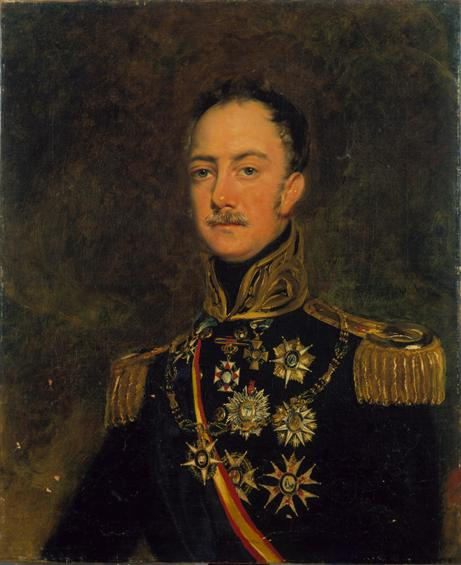
- Portrait by John Simpson

Prime Minister of Portugal
- In office 16 March 1859 – 26 April 1860
- Monarch: Pedro V
- Preceded by: Duke of Loulé
- Succeeded by: Joaquim António de Aguiar
- In office 26 April 1851 – 1 May 1851
- Monarchs: Maria II and Fernando II
- Preceded by: Marquess of Tomar
- Succeeded by: Duke of Saldanha
- In office 9 February 1842 – 20 May 1846
- Monarchs: Maria II and Fernando II
- Preceded by: Duke of Palmela
- Succeeded by: Duke of Palmela
- In office 20 April 1836 – 10 September 1836
- Monarch: Maria II
- Preceded by: José Jorge Loureiro
- Succeeded by: Count of Lumiares

16th Captain General of the Azores
- In office 5 April 1829 – 4 June 1832
- Monarch: Maria II
- Preceded by: Henrique de Sousa Prego
- Succeeded by: Angra Regency

11th Governor of Grão-Pará
- In office 19 May 1817 – 20 July 1820
- Monarch: João VI
- Preceded by: Count of Arcos
- Succeeded by: Romualdo Antônio de Seixas

Personal details
- Born: 18 March 1792 Lisbon, Kingdom of Portugal
- Died: 26 April 1860 (aged 68) Lisbon, Kingdom of Portugal
- Spouse(s): Maria José do Livramento e Melo; Maria Ana Luísa Filomena de Mendonça

D. António José Severim de Noronha, 1st Duke of Terceira, 1st Marquis of Vila Flor (18 March 1792, in Lisbon – 26 April 1860) was a Portuguese military officer, statesman and a leader of the Constitutionalist side in the Liberal Wars, as well as a Prime Minister of Portugal.

== Early life ==
António José de Sousa Manuel de Meneses Severim de Noronha was born in Lisbon, on 18 March 1792, first son of António de Sousa Manuel de Meneses Severim de Noronha, 6th Count of Vila Flor, and Maria José de Mendonça, 6th daughter of the Count of Vale de Reis. Born into a noble family, he was automatically hereditary heir to historic possessions and properties of one of the oldest and wealthiest families in Portugal.

He was just two years old, when in 1795, his father died, leaving him the title of Count of Vila Flor servant to the Queen, thus inheriting an immense fortune, that included real estate and a personal income. Among others, he inherited the commendations to Santa Maria de Pereira, São Pedro de Calvelo, São Tiago de Cassourado, São Vicente de Figueira and de São Geris de Arganil, as well as various annuities (such as 200$000–500$000 réis in his post as fishing sheriff of Lisbon). Similarly, he became patron of the Convent of the Order of Capuchin Friars Minor of Nossa Senhora dos Anjos, in Sobralinho, the chapel of Nossa Senhora do Pópulo (within the Convent of Boa Viagem), the hermitage of Nossa Senhora da Conceição do Portal, in the town of Alhandra, and the administration of various morgadios (that included two estates in Alverca do Ribatejo, the Lezíria da Corte da Vila and Casal de Borges, in Azambuja, the Herdade da Aravia, in Avis, and the houses of São João da Praça and morgado of Braço de Prata, in Lisbon.

Destined to a life at Court, he was instructed in the typical teachings bestowed on children of the Portuguese high nobility for the period, that included military arts and political life. In this context, in 1797, with less than four years of age, he received a commendation in the Military Order of Christ. Later, at the age of 12, he would profess religious orders (as a friar in the Order) at the Convent of Nossa Senhora da Luz.

Meanwhile, on 10 February 1802, the nine-year-old António José, had joined the 4th Regimental Cavalry as a cadet, to which he would be promoted to ensign by 24 June 1807. It was in this commission that Noronha was assigned, when on 20 November 1807, French troops invaded, under the command of Jean-Andoche Junot to begin the Peninsular War. Not prepared to submit to the French, he resigned his commission in the army, accepted by D. Pedro de Almeida Portugal, 3rd Marquis of Alorna, then commander of Portuguese forces.

=== Peninsular War ===
With expulsion of French forces, the Count of Vila Flor returned to the army, in the same position he held until his departure. On 6 December 1809, he was promoted to lieutenant, later to captain of the 5th company of the 4th Regimental Cavalry. During this period, that corresponded the later invasions of the Peninsular War, he actively participated the campaign.

On 5 August 1811 he married his cousin, Maria José do Livramento e Melo, daughter of the Marquess of Sabugosa, strengthening his alliance with the principal families of the high nobility. From this marriage, he had a son, who would become the 7th Count of Vila Flor (but who died at 15 months).

He began to serve as adjutant under General António José de Miranda Henriques, 1st Viscount of Sousel, and after 26 March 1813, Marshal William Carr Beresford, then supreme commander of the Portuguese Army. He was, therefore, promoted to Major, and distinguished himself during the Peninsular campaigns, and in particular the battle of Vitória, of which he was honored to be sent as dispatch to London, to announce its victory. He was highly praised by General Arthur Wellesley, later Duke of Wellington, in a letter written to the future king John VI, then prince regent, when the General recounted the triumph. Arriving as the messenger of the Portuguese victory, he was enthusiastically greeted and lauded, but immediately promoted to Lieutenant-Colonel (August 1813). Returning to Portugal, after the Peninsular War (he was 22), he was promoted to Colonel and in December 1815, decorated Knight of the Order of the Tower and Sword, for his valor during the campaigns.

=== Liberal Wars ===
He held the island of Terceira, in the Azores, for the rightful Queen Maria II of Portugal, when her uncle Miguel of Portugal usurped the Portuguese throne in 1828. He was the leader of the army of Pedro IV of Portugal, former Emperor of Brazil and King of Portugal, father of Queen Maria II, in his attempt to defeat the usurper, and with him endured the siege of Porto, 1832–1833. After the Battle of Ponte Ferreira on 23 July 1832, he offered to resign his command but was confirmed and created Duke of Terceira.

In July 1833, having been transported with half his army to the Algarve by a fleet under Admiral Charles Napier, he was victorious at the Battle of Almada which caused the Miguelites to abandon Lisbon, and with the Duke of Saldanha was in charge of the concluding campaign against Miguel's forces, and dealt them their final defeat at the Battle of Asseiceira.

== Later life ==
After the liberal triumph, in 1834, he was four times Prime Minister of Portugal. His first period of office fell from April to September 1836, but in the latter month he joined the 'Chartist' revolt raised by the Duke of Saldanha; their forces were defeated by the army of the Count of Antas. He served again as Prime Minister from 1842 to 1846, for a few days in April–May 1851, and from March 1859 to his death on 26 April 1860. At the funeral of the Duke of Wellington, he was the bearer of Wellington's Portuguese Army marshal's baton.

== See also ==
- Devorismo
- Revolt of the Marshals

Political offices
Preceded by Duke of Loulé	Prime Minister of Portugal; 1859–1860	Succeeded by Joaquim António de Aguiar
Preceded by Marquis of Tomar	Prime Minister of Portugal; 1851	Succeeded by Duke of Saldanha
Preceded by Duke of Palmela	Prime Minister of Portugal; 1842–1846	Succeeded by Duke of Palmela
Preceded by José Jorge Loureiro	Prime Minister of Portugal; 1836	Succeeded by Count of Lumiares
Preceded by Henrique de Sousa Prego	Captain-General of the Azores; 1829–1832	Succeeded by Angra Regency
Preceded by Count of Arcos	Governor of Grão-Pará; 1817–1820	Succeeded by Romualdo Antônio de Seixas
Portuguese nobility
New title	Duke of Terceira; 1832–1860	Succeeded by Maria Luísa de Almeida Manoel de Vilhena
New title	Marquis of Vila Flor; 1833–1860	Succeeded by Maria Luísa de Almeida Manoel de Vilhena
Preceded by António de Meneses Severim de Noronha	Count of Vila Flor; 1795–1860	Succeeded by Maria Luísa de Almeida Manoel de Vilhena
