= His Most Faithful Majesty's Council =

Privy council to the Kings of Portugal, to 1910

His Majesty's Council (before 1748); His Most Faithful Majesty's Council (after 1748); was the privy council of the Kings of Portugal. It was composed of a small group of fidalgos of great social and political importance.

In political importance, only his Most Faithful Majesty's ministers were above the council, though they were often part of the council as well.

== Fidalgos ==
A member of the council was called a Fidalgo of His Most Faithful Majesty's Council. If the members of the council did not have a title from Portuguese nobility, he would be addressed as "my Fidalgo" or "my Lord", by his inferiors, and "Counselor" or "Lord Counselor," by his peers in his social scale or higher. Alongside this, a member of His Most Faithful Majesty's Council was granted the styling of Excellency.
