= José Travassos Valdez, 1st Count of Bonfim =

Portuguese soldier (1787–1862)

His Excellency The Count of Bonfim
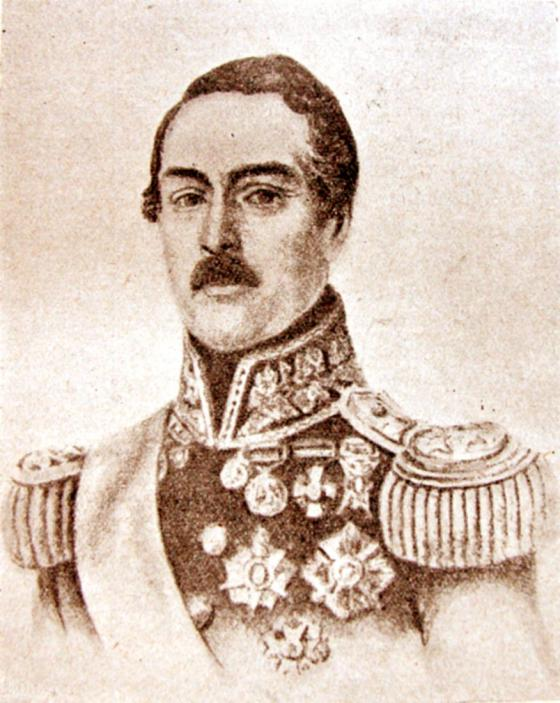

Prime Minister of Portugal
- In office November 26, 1839 – June 9, 1841
- Monarchs: Maria II and Fernando II
- Preceded by: Rodrigo Pinto Pizarro
- Succeeded by: Joaquim António de Aguiar

Personal details
- Born: February 23, 1787 Elvas, Kingdom of Portugal
- Died: July 10, 1862 (aged 75) Lisbon, Kingdom of Portugal
- Party: Septemberist

Military service
- Allegiance: Kingdom of Portugal
- Branch/service: Army
- Years of service: 1808–1862
- Rank: Brigadier
- Battles/wars: Peninsular War; Battle of Roliça; Battle of Vimeiro; Battle of Albuera; Battle of Salamanca; Battle of Orthez; Battle of Toulouse; Liberal Wars; Battle of Ponte Ferreira; Siege of Porto; First Carlist War

José Lúcio Travassos Valdez (February 23, 1787 – July 10, 1862), only Baron and first Count of Bonfim (Portuguese pronunciation: [bõˈfĩ]), was a Portuguese soldier and statesman.

== Early life ==
Travassos Valdez was born in Elvas, Portugal, on February 23, 1787, to parents Jose Bento Travassos and Donna Antonia Eufrazia Valdez. Originally intended for a career in the Catholic Church but, following the invasion of Portugal by Napoleon's armies under General Junot, became active in the resistance to the occupation.

When Arthur Wellesley (later the first Duke of Wellington) landed in Portugal to eject the French, Travassos Valdez served Wellesley as a Portuguese aide-de-camp at the battles of Roliça and Vimeiro, his first major victory.

During the Peninsular War, Travassos Valdez was among the first Portuguese officers to attach himself to the command of Marshal William Carr Beresford and was so close to this commander that he was popularly known in the Portuguese battalions as 'o discípulo de Beresford' ("the disciple of Beresford").

Travassos Valdez rose to become a Major Assistant in the General Staff of the Portuguese army under Beresford and is reputed to have fought in nine major battles. He was decorated for his services at the battles of Albuera (fought on May 16, 1811, and at which Beresford, operating independently from Wellington, commanded the allied forces), Salamanca (July 22, 1812), Orthez (February 27, 1814), and Toulouse (April 5, 1814).

== Civil strife ==
After the revolution of 1820, in the civil war between Constitutionalists Liberals (the new parliamentary constitution was supported by King João VI) and Absolutists (supporting his younger son, the Infante – that is, royal prince – Miguel of Portugal, a sworn enemy of any form of democracy), Travassos Valdez was strongly on the Constitutionalist side and was engaged in suppressing Absolutist revolts.

When Miguel became titular commander-in-chief of the army, he had Travassos Valdez removed from his post and sent into exile in Setúbal, where the 'Parc Bonfim' now commemorates his time there; but after the prince overreached himself in April 1825, with an attempted coup (known as the Abrilada) and was sent into exile, Travassos Valdez was reinstated. After the death of King João VI, a Spanish army invaded Portugal to restore Absolutist rule; Travassos Valdez, with just 900 men, opposed 6,000 Spaniards at Bragança, delaying their advance until the government was able to raise sufficient forces to oppose them. However, the Spaniards captured Travassos Valdez and sent him to Spain; but he escaped and returned to Portugal. He then declined the governorship of Portuguese Angola, offered him by the regent, Dona Isabel Maria, and was instead made Captain General (governor) of Madeira and Porto Santo in 1827.

When Dom Miguel returned and seized power from the rightful heir, his niece Maria II, and proclaimed himself 'Absolute King', Travassos Valdez held out in Madeira until his defence of the island was overwhelmed by an expeditionary force despatched from Portugal. As Miguel had given orders that Travassos Valdez should be hanged if captured, he was forced to flee the Portuguese realms and, with his wife, brother, and six children, sailed to England under the protection of the British Royal Navy in September 1828. He joined the many refugees from Dom Miguel's tyranny and in 1832 made his way to the Azores to join the expedition of Dom Pedro I of Brazil, father of Maria II and formerly Emperor of Brazil, to restore Maria to her throne and constitutional rule to Portugal.

Pedro's expeditionary force landed in Portugal in 1832 and was besieged for a year in the city of Porto. After the Battle of Ponte Ferreira, when Dom Pedro instituted changes in his high command, Travassos Valdez exercised the functions of Adjutant-General and chief of the General Staff of the Army of Liberation. During the major Miguelite assault on the city on September 29, 1832, Travassos Valdez was severely wounded defending the redoubt at the Bonfim church; from this, he later took his title of nobility. A year later, on September 5, 1833, he was again wounded at the siege of Lisbon, which the Constitutionalists had wrested from Dom Miguel. Dom Miguel was at last defeated in 1834 and sent into exile, this time permanently.

== Insurrections and political office ==
Dom Pedro died immediately after his victory and a long period of political unrest between competing factions began under the young queen Maria II. Governments came and went, mostly lasting only a few months. On September 17, 1835, Travassos Valdez was elevated to the peerage as Baron Bonfim. From October 1836 he commanded forces in the Alentejo against the Spanish Carlist general, Miguel Gómez Damas, who was threatening the frontier. In 1837 he was elected deputy for the constituents of the district of Leiria to the parliament.

When the Chartist forces raised an insurrection against the government on July 12, 1837, and the Dukes of Saldanha and Terceira, João Carlos de Saldanha Oliveira e Daun and António José Severim de Noronha, put themselves at its head, according to an early 20th-century account:

"The Lisbon government confided extraordinary powers to the Viscount de Sá and the baron de Bonfim. These two officers, with the constitutional forces, attacked the marshals' troops at Rio Maior on the 28th of August, and, although on both sides they had more than six weeks in which to make preparations, neither of the armies counted 800 men. But the soldiers were more prudent than their leaders. After a slight infantry skirmish in which the Portuguese had sensible losses to deplore, the marshals gave the order to charge to their little squadron and the Viscount de Sá advanced at the head of his troop. The cavalry on both sides stopped at 50 paces, replaced their sabres in their scabbards, and having fraternised returned faithfully to the flags of their respective commanders. The latter saw themselves compelled to sign an armistice and the marshals retired to the North."

On September 9, 1837, Bonfim was appointed Minister of War and interim Foreign Minister and Minister of Marine in the second government of Bernardo de Sá Nogueira de Figueiredo. Among his acts in this office, following the crushing of the Chartist rebellion at the Battle of Ruivães on September 20, 1837, was disarming the National Guard, which had been converted into a permanent force for insurrection. On March 13, 1838, he used troops to put down a revolt by rebels who had occupied the Lisbon Arsenal, a decisive act that probably prevented the fall of the liberal government. By a Decree of D. Maria II of April 4, 1838 he was elevated to the Nobility, as Count of Bonfim. (The family tended to use the older spelling 'Bomfim'.) He was a senator in the legislature of 1839–40.and deputy for the constituents of the district of Leiria. On September 26, 1839, he assumed the leadership of the government as Prime Minister, and provided the first period of relative stability by presiding over the eleventh government, a coalition which succeeded in remaining in office for nearly two years, until 1841. He retained the office of Foreign Minister until December 28, 1839. Bonfim's administration, in which he combined the posts of Prime Minister, Minister of War, and head of the Colonial Department, lasted to June 9, 1841. Among those taking office in his ministry were Costa Cabral, Rodrigo da Fonseca Magalhães and others. It was during the period of his government that various European powers (among them, the Holy See) resumed diplomatic relations with Portugal, having broken them off after the arrival of the constitutional regime. He especially cultivated friendly relations with Spain after the tensions of the Carlist War. He was responsible for the foundation in July 1840 of the fortress and town of Mossâmedes in southern Angola and he promoted internal pacification in Portugal. On December 26, 1840, Portugal and the United States of America signed a Mutual Treaty of Commerce and Navigation. Bonfim resigned the premiership when he encountered resistance to his plans to reform the National Guard, and was succeeded in office by Joaquim António de Aguiar, who had been his deputy.

== Later years ==
After the coup d'état of 1842, which brought the Costa Cabral government to power, the Count of Bonfim became its most implacable opponent. In 1844 he raised the standard of rebellion against Costa Cabral's dictatorial policies but his associates were imprisoned or forced to flee the country and he himself left Portugal until the rebellion of Maria da Fonte in 1846. When the anti-Cabralist government of the Duke of Palmela took office Bonfim returned to Portugal, but in October the palace coup known as the Emboscada brought a new government of Cabralist sympathies to power, headed by the Duke of Saldanha. In the ensuing 'Little Civil War' or Patuleia, Travassos Valdez supported the revolutionary Junta of Porto against the more conservative forces around the Queen and took command of the 'Progressista' army. Expected reinforcement from the troops commanded by the Conde of Antas, the President of the Junta, was not forthcoming in time, and Bonfim and his army were besieged by Saldanha in the fortress of Torres Vedras and defeated, December 22–23, 1846. In violation of their safe-conduct, Bonfim, his two eldest sons and various political associates were exiled to Moçâmedes in southern Angola. He escaped from there with his sons in a skiff, intending to sail to Saint Helena, but was recaptured; the safe return of the exiles by the British Royal Navy and their honourable reinstatement was a condition of the Peace negotiated by the Four Powers at the Convention of Gramido, 1847. Bonfim and his associates were repatriated to Portugal in the British frigate HMS Terrible, returning to Lisbon on October 9, and his rank and honours were restored. After 1851 he was appointed head of the Supreme Council of Military Justice, and on his death in Lisbon in 1862 was accorded a state funeral.

== Progeny ==
He had married (February 21, 1813) D. Jerónima Emília Godinho Valdez, daughter of José Ricardo Godinho Valdez, 14th lord Quinta de Flandres, Pombal, and administrator of N. Sr.ª das Neves and Marco, and his wife D. Maria Joana Travassos da Silveira. (Travassos Valdez's wife was his first cousin twice over, being the daughter of his father's sister and his mother's brother.) Among the most notable of his children :

- José Bento Travassos Valdez (1814–1881), Colonial Secretary of Angola in 1841–45, shared his father's exile in 1846–47, became 2nd Count of Bonfim;
- Luís Travassos Valdez (1816–1900) attained the rank of General and was a distinguished writer on military affairs;
- António Travassos Valdez (1818–1855), entered the diplomatic service, edited the first annual report of the conduct of affairs published by the Foreign Ministry and died as Portuguese ambassador to Denmark;
- Francisco Travassos Valdez (1825–1892), noted travel writer and anti-slavery campaigner;
- Pedro de Alcântara Travassos Valdez (1827–1887), settled in the English village of Dalwood in Devon and is buried in the graveyard of St Peter's Church there, with an elaborate headstone summarizing his father's career.

== Notes ==
Political offices
Preceded by Rodrigo Pinto Pizarro	Prime Minister of Portugal; 1839–1841	Succeeded by Joaquim António de Aguiar
