= Portuguese Revolution =

The Portuguese Revolution may refer to

- The Portuguese Restoration War
- The Liberal Revolution of 1820
- The April Revolt of 1824
- The Revolution of Maria da Fonte of 1846
- The 5 October 1910 revolution
- The 28 May 1926 coup d'état
- The Carnation Revolution of 1974
