= Belgian Legion (Liberal Wars) =

19th-century volunteer military unit in Portugal

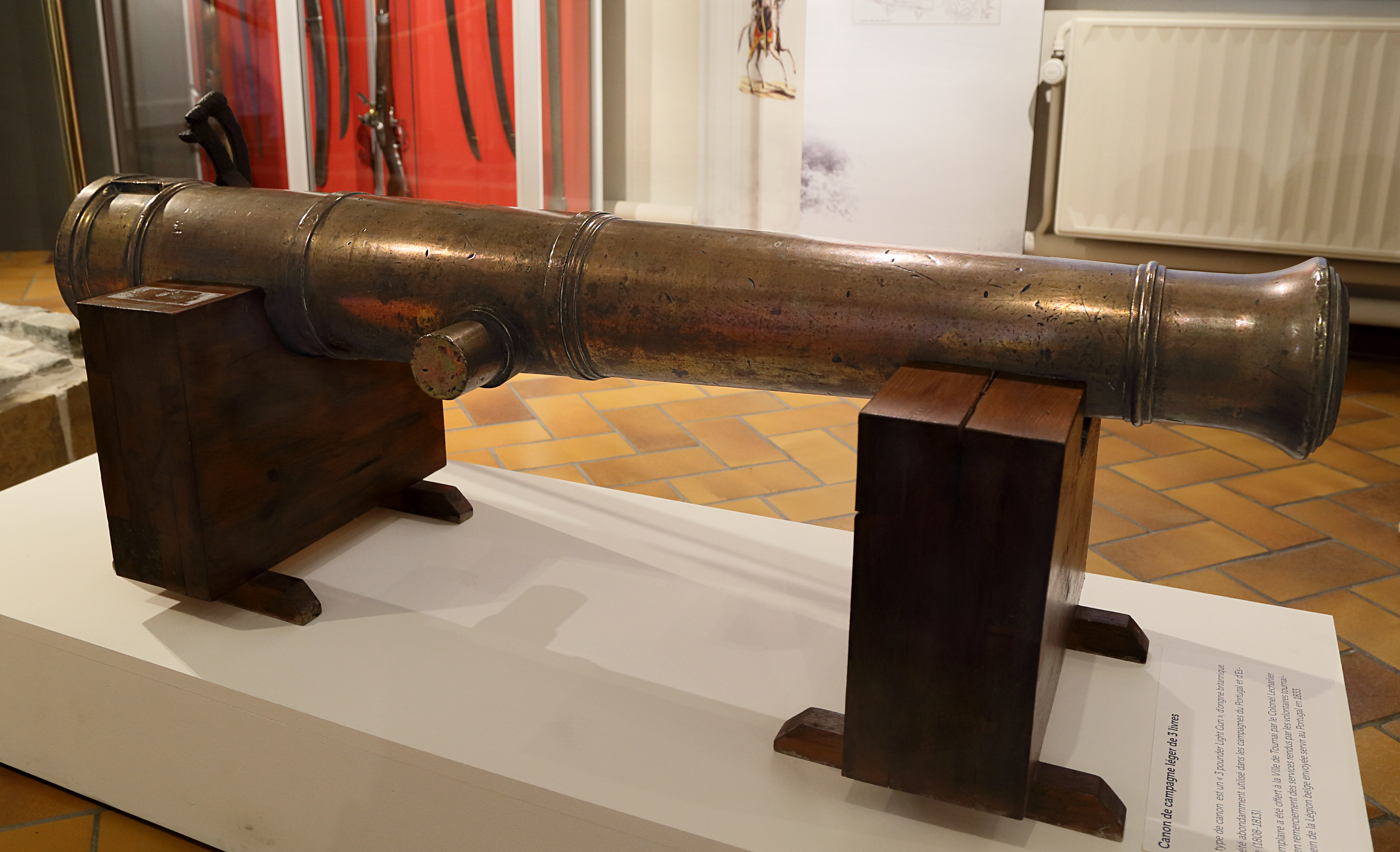
Portuguese canon presented to Tournai by Pierre-Joseph Lecharlier in 1835 in recognition of the city's contribution to the Legion

The Corps of Belgian Riflemen (French: Corps de Tirailleurs Belges, Portuguese: Corpo de atiradores belgas) or Corps of Portuguese Riflemen (Corps de Tirailleurs Portugaises, Corpo de atiradores portugueses) was a military unit of volunteers from newly independent Belgium raised to fight for the Portuguese Liberals in the Liberal Wars between 1832 and 1834.

The unit, often known as the Belgian Legion, was commanded by Lieutenant-Colonel Pierre-Joseph Lecharlier (1797-1847) and consisted of between 1,000 and 1,500 volunteers. It notably fought in the Siege of Porto.
