= Bernardo de Sá Nogueira de Figueiredo, 1st Marquis of Sá da Bandeira =

Portuguese politician (1795–1876)

His Excellency The Marquis of Sá da Bandeira
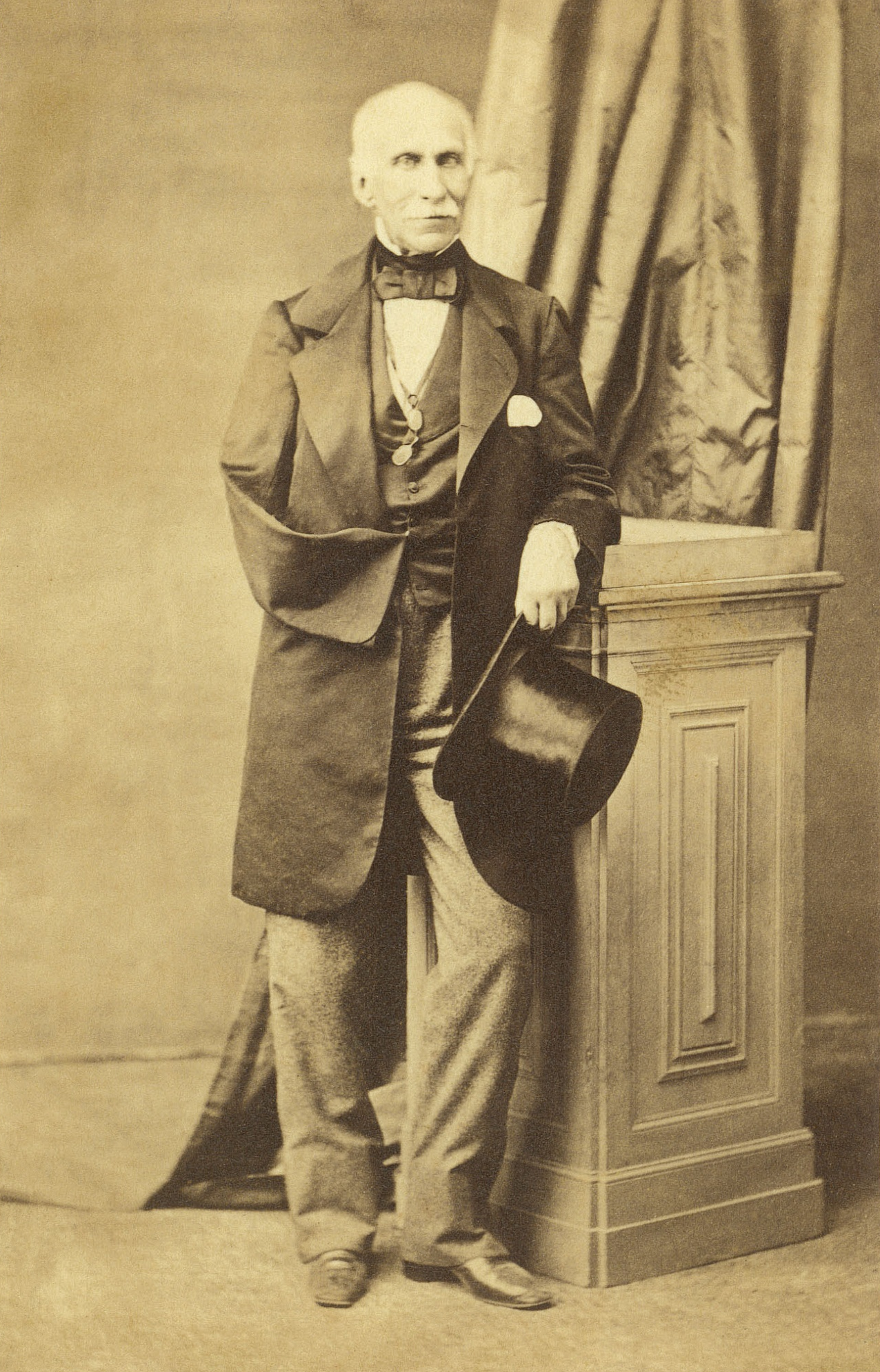
- Photograph of Sá da Bandeira, c. 1870s

President of the Council of Ministers of the Kingdom of Portugal
- In office 29 August 1870 – 29 October 1870
- Monarch: Luís I of Portugal
- Preceded by: João Carlos de Saldanha Oliveira e Daun
- Succeeded by: António José de Ávila
- In office 22 July 1868 – 11 August 1869
- Monarch: Luís I of Portugal
- Preceded by: António José de Ávila
- Succeeded by: Nuno José Severo de Mendoça Rolim de Moura Barreto
- In office 17 April 1865 – 4 September 1865
- Monarch: Luís I of Portugal
- Preceded by: Nuno José Severo de Mendoça Rolim de Moura Barreto
- Succeeded by: Joaquim António de Aguiar
- In office 10 August 1837 – 18 April 1839
- Monarch: Maria II of Portugal
- Preceded by: António Dias de Oliveira
- Succeeded by: Rodrigo Pinto Pizarro
- In office 5 November 1836 – 2 June 1837
- Monarch: Maria II of Portugal
- Preceded by: José Bernardino de Portugal e Castro
- Succeeded by: António Dias de Oliveira

Personal details
- Born: 26 September 1795 Santarém, Kingdom of Portugal
- Died: 6 January 1876 (aged 80) Lisbon, Kingdom of Portugal

Bernardo de Sá Nogueira de Figueiredo, 1st Marquess de Sá da Bandeira (26 September 1795 – 6 January 1876) was a Portuguese nobleman and politician. He served as Prime Minister of Portugal for five times. He was the most prominent Portuguese defender of the abolition of slavery in Portugal and its domains, while also defending a modernized and expanded colonial empire.

== Life ==
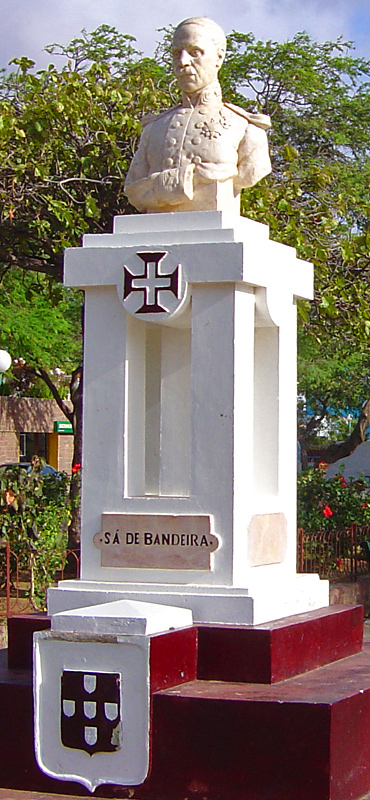
Bust of Sá da Bandeira in Mindelo, Cape Verde

Sá Nogueira de Figueiredo was born in Santarém in 1795 to Faustino José Lopes Nogueira de Figueiredo e Silva (1767–1830) and Francisca Xavier de Sá Mendonça Cabral da Cunha Godinho (1772–1829). Sá Nogueira de Figueiredo supported the liberal party during the Liberal Wars (1828–1834), and took part in the landing at Mindelo in July 1832. He fought in the Siege of Porto and was wounded in his right arm, which had to be amputated.

Sá da Bandeira was Minister of the Navy in the government of José Jorge Loureiro (1835–36). He was Prime Minister of Portugal for five terms:

- 5 November 1836 – 1 June 1837
- 10 August 1837 – 18 April 1839
- 17 April 1865 – 5 September 1865
- 22 July 1868 – 11 August 1869
- 29 August – 29 October 1870

He never married but he had a legitimised daughter born out of wedlock, named Luísa Aglaé Fanny de Sá Nogueira, who married her cousin Faustino de Paiva de Sá Nogueira. The city of Lubango, Angola, was called Sá de Bandeira under Portuguese rule.

On 4 April 1833, he was created Baron of Sá da Bandeira, on 1 December 1834, he was created Visconde de Sá da Bandeira and on 3 February 1864, he was created Marquês de Sá da Bandeira. He was also a freemason.

=== Views on colonial politics ===
Sá da Bandeira advocated for a liberal model of Portuguese colonialism. His programme included the abolition of slavery (formally enacted in Portuguese territories in 1878), alongside military expansionism to acquire more effective control of the colonies.

He argued that Angola and the other African territories had to become a "new Brazil" to offset the loss of Brazil, following the former colony's independence in 1822. This involved the modernization of their economies and their reorientation toward extractivism, notably through mining and plantation-based agriculture, underpinned by planned Portuguese immigration and free labour.

== See also ==
- Belenzada
- Rossio massacre

Political offices
| Preceded by José Bernardino de Portugal e Castro, Marquis of Valença, and Count of Vimioso | Prime Minister of Portugal; 1836–1837 | Succeeded by António Dias de Oliveira |
| Preceded by António Dias de Oliveira | Prime Minister of Portugal; 1837–1839 | Succeeded by Rodrigo de Almeida Carvalhais, Baron of Ribeira de Sabrosa |
| Preceded by Nuno José de Moura Barreto, Duke of Loulé | Prime Minister of Portugal; 1865 | Succeeded by Joaquim António de Aguiar |
| Preceded by António José de Ávila, 1st Duke of Ávila and Bolama | Prime Minister of Portugal; 1868–1869 | Succeeded by Nuno José de Moura Barreto, Duke of Loulé |
| Preceded by João Francisco de Saldanha; Oliveira e Daun, Duke of Saldanha | Prime Minister of Portugal; 1870 | Succeeded by António José de Ávila, 1st Duke of Ávila and Bolama |
