= Igreja dos Grilos =

Coordinates: 41.1419°N 8.6125°W

- Convento dos Grilos
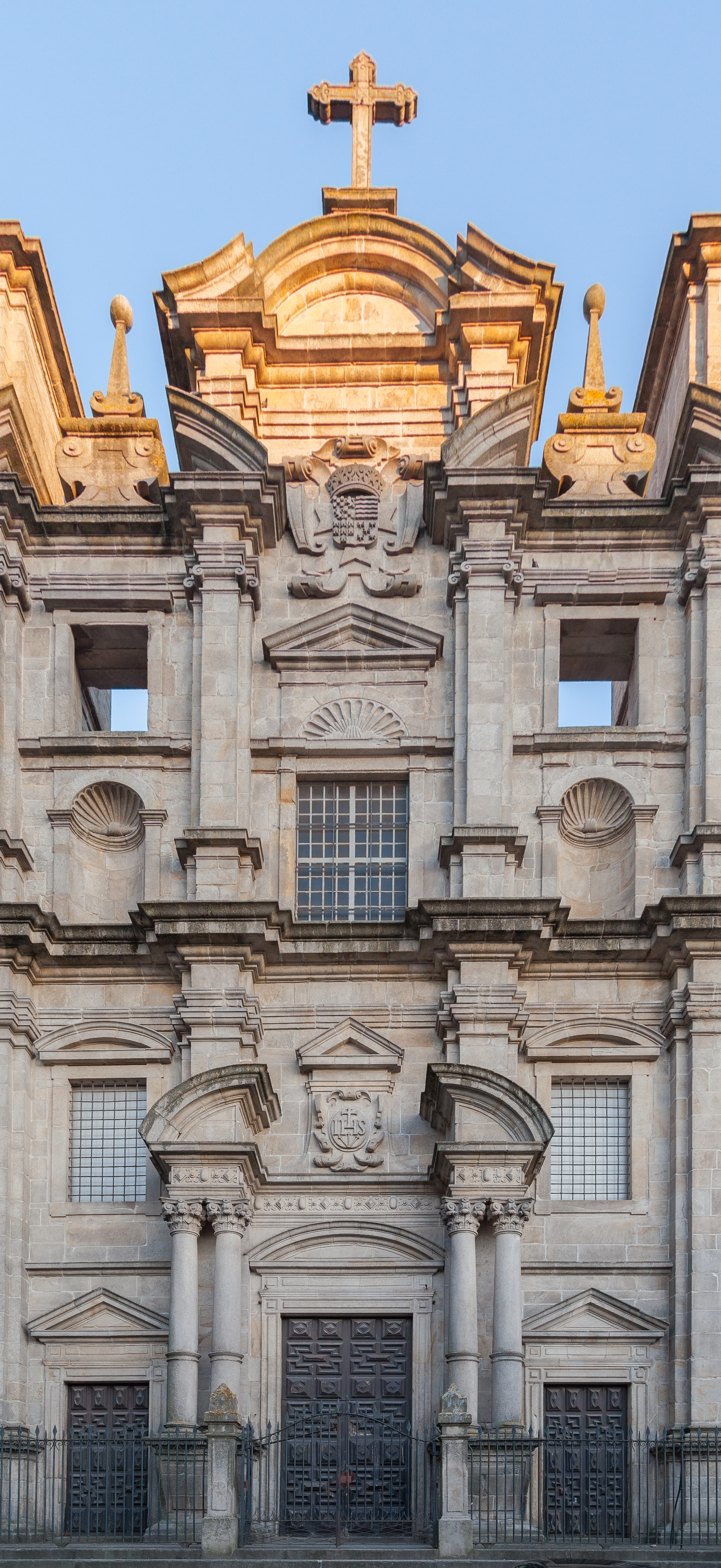
- Facade
- Igreja dos Grilos
- Location: Porto
- Country: Portugal

Igreja dos Grilos is a church and convent in Porto, Portugal.

== History ==
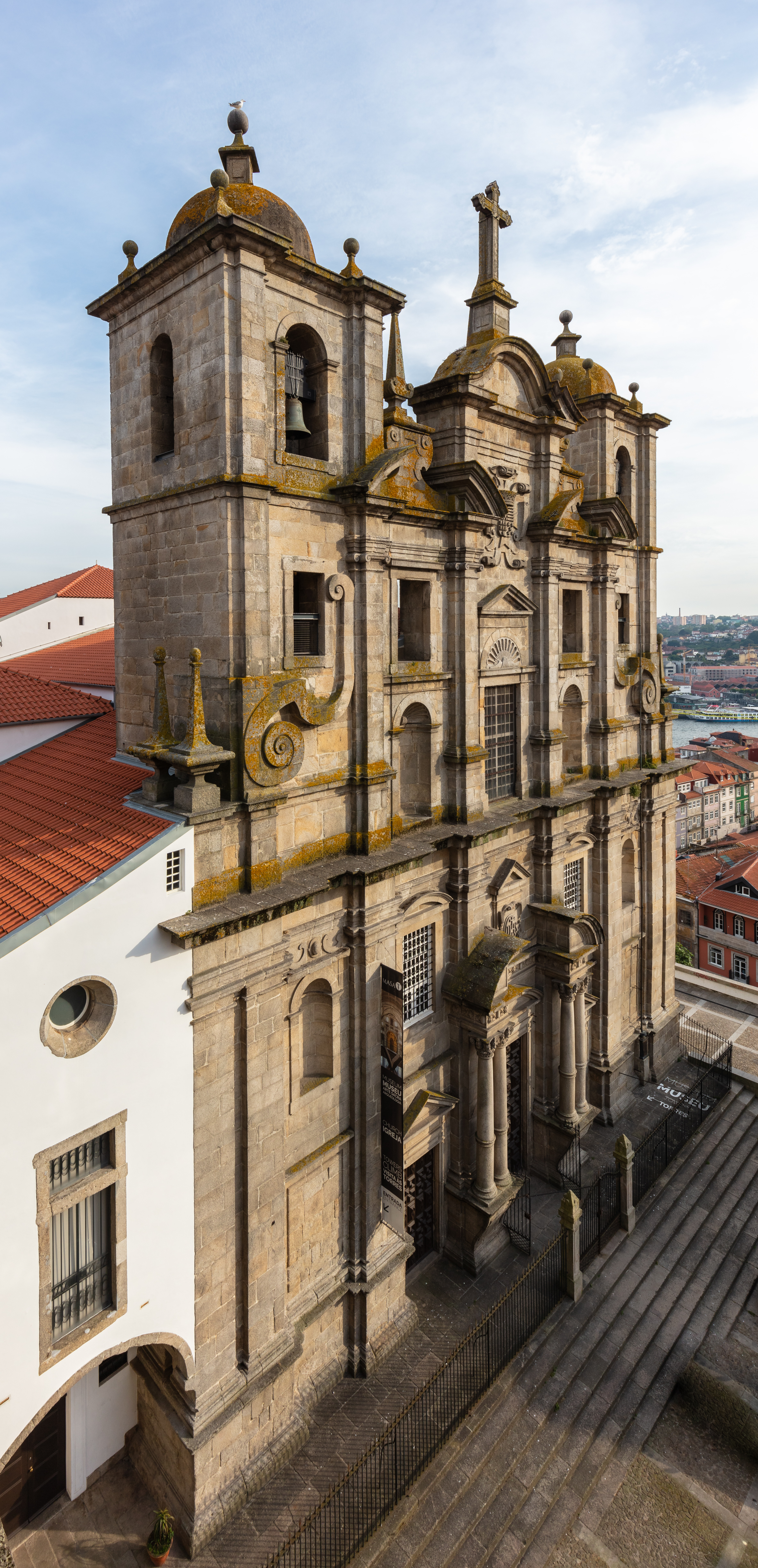
Lateral view

Built by the Jesuits in 1577 Mannerist Baroque-style, funded by donations from the faithful, as well as Frei Luís Álvaro de Távora, who is buried there, the Church and Convent of São Lourenço were built enduring strong opposition from both the Municipal Chamber and the population. However, the followers of St. Ignatius of Loyola finally got the much coveted school which provided free classes - this quickly resulted in a remarkable success.

With the expulsion of the Jesuits in 1759, by order of the Marquis of Pombal, the church was donated to the University of Coimbra until its purchase by the Discalced Friars of the Order of Saint Augustine that were there from 1780 to 1832. These friars came from Spain in 1663, settling initially in Lisbon, at the "site of Cricket" (lugar do Grilo), where they quickly gained the sympathy of the village, earning the name "brothers-crickets" (irmãos-grilos) and thus the name of the church where they fixed residence in Porto.

During the Siege of Porto, the brothers were forced to leave the convent, which later was occupied by the liberal troops of Dom Pedro. The Academic Battalion, integrating Almeida Garrett, settled there.

Today the premises belong to the Seminário Maior do Porto, to which they have belonged since 1834.

== See also ==
- List of churches in Portugal
- List of Jesuit sites
