= Asseiceira =

- Civil parish
- Location in Portugal
- Coordinates: 39.31°N 8.24°W
- Country: Portugal
- Region: Oeste e Vale do Tejo
- Intermunic. comm.: Médio Tejo
- District: Santarém
- Municipality: Tomar

Area
  - Total: 29.08 km^{2} (11.23 sq mi)

Population (2011)
  - Total: 2,943
  - Density: 100/km^{2} (260/sq mi)
- Time zone: UTC+00:00 (WET)
  - Summer (DST): UTC+01:00 (WEST)

Asseiceira is a civil parish (Freguesia) in the municipality of Tomar, Portugal. The population in 2011 was 2,943, in an area of 29.08 km².

It is the location of the Battle of Asseiceira, fought on 16 May 1834, the last and decisive engagement of the Portuguese Civil War.
