= Landing at Mindelo =

1832 incident during the Liberal Wars

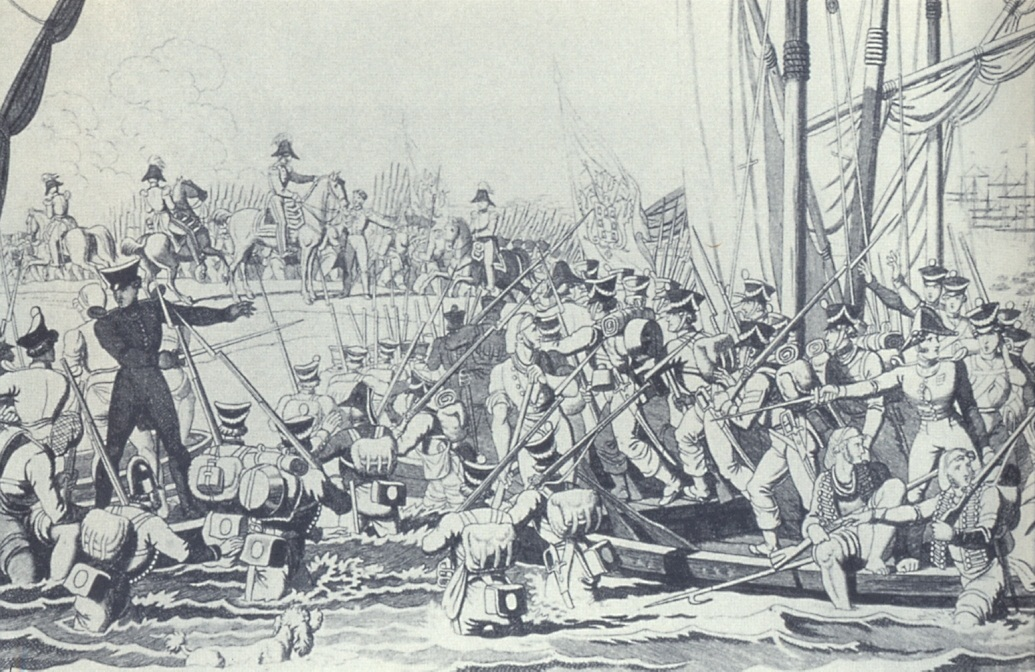
Landing of the liberal forces in Oporto on 8 July 1832

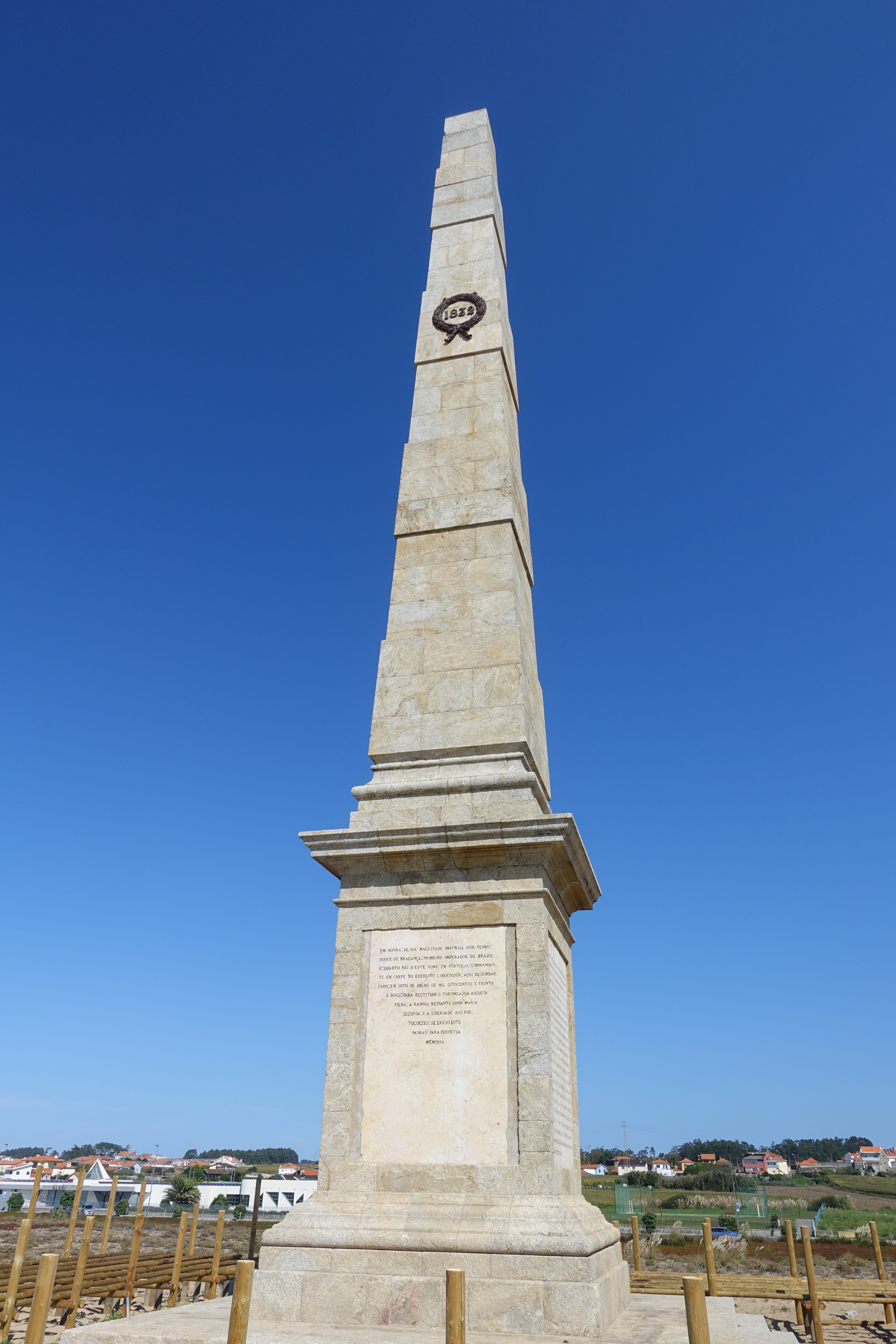
Monument at Pampelido

The landing at Mindelo was a landing of Portuguese Liberal forces north of Porto on 8 July 1832, marking a turning point in the Liberal Wars (1828 - 1834). It took place at the beach near Arnosa de Pampelido, known currently as Praia da Memória (Memory Beach), located between the parishes of Perafita and Lavra in Matosinhos. The landing may have taken the name of Mindelo, a parish located 9 km north of the site, due to the term's historical use to refer to a larger geographical area between the rivers Ave and Leça.

== The landing ==
During the first 4 years of the War, Absolutist forces loyal to Dom Miguel, who had usurped the throne of Portugal, were in control of the Portuguese mainland. While the Liberals loyal to ex-Emperor of Brazil, Dom Pedro Duke of Braganza, controlled the Azores.

On 8 July 1832 a fleet of 60 ships under the command of the British Admiral George Rose Sartorius arrived from the Azores at the Arnosa de Pampelido beach near Mindelo. Some 7500 men came ashore, including António Severin de Noronha Count of Vila Flor, Alexandre Herculano, Almeida Garrett, Joaquim António de Aguiar and José Travassos Valdez. There were also many foreign volunteers: French, Belgian, Polish, Italian, German, Spanish and a British contingent under the command of Colonels George Lloyd Hodges and Charles Shaw. The Army was later called Os Bravos do Mindelo (The Braves of Mindelo).

The Absolutist authorities were caught by surprise and were not able to oppose the landing, nor the occupation of Porto the next day. On 23 July the Liberal Army were able to repulse the Absolutists in the Battle of Ponte Ferreira, but had to fall back on Porto where they were besieged for an entire year.

== Honours ==
The port city on the island of São Vicente in Cape Verde was named Mindelo in 1838 in honour of the Landing at Mindelo.

In 1864, a granite obelisk was inaugurated at the landing site in Praia da Memória (Memory Beach) in memory of the landing. Inscribed in it is a speech attributed to Dom Pedro, which was made before the landing, and a description of the landing.

== Sources ==
- Disembarkation Braves of Mindelo 1832
- 180.º Aniversário do Desembarque do Mindelo
