= April Revolt =

1824 Portuguese-Brazilian absolutist revolt

Flag of United Kingdom of Portugal, Brazil and the Algarves

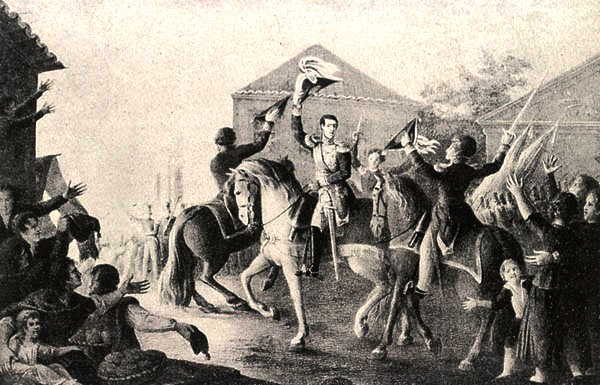
Dom Miguel rides into Bemposta, during the events of the Vilafrancada, declaring his support for absolute monarchy

The April Revolt (Portuguese: Abrilada) was an absolutist political revolt that took place in the United Kingdom of Portugal, Brazil and the Algarves in April 1824. It succeeded the 1823 Vilafrancada and foreshadowed the Liberal Wars which raged from 1828 until 1834.

== History ==
On 30 April 1824, Infante Miguel, who had been appointed generalissimo of the Portuguese Army, had top civilian and military people of the country arrested and placed in the dungeons of the Castle of São Jorge and the Tower of Belém. Among them stood out the figures of the Quartermaster-General of Police, Baron Rendufe, Pedro de Sousa Holstein, 1st Duke of Palmela (then in government in coalition with Manuel Inácio Martins Pamplona Corte Real, 1st Count of Subserra) and the Viscount of Santa Marta. Prince Miguel, who had the support of his mother Carlota Joaquina, considered them guilty of being supporters of liberalism and of his father, King John VI. Miguel's stated intention was to end what he called "pestilential bevy of free-masons", a reference to Freemasonry liberal and constitutional.

Various military corps were then sent to the former Palace of the Inquisition, (where the D. Maria II National Theatre stands today), in Rossio, Lisbon, then installing its headquarters. He then gave orders to besiege the Bemposta Palace, where the King was accompanied by his English adviser, General William Carr Beresford.

The support of John by the diplomatic corps in Portugal was decisive to solve this conflict, in particular the action of the French ambassador Hyde de Neuville. In an attempt at appeasement, one diplomat managed to enter the palace and convince the King to call his son. He achieved, thereby, an agreement that brought back the troops to barracks, but that the detainees remain imprisoned, with the exception of Palmela, who took refuge in a British ship, continuing the political and military instability.

In May, diplomats helped King John VI to take refuge on the British ship Windsor Castle, where he took a series of measures: he deposed Prince Miguel from his position as head of the Army, ordered the release of political prisoners and the capture of the supporters of his son, who was summoned to come aboard. Once detained, D. Miguel was forced to embark for France in the frigate Pearl, putting an end to the uprising of Miguelists. The Infante was deported from there to Vienna, and Queen Carlota Joaquina, was placed under house arrest in the Palace of Queluz.
