= Rodrigo Pinto Pizarro =

Portuguese politician and baron

His Lordship The Baron of Ribeira de Sabrosa
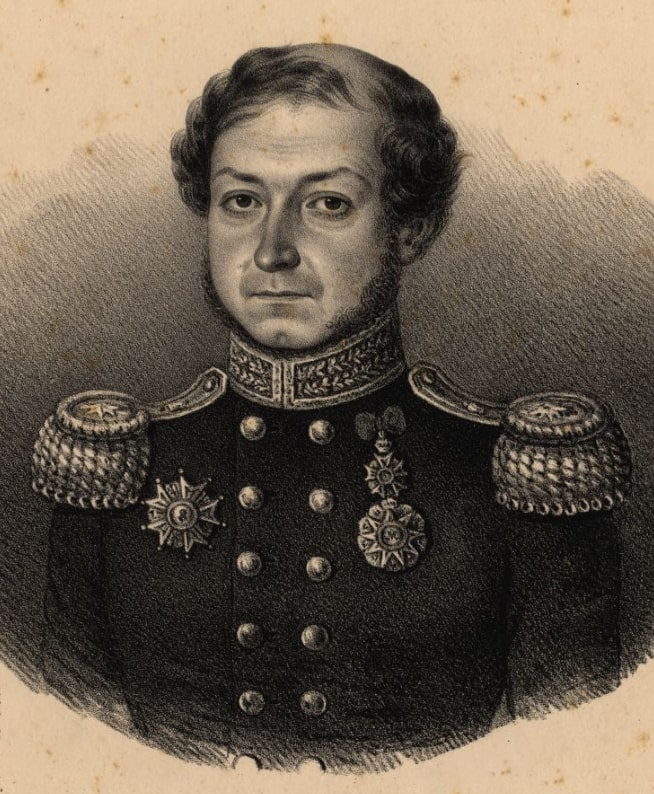

Prime Minister of Portugal
- In office 18 April 1839 – 26 November 1839
- Monarchs: Maria II and Fernando II
- Preceded by: Bernardo de Sá Nogueira de Figueiredo, 1st Marquis of Sá da Bandeira
- Succeeded by: José Travassos Valdez, 1st Count of Bonfim

Rodrigo Pinto Pizarro Pimentel de Almeida Carvalhais was a Portuguese baron and the President of the Council of Ministers of the Kingdom of Portugal from 18 April to 26 November 1839. He was the 1st Baron of Ribeira de Sabrosa.

Political offices
Preceded by Bernardo de Sá Nogueira de Figueiredo, 1st Marquis of Sá da Bandeira	President of the Council of Ministers of the Kingdom of Portugal; 1839	Succeeded by José Travassos Valdez, 1st Count of Bonfim
