= António Dias de Oliveira =

Portuguese politician

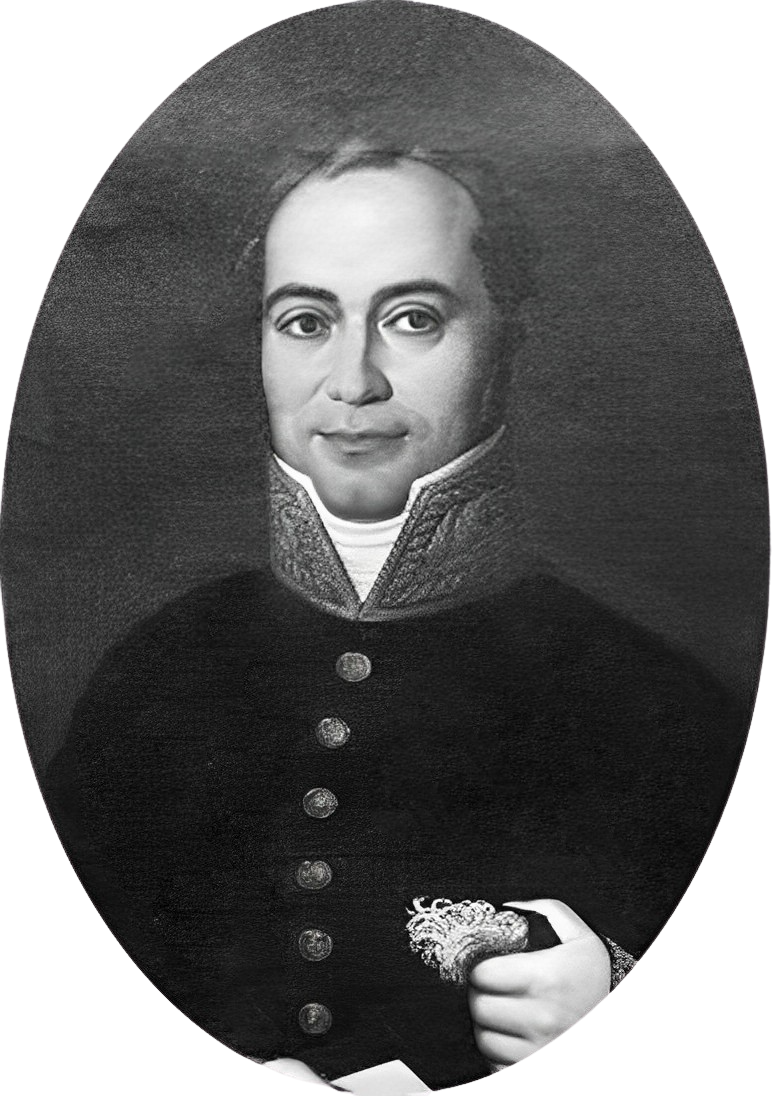

President of the Council of Ministers of the Kingdom of Portugal
- In office 2 June 1837 – 10 August 1837
- Monarch: Maria II of Portugal
- Preceded by: Bernardo de Sá Nogueira de Figueiredo, 1st Marquis of Sá da Bandeira
- Succeeded by: Bernardo de Sá Nogueira de Figueiredo, 1st Marquis of Sá da Bandeira

Personal details
- Born: 23 June 1804 Valongo
- Died: 20 April 1883 (aged 78)

António Dias de Oliveira (23 June 1804 – 20 April 1883) was the President of the Council of Ministers of the Kingdom of Portugal from 2 June to 10 August 1837.

Political offices
Preceded by Bernardo de Sá Nogueira de Figueiredo, 1st Marquis of Sá da Bandeira	President of the Council of Ministers of the Kingdom of Portugal; 1837	Succeeded by Bernardo de Sá Nogueira de Figueiredo, 1st Marquis of Sá da Bandeira
