= William Nugent Glascock =

Irish Royal Navy officer and novelist (1787–1847)

Captain William Nugent Glascock
- Born: c. 1787
- Died: 9 October 1847; Baltinglass, Ireland
- Military career
- Allegiance: United Kingdom
- Branch: Royal Navy
- Service years: 1800–1855
- Rank: Captain
- Commands: HMS Carnation; HMS Drake; HMS Orestes; HMS Tyne
- Conflicts: French Revolutionary Wars; Napoleonic Wars; Battle of Cape Finisterre; Walcheren Campaign

William Nugent Glascock (c. 1787– 9 October 1847) was an Irish officer in the Royal Navy and a novelist. He saw service during the French Revolutionary and Napoleonic Wars, and later in the years of relative peace.

== Early life ==
Glascock was born about 1787 in Baltinglass, County Wicklow, and joined the navy in January 1800, serving aboard the frigate HMS Glenmore under Captain George Duff. In January 1801 Duff transferred to the 74-gun third rate ship of the line HMS Courageaux and took Glascock with him. Glascock spent the next few years with Duff seeing service in the Baltic, off the coast of Ireland and in the West Indies. In 1803 he was appointed to the newly built 74-gun HMS Colossus and afterwards to the 90-gun HMS Barfleur, in which he took part in the Battle of Cape Finisterre on 22 July 1805, and later in the blockade of Brest under Admiral William Cornwallis. In November 1808 he was promoted to lieutenant of HMS Dannemark, and served in her at the reduction of Flushing in August 1809. In 1812 he was a lieutenant of the 74-gun HMS Clarence in the Bay of Biscay.

== Post-war and first commands ==
Glascock afterwards served in a number of frigates on the home station, successively HMS Tiber, HMS Madagascar, and HMS Maeander, and in the 32-gun HMS Sir Francis Drake, flagship of Sir Charles Hamilton on the Newfoundland Station. He was promoted from her to the command of the sloop HMS Carnation in November 1818. In 1819 he commanded the brig HMS Drake, from which he was obliged to resign as an invalid. In 1830 Glascock was appointed to the sloop HMS Orestes, which he commanded on the home station during 1831, but in 1832 he was sent to the coast of Portugal, and during the latter months of the year was stationed in the Douro, for the protection of British interests in the disturbed state of the country during the Liberal Wars.

Glascock continued in the Douro, as senior officer, for nearly a year, during which time his conduct under troublesome and often difficult circumstances won for him the approval of the Admiralty and promotion to post-rank, on 3 June 1833, accompanied by a special and complimentary letter from Sir James Graham, the first lord. He did not, however, leave the Douro until the following September, and on 1 October he paid off the Orestes. From April 1843 to January 1847 he commanded the frigate HMS Tyne on the Mediterranean station, and during the following months was employed in Ireland as an inspector under the Poor Relief Act. He died suddenly on 8 October 1847 at Baltinglass. He was married and left children.

== Writing career ==
Glascock devoted the long intervals of half-pay, both as commander and captain, to writing, and produced several volumes of naval novels, anecdotes, reminiscences, and reflections. His biographer in the Dictionary of National Biography, J. K. Laughton remarked that "as novels, [they] are stupid enough, and in their historical parts have little value, but are occasionally interesting as social sketches of naval life in the early part of the century."

Glascock wrote a two-volume work, The Naval Sketch Book, or The Service Afloat and Ashore, published in 1826. This was followed by the three-volume Sailors and Saints, or Matrimonial Manœuvres in 1829, Tales of a Tar, with Characteristic Anecdotes in 1836, and the three-volume Land Sharks and Sea Gulls in 1838. He also wrote a two-volume work entitled Naval Service, or Officers' Manual, published in 1836. This useful manual for young officers passed through four editions in England. The last, published in 1859, had a short advertisement by Glascock's daughter, stating that "the work has been translated into French, Russian, Swedish, and Turkish, and adopted by the navies of those powers, as well as by that of the United States." Laughton remarked that the work was "of course, quite obsolete, though still interesting to the student of naval history and customs."

== See also ==
- O'Byrne, William Richard (1849). "Glascock, William Nugent" . A Naval Biographical Dictionary . John Murray – via Wikisource.
- William Richard O'Byrne (1830) Tales of a Tar full text
