= Rossio massacre =

Military action in Portugal

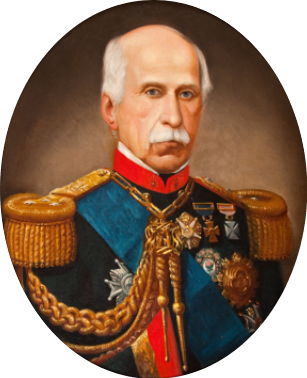
Marquês de Sá da Bandeira

The Rossio Massacre (Portuguese: ‘massacre do Rossio’) took place on the evening of 13 March 1838, when forces loyal to the Portuguese government of Prime Minister Sá da Bandeira put down a revolt by radical sections of the National Guard and their supporters, who were gathered in Rossio Square in central Lisbon. Around 100 people were killed, and an unknown number injured. Contemporary accounts agree on the events leading up to the massacre, but differ in their description of how it took place and who the victims were.

== Background ==
The leaders of the National Guard were closely connected with the opposition press and the radical liberal political clubs of Lisbon. The September Revolution had taken place when the National Guard, assembled illegally in Rossio Square, had thrown its support behind the crowds of Lisbon calling for a restoration of the Constitution of 1822. This constitution had provided for a single legislative chamber and direct elections on a relatively broad franchise. The Constitutional Charter of 1826, in force at the time of the September Revolution, involved indirect elections that could easily be manipulated by the government, and an upper chamber, the House of Peers.

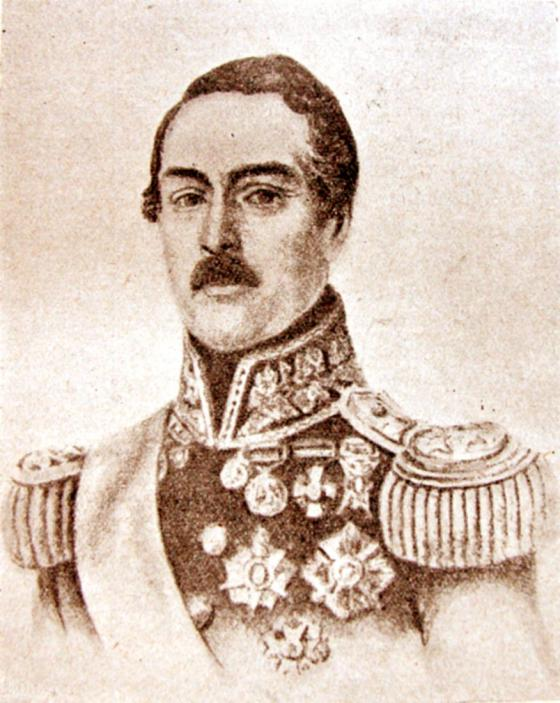
Conde de Bonfim

The National Guard had also been ready to defend the September Revolution in November 1836, when the Belenzada palace coup had threatened to overthrow the government. In response, Sá da Bandeira had mustered the National Guard at the Campo de Ourique and made ready to march on the royal palace of Belém. While the coup was underway, it was a member of the National Guard who had shot and killed Agostinho José Freire. No one was ever brought to justice for this murder and this impunity was a source of deep unease to many ministers and members of the Constituent Congress.

In March 1838 the Congress was debating the electoral system to be followed under the new draft constitution, which included the question of whether the vote should be taken away from those who had enjoyed it since 1822. As debates wore on, public unrest grew over the slow progress towards a new constitution and the ineffectiveness of the government.

== Revolt of the National Guard ==
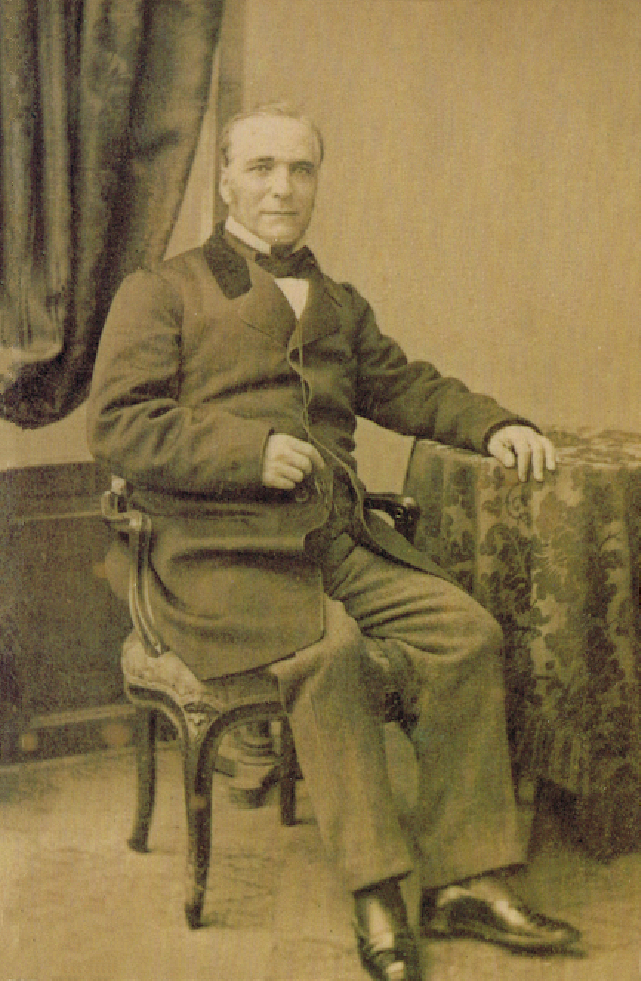
Costa Cabral

Matters eventually came to a head with the resignation of the War Minister, the Baron de Bonfim. The radical clubs and the National Guard feared that this would allow Queen Maria II to appoint a new cabinet that would reimpose the Constitutional Charter of 1826. This, they agreed, would be a betrayal of the September Revolution.

On 4 March 1838 the civil governor of Lisbon and commander of the National Guard, Francisco Soares Caldeira, invited the corps commanders to sign a petition asking the Queen not to appoint any ministers who were not loyal to the values of the September Revolution. Although most refused, the Arsenal battalion led by Ricardo José Rodrigues França agreed. The following day the battalion sent a statement to the Constituent Congress announcing their loyalty to the Queen and their lack of confidence in the government.

On 8 March it became known that on the previous day the Queen had dismissed Soares Caldeira and replaced him as civil Governor of Lisbon with António Bernardo da Costa Cabral. In protest, on the morning of 9 March, the insurrectionary Guard battalions under França occupied the Arsenal building. Government troops under the Baron de Bonfim were ordered from the Largo da Estrela down into the city, where they surrounded the Arsenal. To avoid fighting both sides agreed to talks.

== The Convention of Marcos Filipe ==
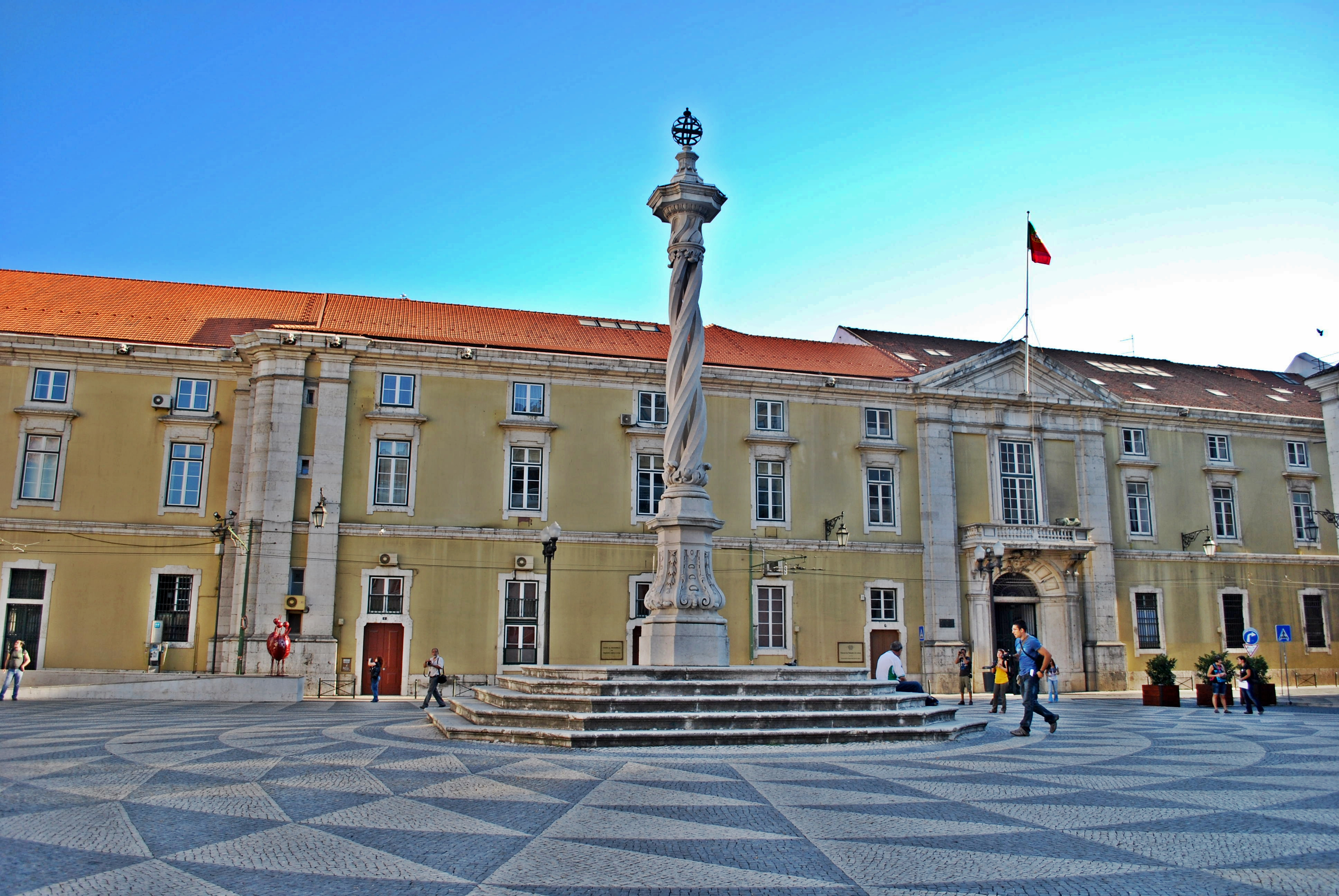
The Arsenal building in Lisbon

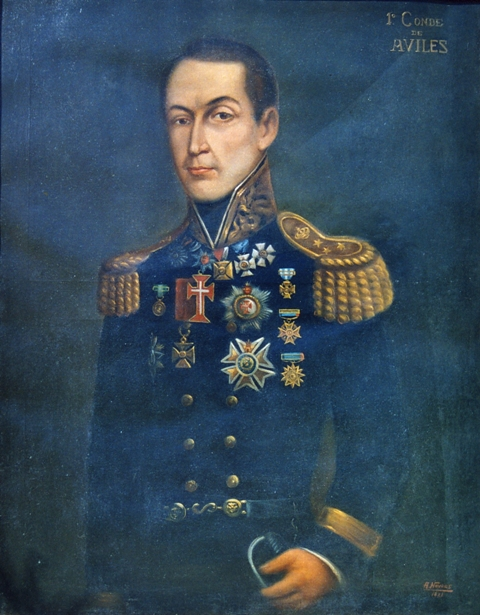
Visconde do Reguengo

Discussions took place between França and the Visconde do Reguengo in a coffee house across the street from the Arsenal named the Marcos Filipe after its late owner. The agreement they reached was therefore known as "the Convention of Marcos Filipe." It contained four points:

- the rebels would leave the Arsenal at 3pm.
- a guard would remain at the door of the Arsenal, chosen from the National Guard
- as soon as the rebels marched away, the government troops would do the same
- no action would be taken against those taking part in the day's events.

With this agreement, the National Guard left the Arsenal accompanied by a large number of people cheering França and Caldeira, and marched to Rossio Square, where they dispersed. However that evening Sá da Bandeira dismissed França and abolished the rebellious battalions of the Guard as well. On the morning of 10 March large numbers of angry guardsmen gathered near the Arsenal claiming that the dismissal of França and the dissolution of the Arsenal battalion violated the Convention.

On 12 March Costa Cabral had a further meeting with França, at which França demanded again to be reinstated and claimed that the people of Lisbon were determined to keep him. His associates insisted that restoring him to his post was the only means of averting a revolution. Costa Cabral therefore advised the government that the National Guard remained hostile, a general uprising was being prepared and that armed force would ultimately be necessary to reassert control. The government made plans accordingly.

== Uprising on 13 March ==
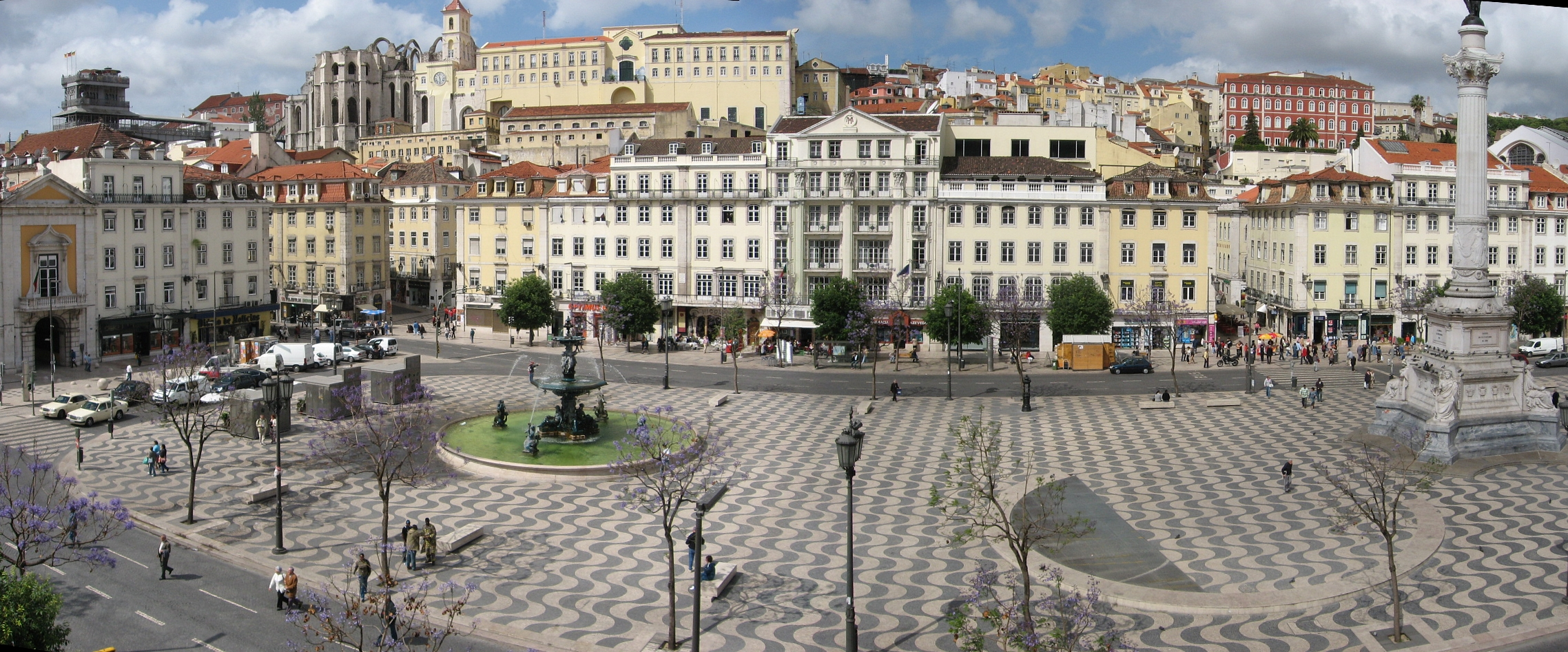
Rossio Square

Early in the morning of 13 March, a call to quarters for the National Guard was sounded in the streets of Lisbon. Battalions of the National Guard began marching towards the royal palace, demanding the reinstatement of França. The government was prepared this time. A proclamation from the Queen convened the Constituent Chamber in the Necessidades Palace at eight o’clock in the morning, where it unanimously voted to support the government against the uprising. Government forces under the command of Bonfim, Reguengo and Sá da Bandeira himself gathered in the Largo da Estrela, from where they could defend both the Cortes building (the São Bento Palace) and the royal family in the Necessidades Palace.

In the fighting that followed, several lives were lost on both sides. The National Guard was dislodged from its positions in the Convent of Jesus, in front of the São Bento Palace, and retreated to the top of the convent of Graça with six pieces of artillery. Here they were confronted by between 600 and 1,000 government troops. There was some hand-to-hand skirmishing between the men on both sides, but nobody opened fire.

Sá da Bandeira met with the rebels and tried to persuade them to disband. Costa Cabral went further and ventured among the guardsmen to remonstrate with them. He barely escaped without injury. In the end, according to one source, the rebels agreed to give up their position, march down to Rossio Square and surrender their weapons. According to another, they agreed to disband only on condition that they could return to their homes with their weapons.

== Events in Rossio Square ==
Soldiers under the command of the Conde de Bonfim already controlled the streets surrounding Rossio Square. Once the guardsmen reached the square, according to one account, ‘certain anarchists’ encountered the Conde de Reguengo and his officials, and opened fire on them with shotguns. At this, fighting broke out again and the National Guard, easily defeated, fled as night fell, throwing their weapons aside as they ran.

According to another source, the guardsmen were marching down from Graça and had reached the end of the Rua dos Cavaleiros where they encountered a squadron of troops under Sá da Bandeira. A dispute broke over whether the guardsmen should continue to march in formation; Sá da Bandeira refused to allow them to do so, and among the ranks of the guardsmen there were calls to open fire on him. Eventually they were allowed to march on to Rossio Square in formation as they demanded, but once they reached the square, a large number of them did not disperse.

Then, as night was falling, a squadron of cavalry appeared in the square from the Travessa de São Domingos. A shot was fired, by the National Guard according to some, and by government troops according to others, as the shot came from their direction. At the same time, a company of the Municipal Guard, coming from the Rua da Palma, hurriedly fired en masse, hitting mainly the masses of people who had gathered in the square out of curiosity, or were merely going about their business. Shooting then broke out on both sides, with the guardsmen firing off two rounds from the artillery-pieces they had brought down with them from Graça. Eventually, after many casualties, the confusion, noise and darkness allowed those in the square to escape their several ways.

According to the account given to the Constituent Congress by Sá da Bandeira himself, the government thought it essential to deal with the rebel threat before nightfall, when the guardsmen might be reinforced, or fortify their positions, making it much harder to disperse them. He too had ventured among the rebels at Graça, and had been well-received by them. Indeed, they had asked him to accompany them in their way down to Rossio, and he had marched in front of them on their way. In this way two battalions of the National Guard reached Rossio, where Sá da Bandeira invited their commanders into a house to meet with him and agree how best they could be quickly dispersed, with everyone returning peacefully to his house. While they were discussing this, musket shots were heard outside, and the meeting ended. According to Sá da Bandeira, the National Guard had opened fire on the vanguard of the government troops, who were marching away on the understanding that the day's events were over. His account provided no further details of the event or of the dead and wounded.

== Aftermath ==
The formal government response to the uprising did not concentrate on its armed nature or on the deaths and injuries, but on the unarguable illegality of the National Guard assembling against the express orders of the Queen. Efforts were made to ascertain which of its commanders had been behind this critical step, and who had been present at meetings where it was discussed, but the commanders themselves gave evasive and unhelpful answers. Having put down the rebels, Costa Cabral was careful not to further inflame feeling among other battalions, which would potentially make matters even more difficult for the government. It was therefore decided not to make any arrests or bring charges against any of the Guard commanders, but to refer the matter to a commission of the Lisbon City Council, which should review the membership and organisation of the corps. However, by June Costa Cabral himself had concluded that the City Council lacked the legal authority to undertake this task. There was a further, but much less serious, incident involving elements of the National Guard on 14 June 1838 during the Corpus Christi procession.

The Constituent Congress quickly concluded its business, and the Queen swore an oath to the new Portuguese Constitution of 1838 on 4 April. On the same day she invested Costa Cabral with the Order of the Immaculate Conception of Vila Viçosa. Reguengo and Bonfim were both granted the title of count. As well as rewarding her loyal commanders, the Queen also forgave some of her enemies, granting an amnesty to all acts since 10 September 1836 "calculated to destroy the institutions proclaimed by the nation at that period, to disturb order, and to treat the Royal authority with disrespect". With this, the two exiled army marshals Palmela and Saldanha returned to Lisbon. The amnesty specifically excluded ‘revolutionary acts’ as well as those perpetrated by Miguelist rebels.

Bonfim became prime minister in 1839. and Costa Cabral led a coup 1842 which overthrew the constitutional order he had defended at Rossio.

What became of Francisco Soares Caldeira and Ricardo José Rodrigues França is not known.

== Historical assessments ==
- "Death, injury and the sad disappointment of its ineptitude were the fruits of this bold attempt, and if the number of victims on that day cannot be known for certain, this is the result of the interest that Portuguese constitutionalists have in obscuring the consequences of a political schism which will bring them eternal opprobrium." (R. J. O. Guimaraens, ‘Revista historica de Portugal: desde a morte de D. Joao VI. até o fallecimento do imperador D. Pedro, 1846)
- "The Rossio massacre came to symbolise the exercise of power by democrats. Starting off with absurd ideals, they created a situation of ungovernability, requiring the use of force." (Fundação para Estudos e Formação Política do PSD, 2016)
- "The so-called ‘Revolt of the Arsenalists’ showed that the radical faction in the Lisbon National Guard, although active and organised, was only a minority. After the suppression of its most radical battalions the Lisbon National Guard became a mere instrument of the government and ceased to have the capacity for political interventions. Its defeat constituted an important moment in the revolution because it indicated the end of any possibility of the liberal left regaining power." (Arnaldo Pata, Revoluçao e Cidadania. Organização, Funcionamento e Ideologia da Guarda Nacional (1820-39), 2011)
- "The resumption of negotiations [with Britain about ending the slave trade] was due partly to... the drastic loss of strength, after the events of 13 March, with the Rossio massacre, of the popular Septembrist movement, nationalistic and anti-British, in the National Guard."
