= Battle of Asseiceira =

1834 final battle of the Portuguese Civil War

- Part of Liberal Wars
Date	16 May, 1834
Location	Asseiceira, Portugal
Result	Loyalist victory

Belligerents
Loyalists	Miguelites

Commanders and leaders
Duke of Terceira	Viscount of Montalegre

Strength
More than 6,000 infantry about 500 cavalry about 11 cannons	5,500 infantry 500 cavalry 12 cannons

Casualties and losses
About 400 dead or wounded	2,900 dead or wounded 1,400 captured

The Battle of Asseiceira, fought on 16 May, 1834, was the last and decisive engagement of the Portuguese Civil War, or "War of the Two Brothers", between Dom Pedro, ex-Emperor of Brazil (fighting to restore his daughter Dona Maria da Glória as rightful Queen of Portugal) and the usurper Dom Miguel. Dom Miguel's rebel forces were defeated.

Miguel's army, under the command of General Guedes, had been retreating eastward before the advance of Dom Pedro's forces, and had camped in a strong position on the Heights of Asseiceira, a system of hills and valleys about four miles from Tomar. Miguel himself was at Santarém and was not involved in the ensuing battle. Pedro's general, the Duke of Terceira, advanced from Tomar on the morning of the 16th and attacked their position in three columns commanded by Colonels Queirós, Nepomuceno and Vasconcelos.

The Miguelite forces attempted to repel them with artillery bombardment and cavalry charges but the loyalist forces persisted in their attacks and eventually a charge by their own cavalry carried the heights. Many of the enemy were killed or wounded, their guns captured, and some 1400 men taken prisoner. The remainder fled towards Golegã, which was occupied by Terceira the following day. Dom Pedro (already ill with the sickness that would kill him shortly after his final victory) arrived there on the 18th from Cartaxo. Miguel rallied his forces at Évora, but his officers were unwilling to risk a final battle after nearly two years of warfare, and he was presently induced to seek terms of capitulation. The war would finally end ten days later with the signing of the Concession of Evoramonte, where Dom Miguel surrendered and abandoned his claim to the Portuguese throne, being also banished from the kingdom.

== Sources ==
- An Account of the War in Portugal, between Dom Pedro and Dom Miguel by Admiral Charles Napier (London, 1836); the battle is described on pp. 199–203.
