= HMS Orestes (1824) =

British 18-gun sloop

HMS Orestes was a 18-gun sloop built and launched at Portsmouth Dockyard in May 1824. The vessel became the fifth ship to carry the name Orestes, named after the Greek mythological figure who was the son of Agamemnon and Clytemnestra. Ordered on 21 May 1821 and laid down in April 1823, the sloop was designed by shipbuilder, James Inman.

== Career ==
=== Halifax, Nova Scotia, 1826-1830 ===
HMS Orestes did not encounter any conflict whilst at Halifax, Nova Scotia, spending most of its stationing delivering supplies to Miramichi, Canada and mail to Bermuda.

=== Portuguese Civil War, 1832 ===
HMS Orestes was part of a naval squadron sent to Portugal to protect British trade interests and its citizens, following the beginnings of conflict between Dom Pedro and his brother, Dom Miguel in what became known as the Portuguese Civil War (Liberal Wars).

Under the command of Captain William Nugent Glascock, HMS Orestes and the rest of the naval squadron were stationed on the Douro, an area key to the conflict. The positioning of the squadron meant naval vessels faced dangers both sides, leaving them vulnerable to being caught in the cross fire of the conflict.

=== Cape of Good Hope Station, 1848-1852 ===
HMS Orestes spent a short time on the Cape of Good Hope Station, South Africa, protecting British colonial interests with India.

== Figurehead ==
The figurehead of Orestes is a simple male bust wearing a helmet, tunic and classical armour to represent the Greek figure of the same name.

It can be seen on display at the National Museum of the Royal Navy, Portsmouth.

== Conversion ==
In 1852, the sloop was converted from sail to steam, becoming a coal depot and losing the name ‘Orestes’ to become C28. The ship was later sold in 1911 for commercial use.
