= Álvaro Xavier da Fonseca Coutinho e Póvoas =

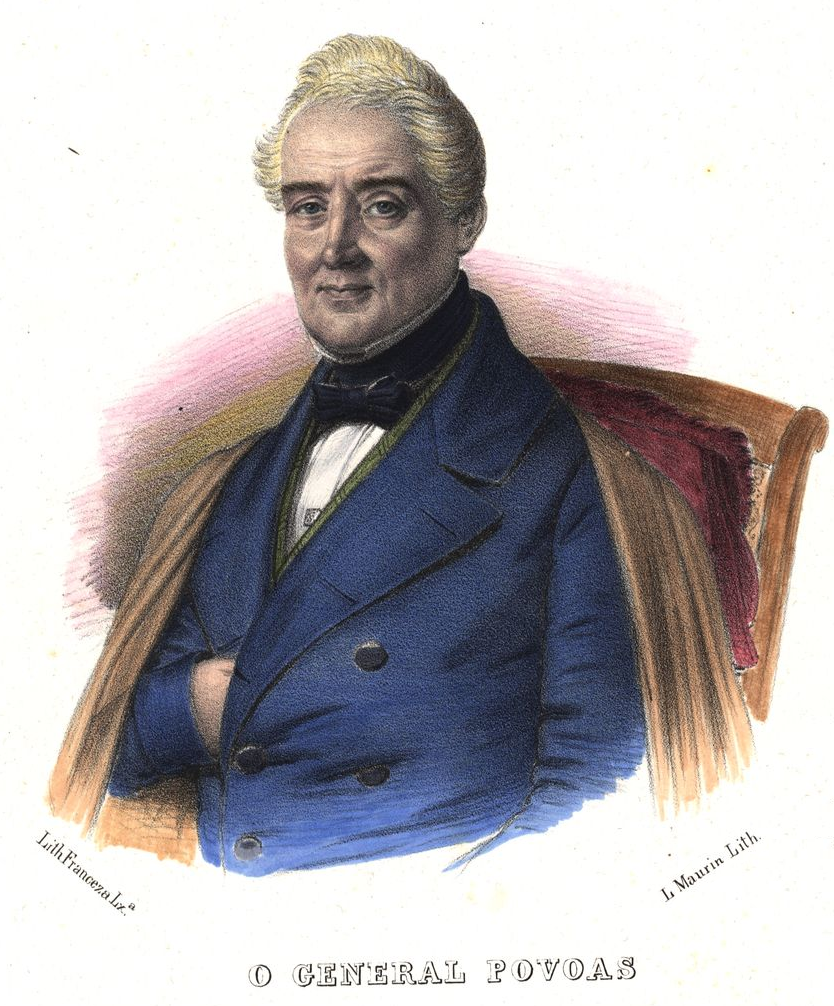
General Póvoas in 1848

Álvaro Xavier da Fonseca Coutinho e Póvoas (Guarda 7 September 1773 – Guarda 29 November 1852), was a Portuguese military officer and noble, who served on the Miguelist side in Portugal's Liberal Wars.

Born in an aristocratic family, he joined the Portuguese Legion in 1808, but defected one year later to the Portuguese-British army. He fought against the French as Lieutenant colonel, and ended the war in 1815 as Brigadier general.

In 1828, at the outbreak of the civil war between Dom Miguel and his elder brother, the former Emperor Dom Pedro I of Brazil, he joined the Miguelite, Absolutist camp.
He suppressed a Liberal uprising in Porto in 1828 and distinguished himself at the Siege of Porto in 1832, where he won the Battle of Souto Redondo. On 20 December 1833, he became a supreme commander of the Miguelite army, but when he lost the Battle of Almoster on 18 February 1834, he was relieved of command and replaced by general José António Azevedo e Lemos.

After the war ended, he was dismissed from the army in 1834 and retreated from public life in his native Guarda. Aged 73, he took up arms once more during the Patuleia in 1846–1847. He died in 1852.
