= Luís Vaz Pereira Pinto Guedes =

Portuguese soldier

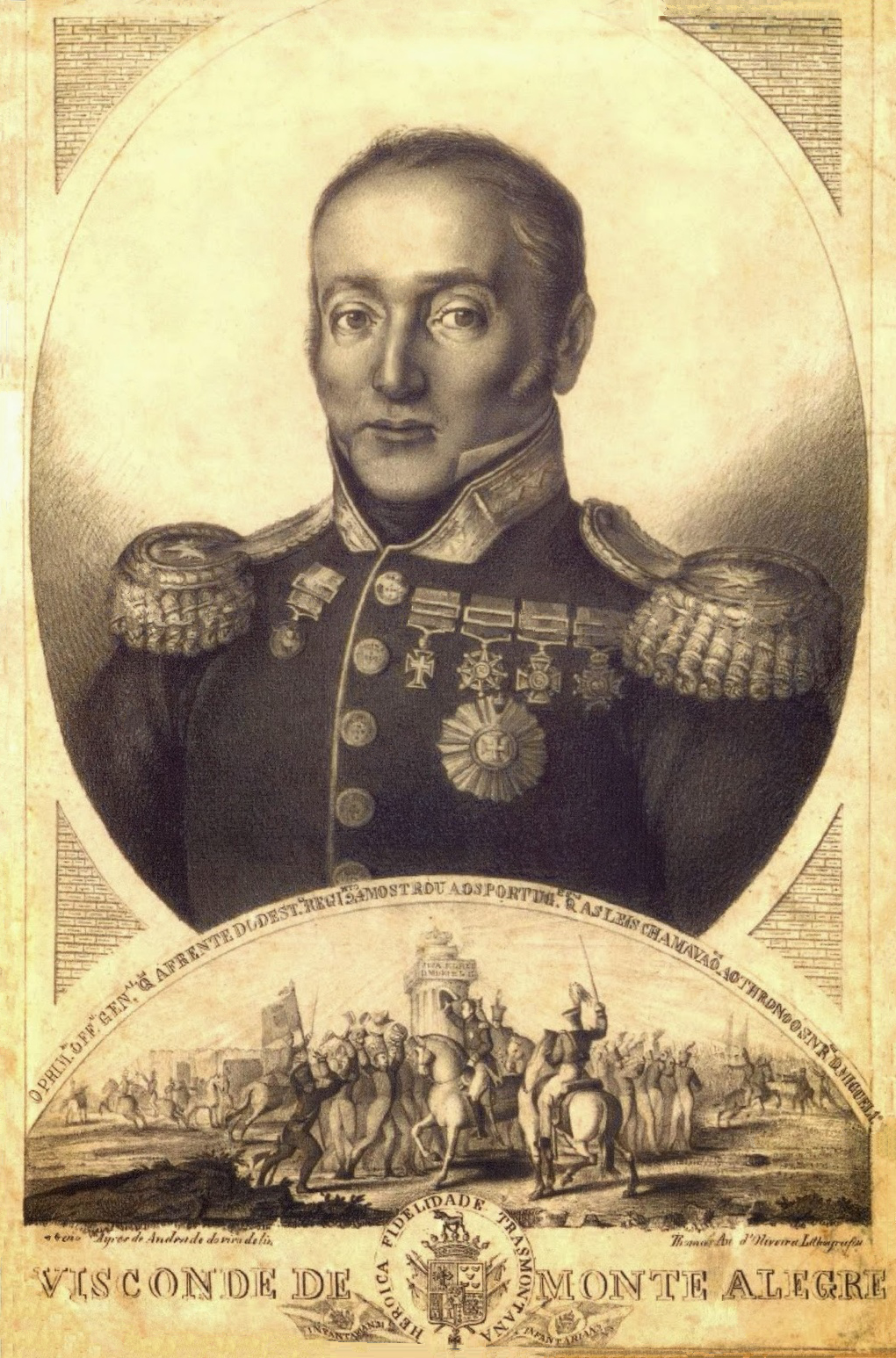
- Luís Vaz Pereira Pinto Guedes, 2nd Viscount of Montalegre
- Born: 18 August 1770; Vila Real, Kingdom of Portugal
- Died: 10 May 1841 (aged 70); Kingdom of Portugal
- Military career
- Allegiance: Kingdom of Portugal
- Branch: Portuguese Army
- Service years: 1784–1834
- Rank: Brigadier
- Conflicts: Peninsular War; Liberal Wars; Battle of Ponte Ferreira; Battle of Asseiceira
- Awards: Campaign Cross of the Peninsular War; Comendador of the Order of Christ; Comendador of the Order of the Tower and Sword

Luís Vaz Pereira Pinto Guedes, 2nd Viscount of Montalegre (18 August 1770 – 10 May 1841) was a Portuguese soldier, who served on the absolutist side in Portugal's Liberal Wars.

He was born in Vila Real, on August 10, 1770, and became a member of the Royal Household ("moço-fidalgo") by a decree of December 20, 1778.

He succeeded his father-in-law as 2nd Viscount of Montalegre by a royal decree of July 3, 1823.

As the military commander in Trás-os-Montes in 1823, he raised a rebellion in the name of the absolutist prince, Infante Dom Miguel of Portugal. During the civil war between Dom Miguel and his elder brother, the former Emperor Dom Pedro I of Brazil, he was a prominent Miguelite general: he was in joint command of the Miguelite army at the Battle of Ponte Ferreira, and was the Miguelite commander at the Battle of Asseiceira in which Miguel's cause was finally defeated.

After the war ended, he was cashiered from the army in 1834. He wrote memoirs justifying his actions, and died in 1841.
