= Battle of Ponte Ferreira =

1832 battle of the Portuguese Civil War

Coordinates: 41°11′N 8°30′W

- Part of Liberal Wars
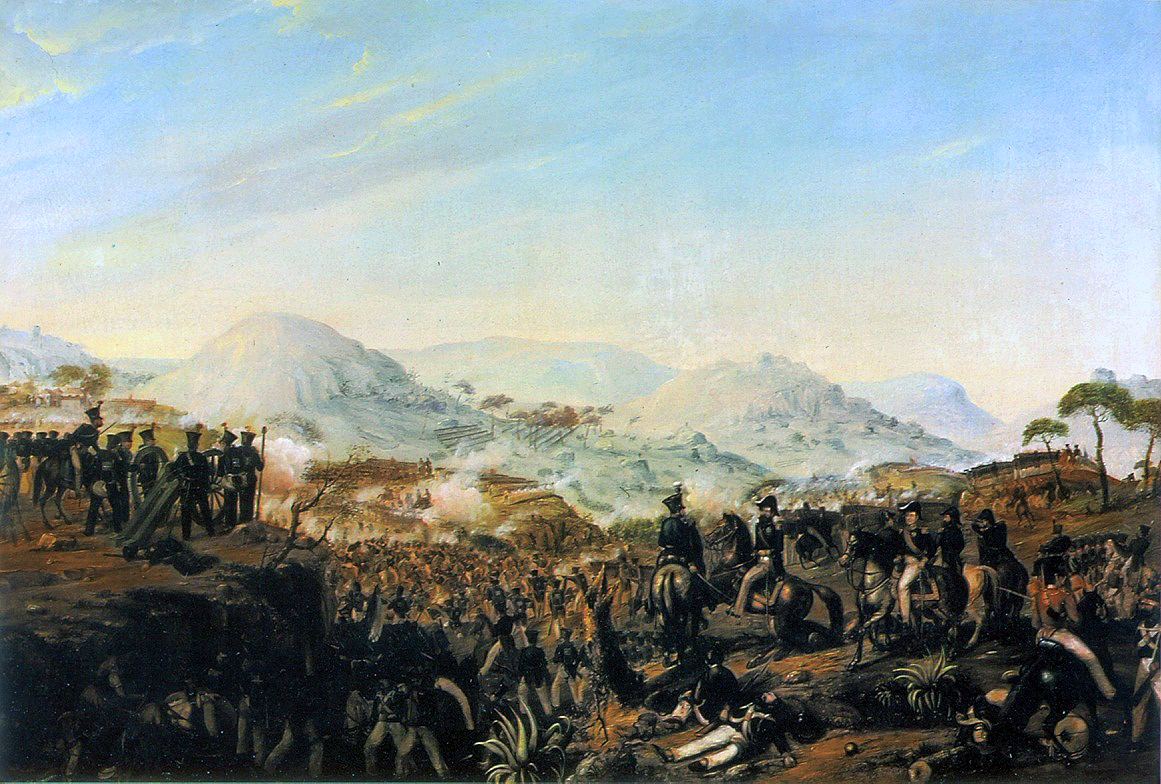
- Battle of Ferreira Bridge
Date	23 July 1832
Location	Ponte Ferreira, near Valongo
Result	Inconclusive

Belligerents
Liberals	Miguelites

Commanders and leaders
Duke of Terceira	Viscount of Montalegre; General Cardoso

Strength
6,000	15,000

Casualties and losses
440 dead and wounded	1,500 dead and wounded

The Battle of Ponte Ferreira, fought on 22–23 July 1832, was the first major battle of the Portuguese Civil War between the forces of Dom Pedro, ex-Emperor of Brazil and Regent for his daughter Maria da Glória, and the army of his brother Dom Miguel, who had usurped the throne of Portugal. Though technically a victory for Pedro's forces, it gave him no lasting advantage because the enemy were not pursued and were able to return in full strength, as a result of which he was besieged in Porto for an entire year.

== Background ==
Dom Pedro's expeditionary force from the Azores landed in Portugal on 7 July 1832 and on the 9th he occupied Porto as the city had been abandoned by the Miguelite army, which withdrew across the river Douro. Though this was a bold stroke, Pedro and his advisers had been under the impression that the peasantry and Miguel's army would at once declare allegiance to their rightful queen, and nothing of the sort happened. Though the Count of Vila Flor urged him to take the offensive, their forces delayed for several days in Porto resting and reorganizing. Meanwhile, the Miguelite army, commanded by General Cardoso and Count Montalegre, was reinforced and re-crossed the Douro some distance east of Porto. When this was known Dom Pedro sent Colonel Hodges with his British battalion on the 17th to reconnoitre the enemy's movements. Learning that they had occupied Penafiel with a strong force, he was reinforced by a volunteer regiment with orders to drive the Miguelites from Penafiel. Between the 19th and 21st this was accomplished, and the force then returned to Porto, but the Miguelites, who had been concentrating their full strength at Amarante, followed them. Before daybreak on the 22nd the bulk of Dom Pedro's army marched out from Porto along the Valongo road to give battle. The army was something of a multinational force, consisting of exiled opponents of Miguel's regime who had rallied to Pedro in the Azores (one battalion consisted entirely of officers), Portuguese volunteers loyal to the Queen, two British contingents commanded by Colonels Shaw and Hodges, and a French contingent commanded by Major Checar. Overall command was exercised by the Count of Vila Flor, with Colonels Brito and Schwalbach leading the Portuguese infantry and some artillery in the charge of Colonel Fonseca.

== Battle ==
=== 22 July ===
Daybreak on 22 July found the Dom Pedro army on the heights of Valongo confronting the Miguelite army which was in a strong position before the village of Ponte Ferreira. Although greatly outnumbered the Dom Pedro light troops attacked with artillery support, but were repulsed and fell back, some guns being lost. They retreated towards Rio Tinto, where Vila Flor had decided to concentrate his forces in order to make an all-out attack the following day. The Miguelite army advanced, following the retreating Dom Pedro forces, and then prepared a defensive position behind the River Sousa, their left protected by the high ground on the right bank of the Douro and their right by a sugar-loaf hill where they placed artillery and a considerable force. Overall they outnumbered Pedro's army, which bivouacked for the night, by at least two to one.

=== 23 July ===
At 3 a.m. the Dom Pedro forces moved out of camp, with the light division under Schwalbach in the centre, Brito's division on the right, and the officers' division, the artillery, the 3rd battalion of the Portuguese 18th Regiment and the French and the British contingents on the left, under Hodges. Dom Pedro himself remained some distance in the rear with a reserve. Hodges' forces were ordered to turn the Miguelite right, and succeeded - the sugar-loaf hill was abandoned and the Portuguese battalion was able to ascend it unopposed. However the French contingent was caught in the plain by the Miguelite cavalry and suffered heavy casualties, Major Checar being killed. The cavalry then attempted to charge the British, who had taken position behind a wall, but were driven back. Meanwhile, Brito's division had been ordered to take the Miguelite left, but despite repeated orders did not advance. The Miguelites, supported by guerrillas, re-took the hill, and Hodges requested reinforcements from Vila Flor, but these were held back by Dom Pedro for a considerable time. Nevertheless, when they came up they regained the hill from the Miguelites in a bayonet charge while Hodges attacked the enemy line from the left. Having suffered heavy casualties the Miguelites withdrew, leaving the field to Pedro's army. Vila Flor wished to follow up the victory and pursue the enemy, but Pedro countermanded this and the army returned to Porto on the afternoon of the 24th.

== Aftermath ==
While the battle was in progress a second Miguelite army under General Póvoas had approached the Douro from the south and taken possession of Vila Nova de Gaia directly across the river from Porto. This caused panic among the population, which the governor Mascarenhas could do nothing to prevent, and was increased by a false report that Dom Pedro's treasure and baggage was being loaded on a ship, showing he was abandoning the city. Also the night after the army's return the sleeping quarters of one of the regiments was destroyed by fire, blamed on arson by Capuchin monks. Dom Pedro's hope that a military victory would suffice to rally Portugal to his cause was now proved illusory, and it was decided to fortify Porto, which was soon under siege from both sides of the river.

Several of Dom Pedro's officers and ministers now began to intrigue for the removal of Vila Flor, and he therefore tendered his resignation; but Dom Pedro refused to accept it, confirmed him as general in chief, and at his request dismissed instead his chief of staff and his quartermaster-general, who were replaced in both roles by Brigadier Valdez as Adjutant-General. Mascarenhas was replaced as Governor of Porto by Bernardo de Sá Nogueira.

== Notes ==
Principal source for this entry is Admiral Charles Napier's narrative of the battle, its antecedents and aftermath in his An Account of the War in Portugal between Don Pedro and Don Miguel (London: T & W Boone, 1836), pp. 36–52. Much of this passage is marked as reproducing "Hodges' Narrative".
