= Siege of Porto =

Siege of Porto, Portugal (1832–1833)

- Part of the Liberal Wars
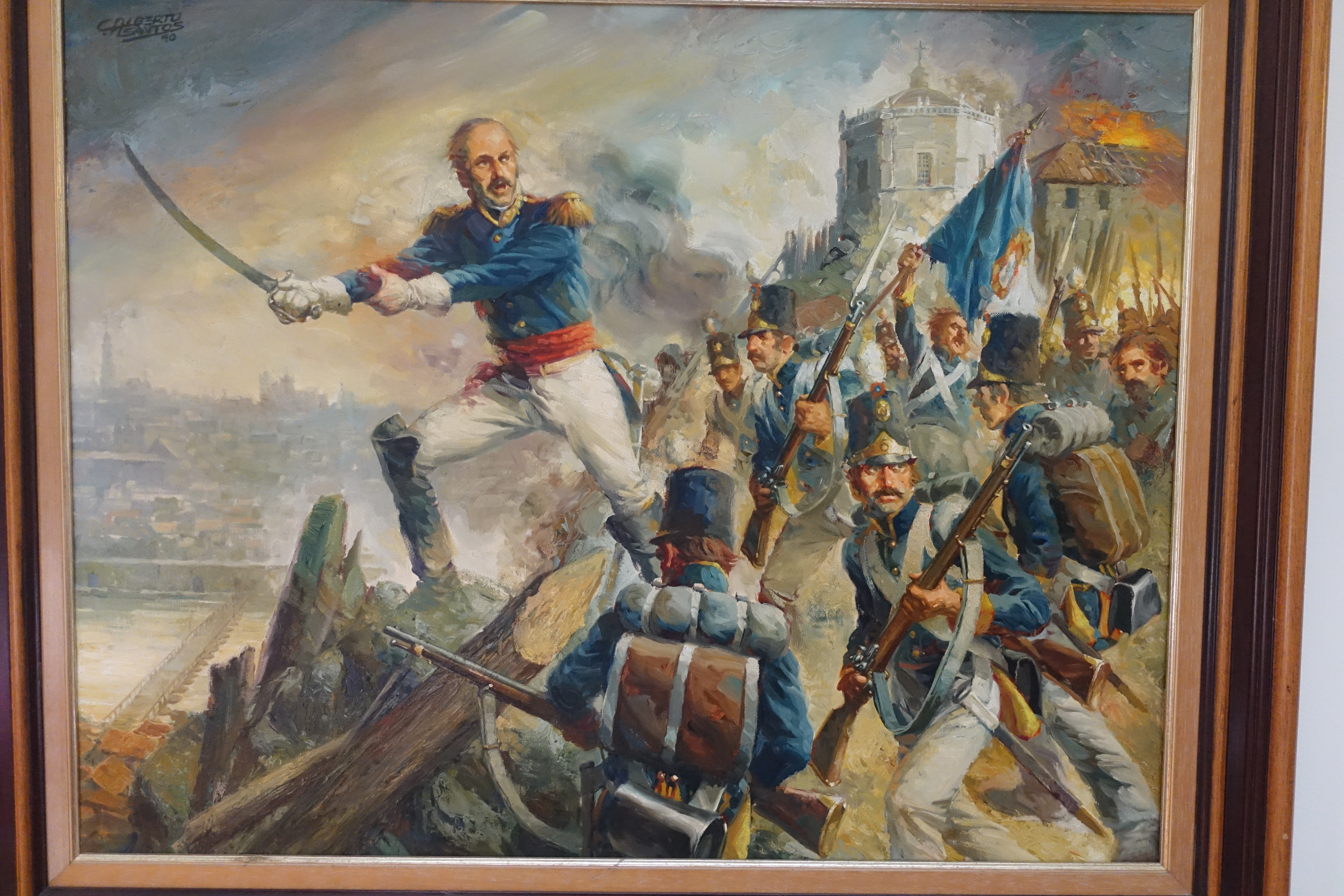
- Painting by Carlos Alberto Santos
Date	July 1832 to August 1833
Location	Porto, Portugal
Result	Liberal victory

Belligerents
Liberals	Miguelists (Royalists)

Commanders and leaders
Dom Pedro; Duke of Terceira; Marshal Saldanha; George Sartorius	Dom Miguel; Viscount of Montalegre; Viscount of Santa Marta; General Póvoas; Marshal of Bourmont; Gaspar Teixeira

Strength
12,000	60,000

Casualties and losses
n/d	n/d

The siege of Porto is considered the period between July 1832 and August 1833 in which the troops of Dom Pedro remained besieged by the forces of Dom Miguel I of Portugal.

The resistance of the city of Porto and the troops of Dom Pedro made the victory of the liberal cause in the Kingdom of Portugal possible. Those that fought in the Siege of Porto on the Liberal side include Almeida Garrett, Alexandre Herculano and Joaquim António de Aguiar.

== Occupation of Porto and first encounters ==
On 9 July 1832, the Liberal army entered Porto on the day after the landing at Mindelo, finding that Miguelite forces had withdrawn from the city rather than defend it in place. Contemporary accounts indicate that the occupation of Porto was an immediate operational success, but it did not bring about the wider collapse of Miguelite resistance that Pedro's supporters had anticipated.

In the days that followed, the Liberals moved to secure the Douro estuary and the southern bank opposite the city. Under the protection of Admiral George Rose Sartorius's squadron, Liberal troops crossed to Vila Nova de Gaia and occupied the Serra do Pilar, thereby strengthening control of the river crossing and improving communications with the fleet. These measures consolidated the occupation of Porto, but they did not remove the Miguelite forces from the surrounding district.

Liberal detachments then advanced eastward toward Penafiel and Valongo in an attempt to observe and disrupt Miguelite concentrations beyond Porto. These operations led to the fighting at Ponte Ferreira on 22–23 July 1832, the first major field engagement of the campaign after the capture of the city. Although Pedro's forces retained Porto, the action did not produce a decisive result, and the Miguelite army remained intact and capable of resuming operations against the Liberal position. As Miguelite forces regrouped around the city and on the southern bank of the Douro, Pedro and his commanders were compelled to organise Porto for sustained defence. The occupation of the city therefore became the opening phase of the Siege of Porto.

== The Siege ==
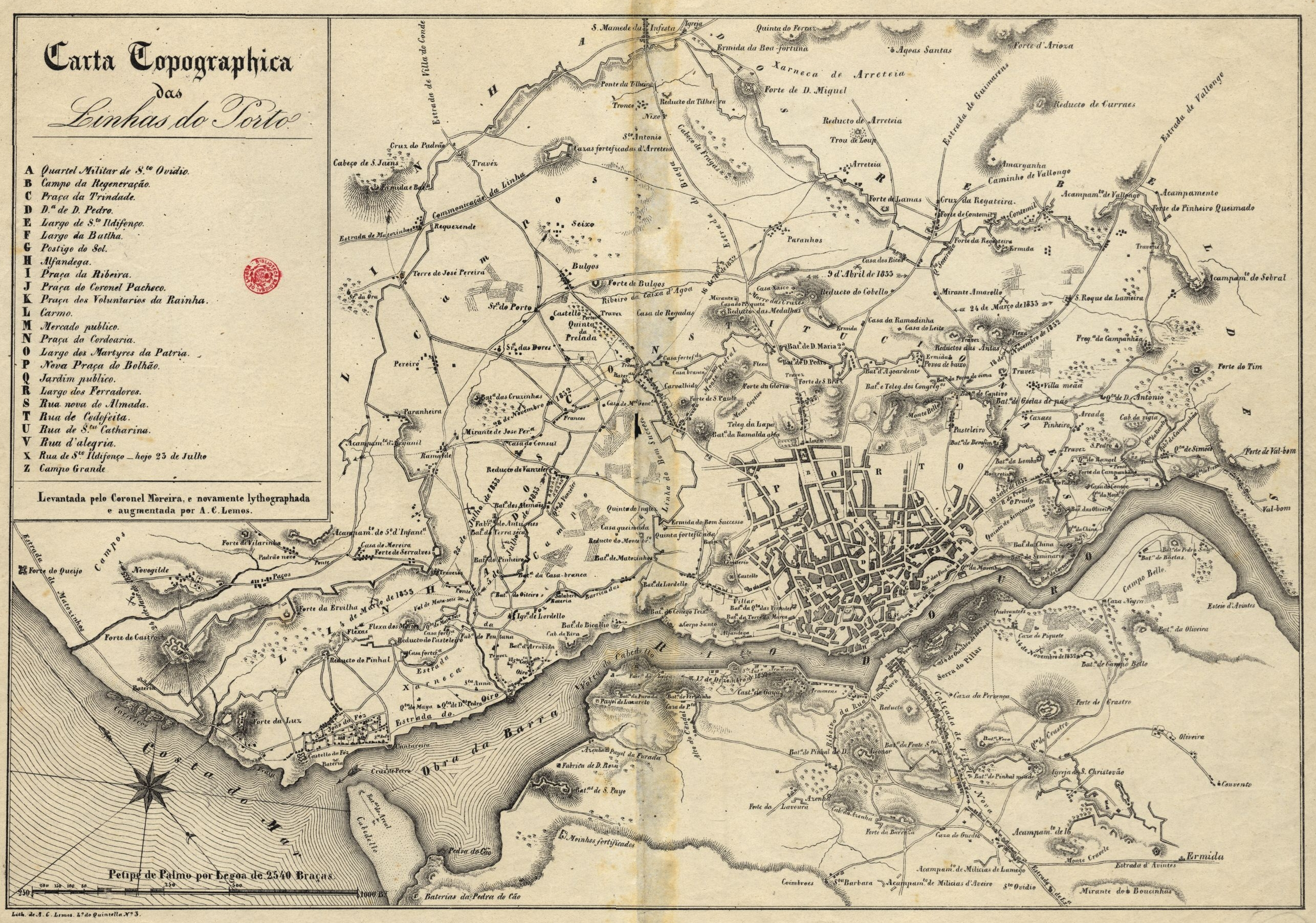
Topographic map of the Siege of Porto

After Ponte Ferreira, the Miguelite forces of General Póvoas and the Viscount of Santa Marta were brought together around Porto, placing increasing pressure on the Liberal position in and around the city. Meanwhile, the position at the Serra do Pilar assumed growing importance in the defence of the Liberal bridgehead south of the Douro. As the Miguelite army tightened its hold on the approaches to Porto, Pedro was forced to abandon the expectation of an immediate advance through northern Portugal and instead reorganise his forces for the defence of the city and its communications with the fleet.

The besiegers were supported by an organised system of batteries, forts and redoubts on both banks of the Douro, forming a continuous perimeter around the Liberal position in Porto and Vila Nova de Gaia. A British topographical map prepared in July 1833 depicts batteries, roads and encampments on both banks of the Douro around Porto and Gaia, while accounts of the siege describe these works as an entrenched artillery perimeter that enabled sustained bombardment of the city. One notable long-range piece was a Paixhans gun placed on the heights of the Candal in Gaia, opposite the Liberal positions at the Serra do Pilar.

The siege effectively ended in August 1833, after the Liberal expedition to the south culminated in the occupation of Lisbon and altered the strategic balance of the war. Following the failure of the Miguelite assaults of 5 July and 25 July 1833, the besiegers were progressively forced back, and on 18 August Saldanha won a further victory that compelled Miguelite forces to raise the siege and withdraw from their remaining positions around Porto. By 20 August 1833, the city had been effectively relieved.
