= Liberal Wars =

Civil war in the Kingdom of Portugal (1828–1834)

Portuguese Civil War
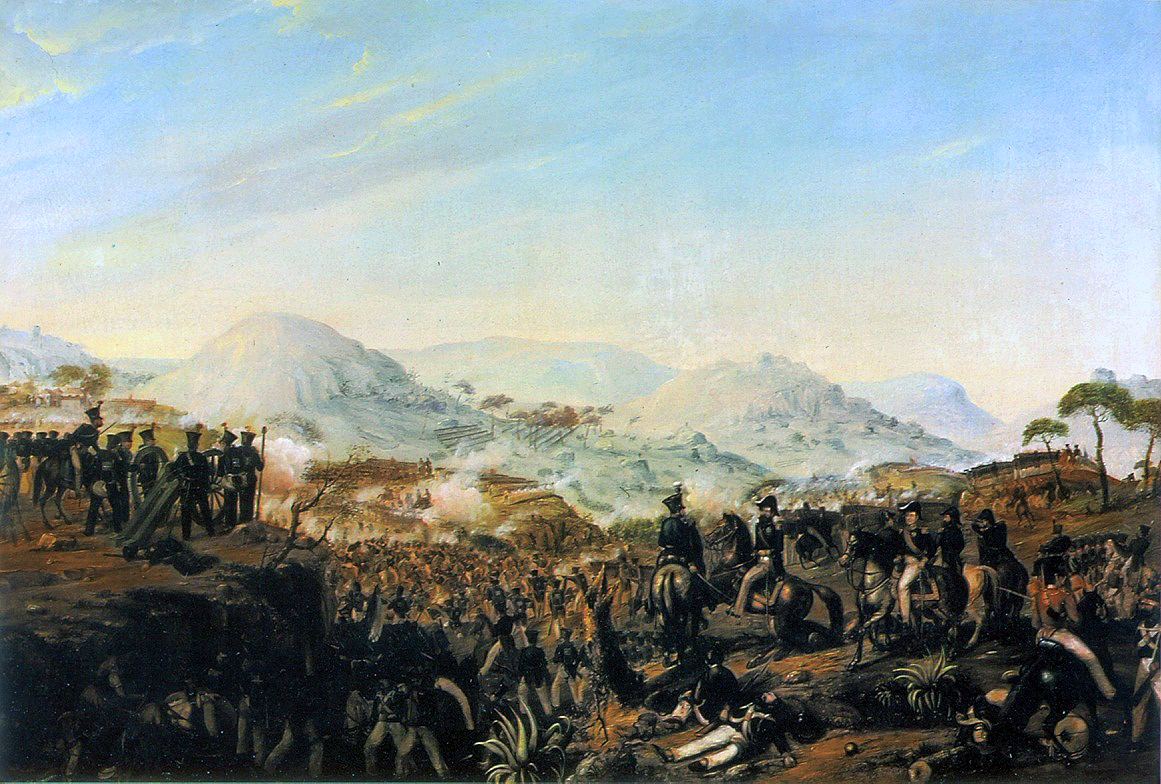
- Battle of Ferreira Bridge, 23 July 1832
Date	18 May 1828 – 16 May 1834 (5 years, 11 months and 4 weeks)
Location	Portugal
Result	Liberal victory: Concession of Evoramonte

Belligerents
Liberals Supported by: Spain (1833–1834); United Kingdom; France (1832–1834); Belgian volunteers (1832–1834)	Miguelites Supported by: Spain (1832–1833); Russian Empire; (Papal States) Catholic Church

Commanders and leaders
Pedro IV; Maria II; Duke of Terceira; Marshal Saldanha; Charles Napier	Miguel I (surrendered); Luís Guedes; Manuel de Sousa; Duke of Cadaval; Álvaro Póvoas; Remexido (executed)

The Liberal Wars (Portuguese: Guerras Liberais), also known as the Portuguese Civil War (Guerra Civil Portuguesa) and the War of the Two Brothers (Guerra dos Dois Irmãos) was a civil war in Portugal that lasted from May 1828 to May 1834, fought between liberal progressive constitutionalists (led by former King Pedro IV) and conservative traditionalists (led by King Miguel I) over the country's system of government and royal succession. Embroiled parties included the Kingdom of Portugal, Portuguese rebels, the United Kingdom, France, the Catholic Church, Spain and Russia.

== Roots of the conflict ==
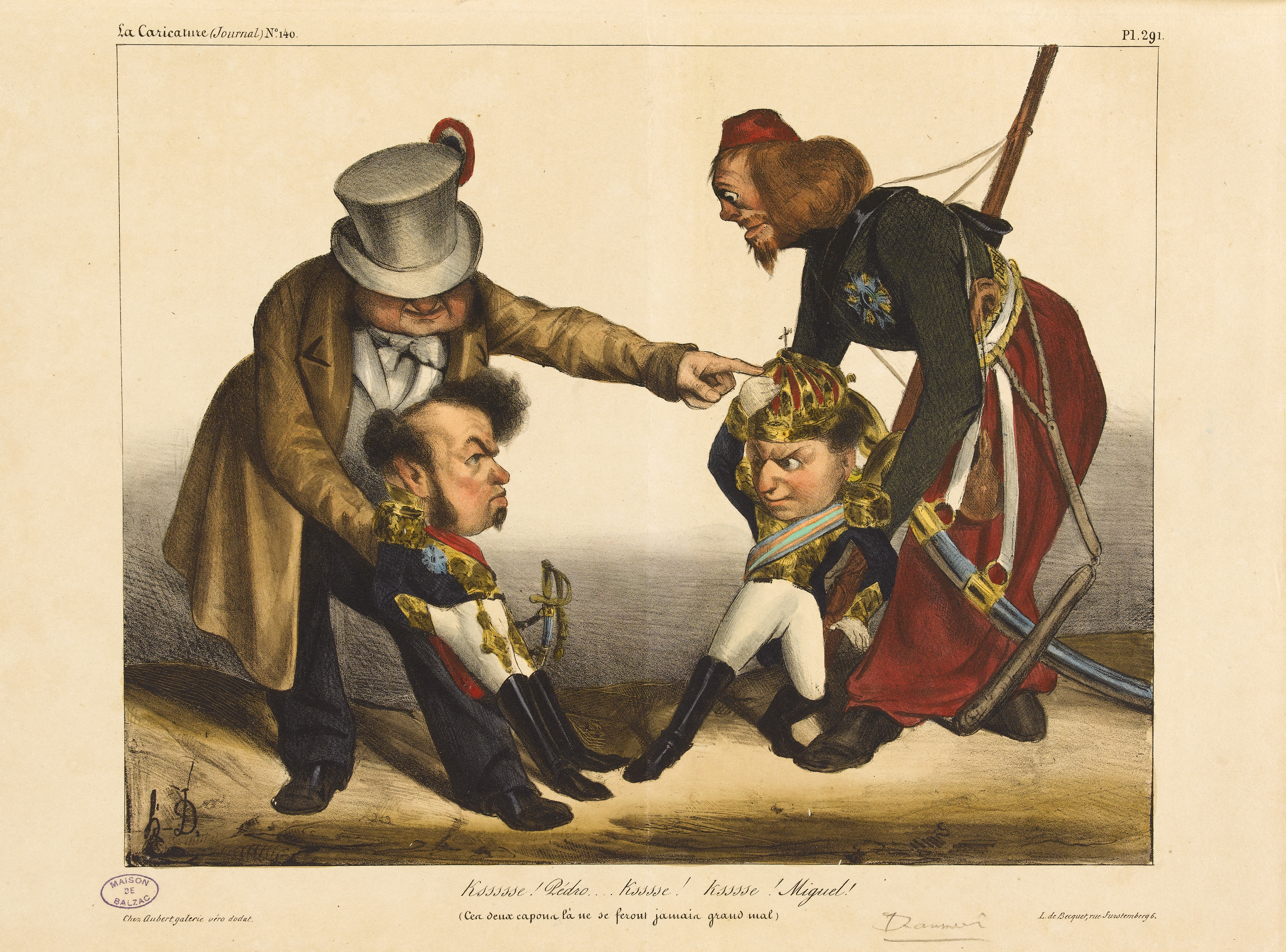
A contemporaneous cartoon, showing the conflict between the Two Brothers, as children, supported and instigated, respectively, by the French King Louis Philippe I, representing the liberal side, and Czar Nicholas I of Russia, representing the anti-liberalist Holy Alliance

The death of King John VI in 1826 created a dispute over royal succession. While Dom Pedro, the Emperor of Brazil, was the king's oldest son, his younger brother Miguel contended that Pedro had forfeited his claim to the throne by declaring Brazilian independence and by declaring war on the Kingdom of Portugal, therefore violating the succession rules mentioned in the Fundamental Laws of the Kingdom. Pedro briefly entitled himself King Pedro IV of Portugal. Neither the Portuguese nor the Brazilians wanted a unified monarchy; consequently, in 1826 Pedro revised the first constitution of Portugal granted in 1822 and abdicated the throne in favor of his daughter, Maria, a child of 7, while establishing his sister Isabel Maria as regent.

== A new constitution ==
In the Portuguese Constitutional Charter, Pedro attempted to reconcile traditionalists and liberals by allowing both factions a role in the government. Unlike the Constitution of 1822, this new document established four branches of government. The Legislature was divided into two chambers. The upper chamber, the Chamber of Peers, was composed of life and hereditary peers and clergy appointed by the king. The lower chamber, the Chamber of Deputies, was composed of 111 deputies elected to four-year terms by the indirect vote of local assemblies, which in turn were elected by a limited suffrage of male tax-paying property owners. Judicial power was exercised by the courts; executive power by the ministers of the government; and moderative power by the king, who held an absolute veto over all legislation.

== Discontent ==
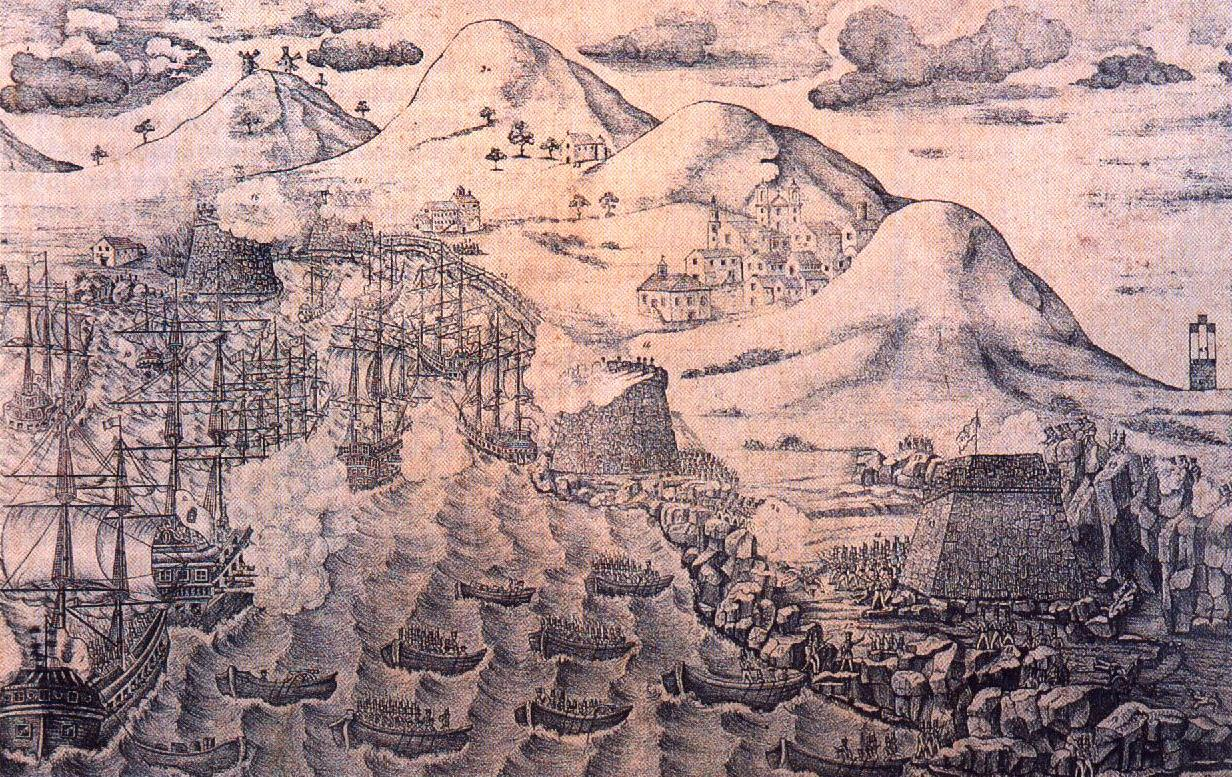
Battle of Praia Bay, 11 August 1829

The traditionalist party of the landowners and the Church, however, were not satisfied with this compromise, and they continued to regard Miguel as the legitimate successor to the throne on the grounds that according to the Portuguese succession rules (approved by the Cortes after the 1640 Restoration), Pedro had lost the right to the Portuguese crown, and therefore to choose a successor, when he took possession of a foreign crown (Brazil). They were alarmed by the liberal reforms that had been initiated in Spain by the detested Revolutionary French (reforms from which the Portuguese feudal aristocracy had been spared) and took heart at the recent restoration of the autocratic Ferdinand VII in Spain (1823) who was eradicating all the Napoleonic innovations. In February 1828, Miguel returned to Portugal, ostensibly to take the oath of allegiance to the Charter and assume the regency. He was immediately proclaimed king by his supporters, who pressed him to return to absolutism. A month after his return, Miguel dissolved the Chamber of Deputies and the Chamber of Peers and, in May, summoned the traditional Cortes of the three estates of the realm to proclaim his accession to absolute power. The Cortes of 1828 assented to Miguel's wish, proclaiming him king as Miguel I of Portugal and nullifying the Constitutional Charter.

== Rebellion ==
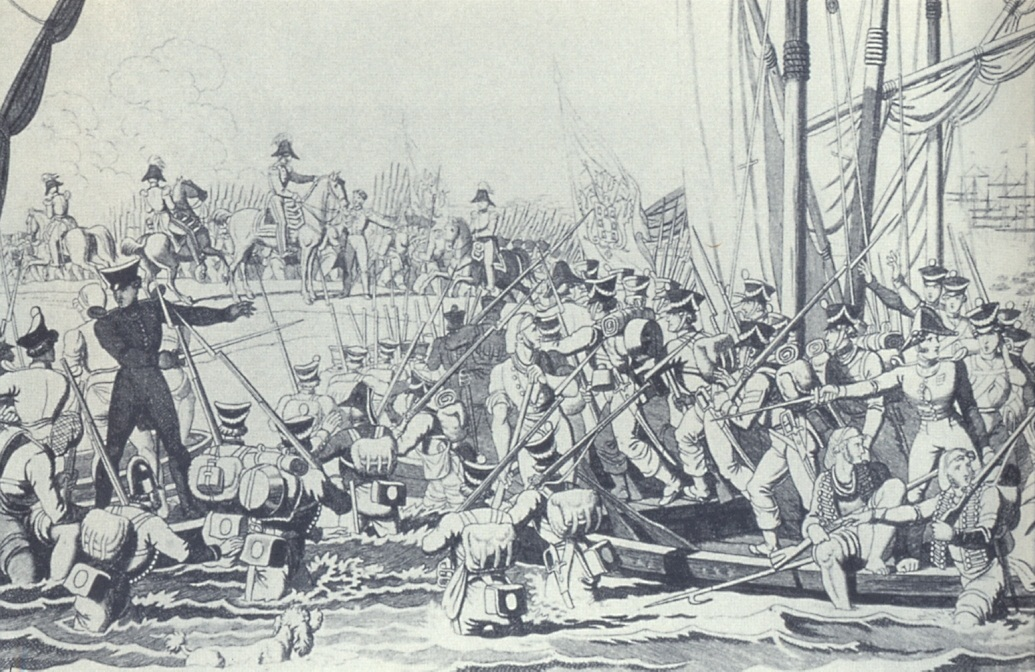
Landing of the liberal forces in Pampelido, north of Porto, 8 July 1832

Battle of Cape St. Vincent, 5 July 1833

This alleged usurpation did not go unchallenged by the Liberals. On May 18, the garrison in Porto, the center of Portuguese progressives, declared its loyalty to Pedro IV and his daughter Maria II, and the Constitutional Charter. The rebellion against the absolutists spread to other cities. Miguel suppressed these rebellions, and many thousands of Liberals were either arrested or fled to Spain and Britain. There followed five years of repression.

Meanwhile, in Brazil, relations between Pedro and Brazil's agricultural magnates had become strained. In April 1831, Pedro abdicated in Brazil in favor of his son, Pedro II, and sailed for Britain. He organized a military expedition there and then went to Terceira island in the Azores, which was in the hands of the Liberals, to set up a government in exile. The government of Miguel blockaded the island, but the blockading squadron was attacked by a French squadron during the run-up to the Battle of the Tagus, where several Miguelist ships were captured. (Half of the liberal army consisted of French, British, Spanish and Belgian soldiers).

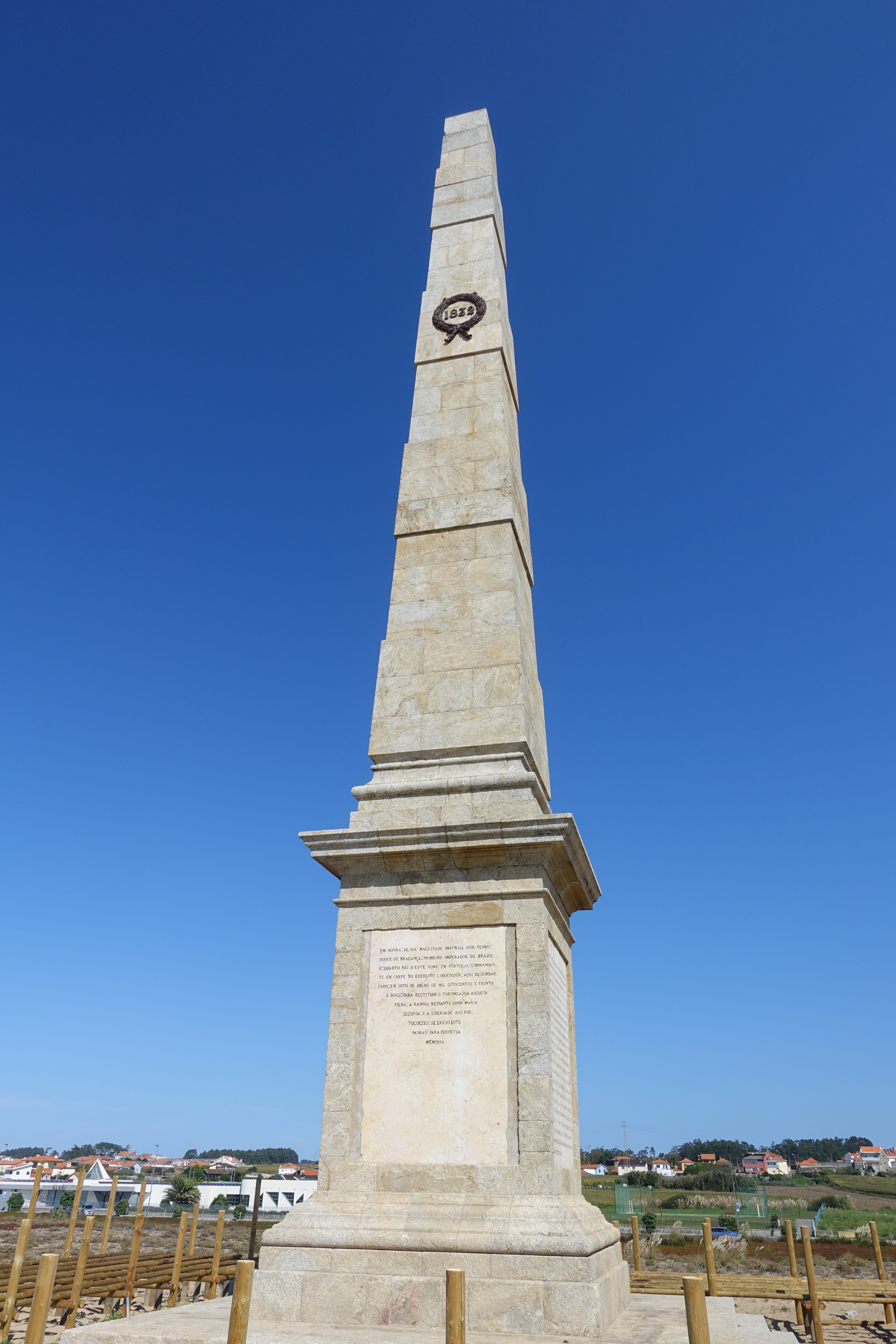
Monument north of Porto, to the landing of the liberal forces under the command of the British admiral George Sartorius on 8 July 1832.

In July 1832, with the backing of Liberals in Spain and Britain, an expedition led by Pedro landed near Porto, in the Landing at Mindelo, which the Miguelites abandoned and where, after military activities including the Battle of Ponte Ferreira, Pedro and his associates were besieged by Miguelite forces for nearly a year. To protect British interests, a naval squadron under Commander William Nugent Glascock in HMS Orestes was stationed in the Douro, where it came under fire from both sides. In June 1833, the Liberals, still encircled at Porto, sent to the Algarve a force commanded by the Duke of Terceira supported by a naval squadron commanded by Charles Napier, using the alias 'Carlos de Ponza'. The Duke of Terceira landed at Faro and marched north through the Alentejo to capture Lisbon on July 24. Meanwhile, Napier's squadron encountered the absolutists' fleet near Cape Saint Vincent (Cabo São Vicente) and decisively defeated it at the fourth Battle of Cape St. Vincent. The Liberals were able to occupy Lisbon, where Pedro moved from Porto and repulsed a Miguelite siege. A stalemate of nine months ensued. Following the death of Ferdinand VII Spain changed sides and started to support the liberals. Towards the end of 1833, Maria da Glória was proclaimed queen, and Pedro was made regent. His first act was to confiscate the property of all who had served under King Miguel. He also suppressed all religious houses and confiscated their property, an act that suspended friendly relations with Rome for nearly eight years, until mid-1841. The absolutists controlled the rural areas, where they were supported by the aristocracy, and by a peasantry that was galvanized by the Church.

Engraving of Remexido, from ca. 1836, the nickname of José Joaquim de Sousa Reis (Estômbar, 19 October 1796 – Faro, 2 August 1838), a civil servant and wealthy land tenant who became a notorious guerrilla leader of the Algarve in Portugal, defending the rights of King Miguel to the Portuguese throne and the antiliberal absolute monarchy in the Kingdom of Portugal

The Liberals occupied Portugal's major cities, Lisbon and Porto, where they commanded a sizable following among the middle classes. Operations against the Miguelites began again in earnest in early 1834, a year marked by the end of Spanish support which had changed sides to the liberals in 1833. Meanwhile, the Liberal army had suffered a sound defeat at Alcácer do Sal, which proved that, despite the Duke of Terceira's recent march from Faro to Lisbon, the south was still loyal to the Miguelites. In the southernmost region of Continental Portugal, the region of Algarve, a man known as Remexido, hidden in the mountainous terrain around São Marcos da Serra, became a legend as a guerrilla loyal to the legitimist, antiliberal Miguelites until well after the end of the Liberal Wars.

== Peace ==
The Battle of Asseiceira, fought on May 16, 1834, was the last and decisive engagement of the Portuguese Civil War. The Miguelist army was still formidable (about 18,000 men), but on May 26, 1834, at Evoramonte, to end the bloodbath in the country after six years of civil war a peace was declared under a concession by which Miguel formally renounced all claims to the throne of Portugal, was guaranteed an annual pension, and was definitively exiled. Pedro restored the Constitutional Charter, but he died September 24, 1834. In truth this was the official peace as Miguellist groups were still in action until the 1840s.

Maria da Glória resumed her interrupted reign as Maria II of Portugal.

== See also ==
- Liberalism in Portugal
- Dissolution of the monasteries in Portugal
- Joaquim António de Aguiar
- Remexido
- First Carlist War
