= Chapel of D. Fradique =

- Capela de D. Fradique
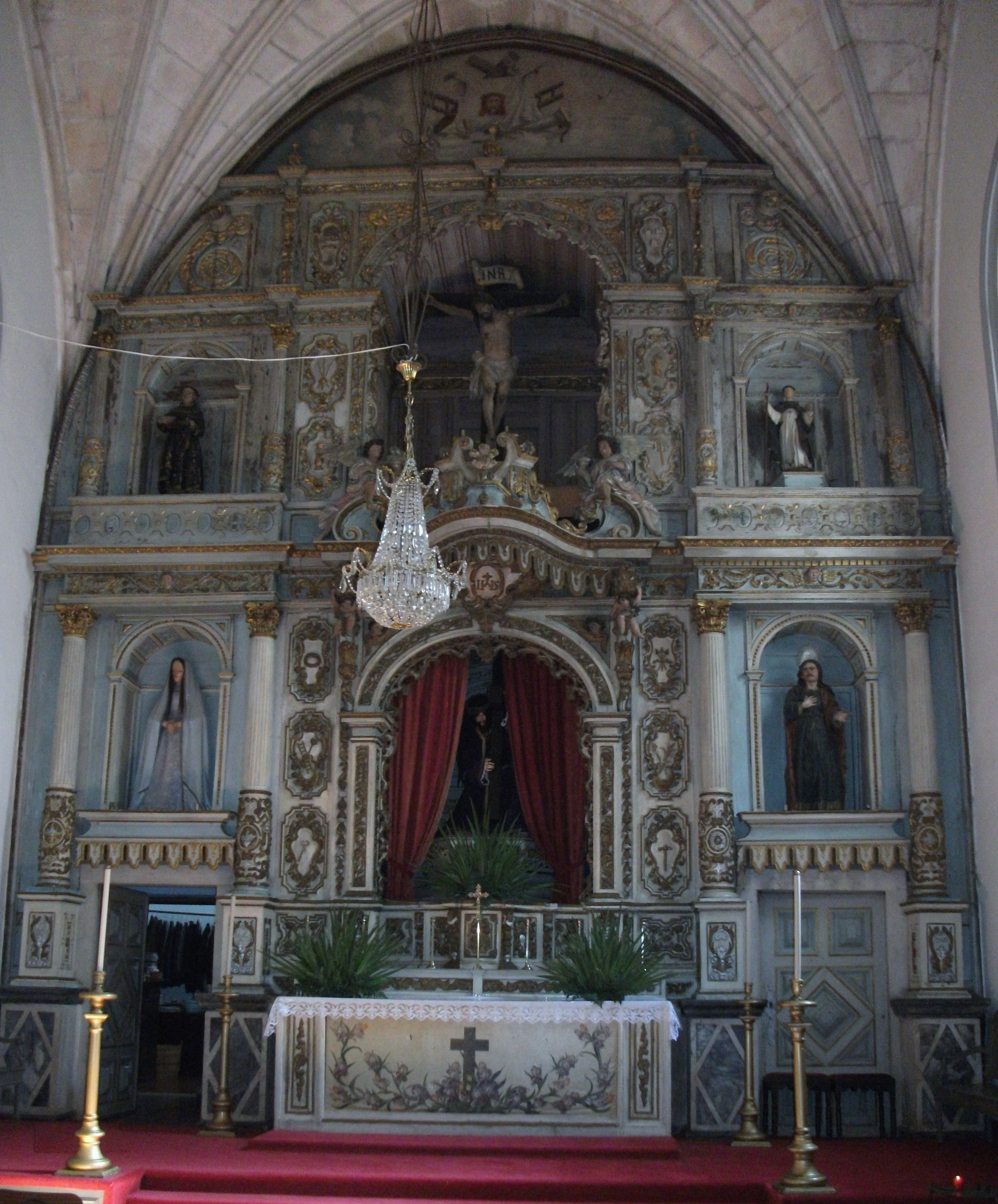
- aEstremoz
- Chapel of D. Fradique
- 38.84359°N 7.58993°W
- Location: Évora, Alentejo Central, Alentejo
- Country: Portugal

Architecture
- Architect(s): Manuel Francisco, Coelho Guimarães, Pedro Guimarães
- Style: Gothic, Renaissance, Baroque

The Chapel of D. Fradique (Portuguese: Capela de D. Fradique) is a chapel located in the Convent of São Francisco, in the civil parish of Estremoz (Santa Maria e Santo André), in the municipality of Estremoz, in the Portuguese district of Évora.

== History ==
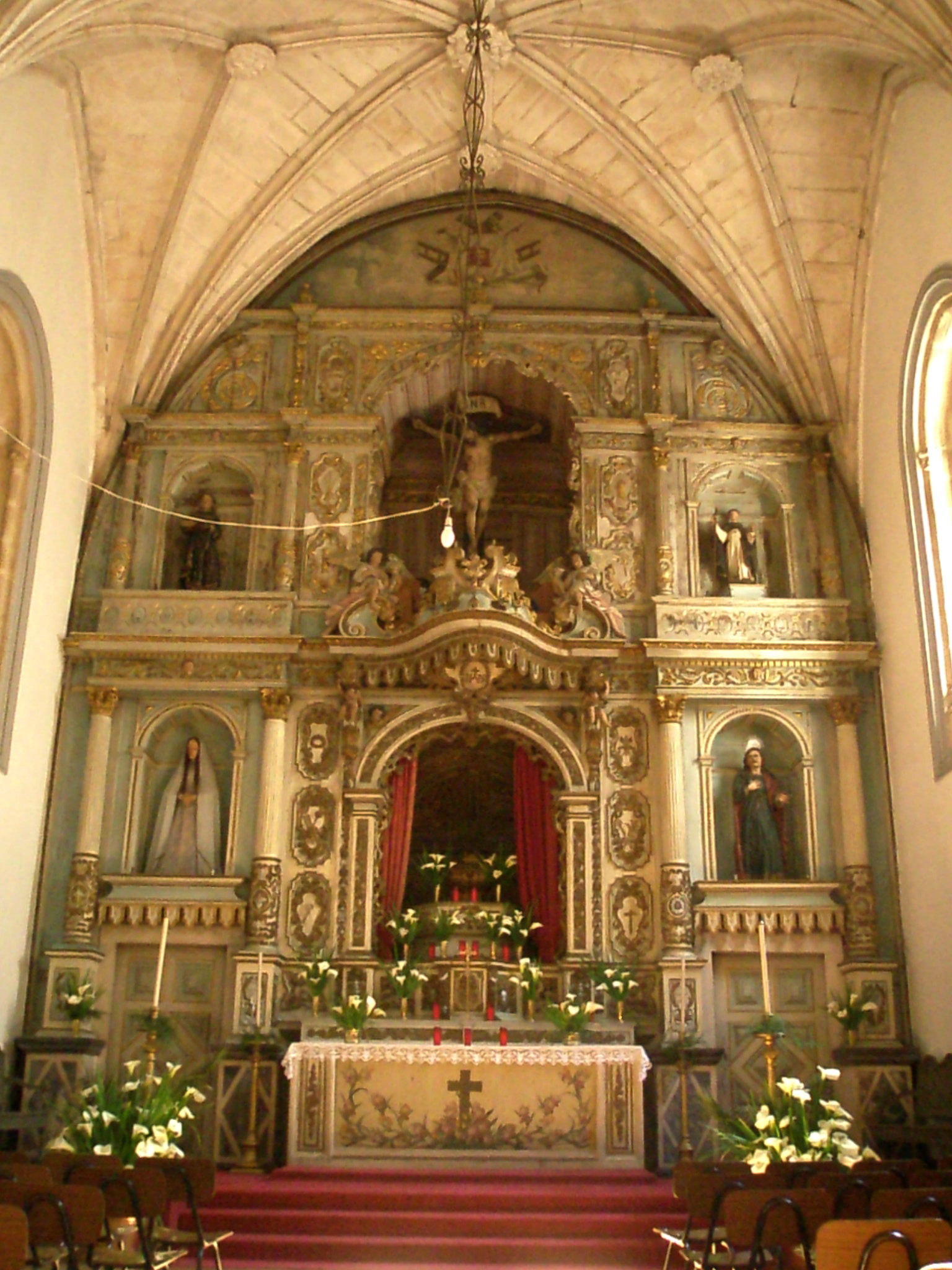
Altar of the Capela de D. Fradique de Portugal.

In 1255 the Royal Convent of Estremoz was founded. The noble Eborense knight, Nuno Martins, first of the cloistered order, who enjoyed royal favour and protection, was buried at the foot of the cross.

D. Fradique was a person of importance in the peninsular politics of the reign of King D. Manuel I. Son of the Counts of Faro, D. Afonso and D. Maria de Noronha, he realized his ecclesiastical career in Castile, where he was educated alongside the Catholic Monarchs. For a time he was the executor of Queen Isabel of Aragon, Bishop of Calahorra, Segóvia, Siguenza and Saragoza. In Saragoza he ascended to the status of Archbishop, and shortly after, he was nominated by King Charles V as Viceroy of Catalonia.

Some time during the 15th century, the chapel of D. Fradique was probably erected, before the region was integrated into the Province of the Algarves (in 1425). This was before the 6 May 1520 papal bull from Leo X that gave license to King Manuel I to construct a convent to the invocation of St. Francis in the village of Estremoz.

An inscription, dated 3 March 1535, was placed over the portico of the chapel of Fradique. In the pavement of the chapel are tombstones marking the members of seigneurial Masters of Vimeiro, including the tombs of Fernando de Noronha (who died in 1552) and Isabel de Melo (1563). The chapel, initially consecrated to the name of St. Francis, shelter after 17th century of the Brotherhood of Senhor Jesus dos Passos. It was this institution that ordered the Mannerist retable that crowned the southern wall, that was damaged by natural causes, and in the 19th century, an era when they opted for imitation marble painting to substitute the original goldleaf.

By order of the reformer, the Archbishop Infante D. Henrique delivered in 1541 the observance of the Province of the Algarves.

The temple was remodelled in 1771.

In 1876, the ceiling of the chapel of D. Fradique was remodelled and repaired.

The first major works carried out by the DGEMN Direcção Geral dos Edifícios e Monumentos Nacionais (General-Directorate for Buildings and National Monuments) began in the middle of the 20th century, with preliminary surveys for the restoration of the chapel of D. Fradique 1963 (that proceeded with the consolidation of the cross and general restoration of the ceiling). Secondary repairs preceded in 1970 and in 1975 in the vaulted ceiling, and in 1980, repairs to the chapel that include cleaning and revision of the ceiling.

=== Architecture ===
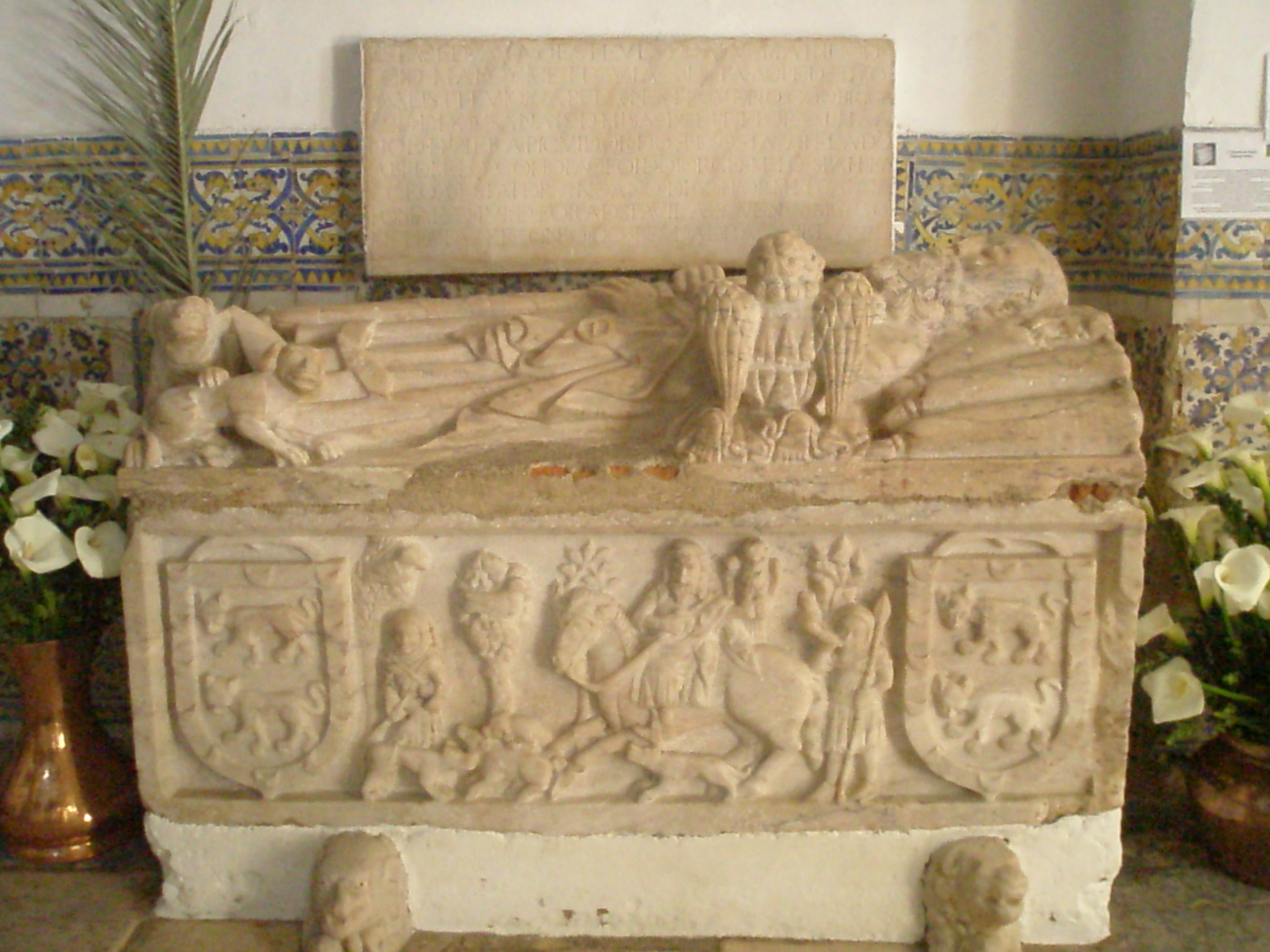
The sarcophagus of Vasco Esteves de Gatus

The small chapel, open to the third line of the southern flank of the church and Convent of São Francisco. A Manueline structure of artistic quality in the city of Estremoz, constructed by and for a figure of importance to European history.

The chapel of D. Fradique consists of a portico of sculptural work within a perfect arch, framed by two archivolts and highly-ornamented vegetal interlacings, on a fine, two-order, hexagonal-shaped colonnades over circular plinths and vegetal capitals. The rod or vegetal trunk, with hexagonal capitals and fluted ornamentation forms a body with inner archivolt (or similar appearance) and shoulder columns.

The two-section ribbed, ogival vault, with marble silhouettes, is loaded over thin triple columns over hexagonal three-order bases with annular rings and capitals of vegetal crochet. Vegetal buttons close the vault, while in the clasp of a Manueline button is the Noronha heraldry. In the columns of the toral arch, on the side of the gospel, is a parchment letter, carried on a angel's head, with the inscription:

ESTA CAPELA MANDOV FAZER / O MVI ILVSTRE E REVERENDISSIMO / SEÑOR DOM FRADIQVE DE POR / TVGAL ARCEBISPO QVE FOI DE / ZARAGOÇA E VISV REI DE CATA / LVNHA A QVAL HE DO ILVSTRE SE / HOR DOM FRÃCISCO DE FARO SEV / SOBRINHO E HERDEIRO SEÑOR DA / VILA DO VIMEIRO //. TÚMULO DE ESTEVES DA GATA
This Chapel ordered made / the Most Illustrious e Revered / Sir Dom Fradique of Por / tugal Archbishop that was from / Zargoza and King of Cata / lonia who is the Illustrious Sir / Dom Francisco of Faro sev / Nephew and Descendent Sir of / Vila of Vimeiro // Tomb of Esteves da Gata

The squat-shaped parallelepiped tombstone, rests on two aggressive lions, forming a lateral retable.

The mounted rider, preceded by a batter, displays the hawk in his left hand and brings a spearman to the stirrup. Around three agitated lebrus and in the background, among the vegetation, a bird of prey. To the sides are two coats of arms, equal and symmetrical, bring by field two cats and in the border eight crescents; On the cap lies the knight, with large beards in caneletes, his head raised by three cushions, holding the sword between his two hands, with a large pleated robe, assisted by a prayerful angel, in a long robe and kneeling, and guarded by two lebrus.

The marble sarcophagus is the inscription in Roman characters:

ESTA S(EPULTUR)A E DE VASCO ESTEVES DE GATUS MARIDO Q(UE)/ FOI DE MARG(ARID)A VIC(ENT)E QVIA S(EPULTUR)A ESTA AO PE DESTA O/ QVAL INSTITVIV CAPELA NESTE CO(N)VENTO CO(M) OBRIGA/ ÇÃO D(E) DOVS ANAIS DE MISSAS P(ER)A SE(M)PRE POR S ALMA. A/ NO DE 1401 ERA PIÇVIDOR DOS BE(N)S D(E) ESTA CAPELA DO(M)/ ANT(ONI)O DE MELO COMO IA O FOI DO(M) IORGE D(E) MELO S(EV) PAI P(ER) LA/ COROA. ESTA PEDRA POS NO ANO D(E) 1624 POR M(AN)DO D(E) P(EDRO) GARCIA / PONALVO IVIS DE FORA DESTA VILA AQVEM S(VA) M(AGESTA)DE CO/ METEO FAZER TOMBO DOS BE(N)S DA DITA CAPELA.
This tombstone is of Vasco Esteves de Gatus married who / was of Margarida Vicente who tomb is at the foot of this / who instituted the chapel in this convent with obligation / of two years of masses for ever for his soul. Year of 1401 was provider of the possessions of this chapel Dom / António de Melo like Dom Jorge de Melo his father for the / Crown. This stone was placed in 1624 by order of Pedro Garcia / Ponaluo iuis outside this town to whom his majesty committed / make the tomb of goods of the chapel.

The sarcophagus has been dated to 1363, a disparity of 38 years, from the original tombstone age; a precipitous interpretation of the tombstone reading led scholars to attribute the sarcophagus incorrectly.
