= Pedro Afonso, Count of Barcelos =

Pedro Afonso
- Count of Barcelos
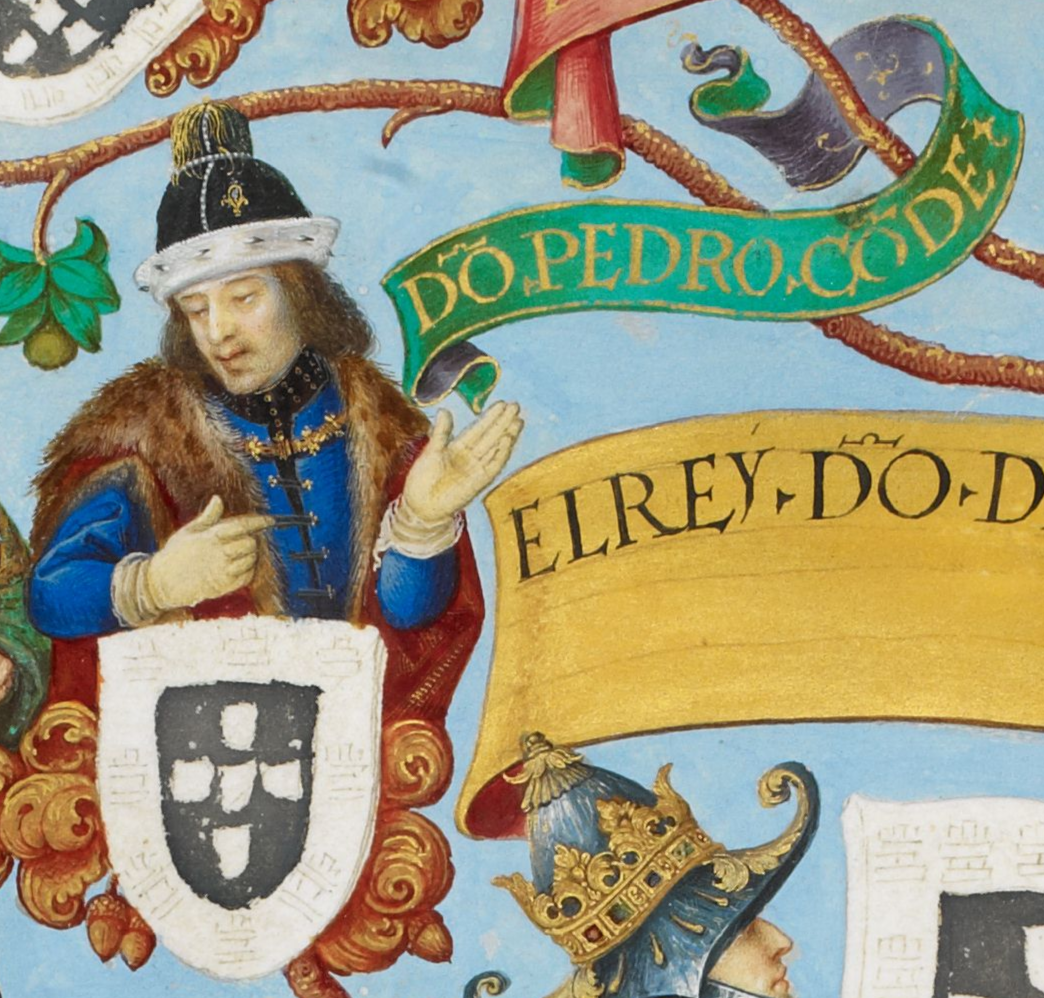
- Pedro Afonso, Count of Barcelos, in Antonio de Hollanda's Genealogy of the Royal Houses of Spain and Portugal (1530–1534)
- Born: before 1289
- Died: 1354
- House: Portuguese House of Burgundy
- Father: Denis of Portugal
- Mother: Grácia Froes

Pedro Afonso, Count of Barcelos (before 1289 – 1354), was an illegitimate son of King Denis of Portugal and Grácia Froes. He was made the 3rd Count of Barcelos on 1 May 1314.

== Biography ==
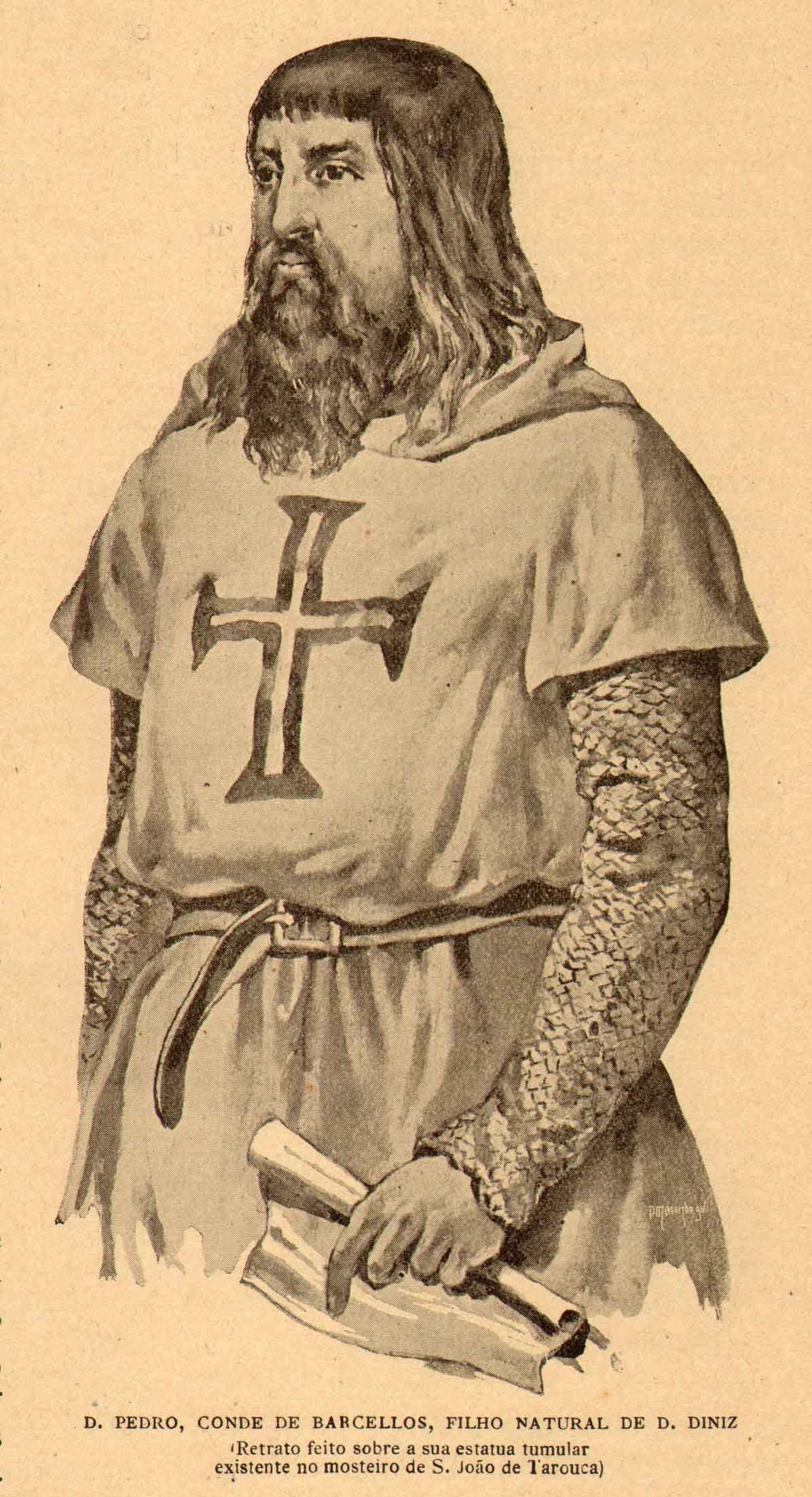
Dom Pedro Afonso, 3rd Count of Barcelos

Much like the other illegitimate children of King Denis, Pedro Afonso was raised by Queen Elizabeth of Portugal along with his half-brothers and half-sisters at court. The children were sent at an early age to live there as a political, not charitable necessity, as they were seen as a method of cementing alliances and creating a network of influence within the courts of Europe. King Denis in his October 1298 will stated that the Queen would specifically administer and instruct his illegitimate children, and provided that they would be disinherited if they were to dishonour or disobey the authority of Infante Afonso.

The Count always counted on the protection and support of his father, receiving dominion over lands in Lisbon, Estremoz, Evoramonte, Sintra and Tavira, among others. He soon became an important manager, from 1306, of the inheritances that the king bestowed.

In 1307, he became the steward to Beatrice of Castile.

With the conflicts that developed between Denis and the crown prince Afonso, the King invested his illegitimate son with the title of Count of Barcelos (in 1317), at the time, a non-hereditary title in the kingdom. Pedro Afonso remained on the King's side during the initial phases of the civil war, between 1319 and 1324. At the same time he continued to stay close to the Crown Prince. After disagreements with his brothers João Afonso and Afonso Sanchez, principal opponents of Afonso, he was seen as doing a disservice to the King and exiled to Castile, where he remained between 1317 and 1322.

On returning from exile in 1322, he looked to reconcile with his father, in order to recuperate his lost titles and properties. At the same time, he attempted to fill the role of conciliator between Denis and the Infante Afonso, alongside his stepmother, Queen Elizabeth.

After the death of Denis in 1325, and the accession to the throne of the Infante Afonso as Afonso IV of Portugal, Count Pedro Afonso began to occupy his time in the civil parish of Lalim, near Lamego, limiting himself to interventions with his brother Afonso against the Crown of Castile. In this role he was seen as "the strong arm, and strong blow, that drowned the resistance in their own blood".

Afonso named him royal representative to the peace agreement between the kingdoms of Castile and Portugal, but illness prevented him from accompanying Archbishop Gonçalo Pereira to the meeting.

Francisco Brandão indicated that Pedro Afonso was recognized at Court (in Portugal, Castile and Aragon) as a man of "great opinion, discreet, valorous, and generally applauded by those of important rank in Spain".

He died in 1354 at his home in the Paço de Lalim, and was buried in the Monastery of Tarouca.

== Works ==
Following his "retirement" to the civil parish of Lalim, Pedro Afonso was credited with a group of literary works on various themes, including the Crônica Geral de Espanha (1344) and the Livro de Linhagens, in addition to the Livro das Cantigas. Two additional works of genealogy, currently held at the Torre do Tombo National Archives in Lisbon, are also attributed to him: Nobreza de Portugal e linhagens dos reinos de Portugal e Castela and Nobiliário de Espanha.

== Marriages ==
Count Pedro was married first to Branca Peres de Sousa, the daughter of wealthy and powerful courtiers, Pedro Eanes de Portel and Constança Mendes de Sousa, and had one child who died in infancy. In his five-volume work, the Monarquia Lusitania, Friar Francisco Brandão reported that the child was buried in Santa Maria dos Olivares, in Tomar, where the church records refer to the burial of "a nephew of King Denis".

Queen Elizabeth, ever involved in marriage alliances, arranged his second marriage, around 1300, with Maria Ximénez Cornel (who was later buried in the Monastery of Santa Maria de Sigena), one of the Queen's Aragonese ladies-in-waiting, and the daughter of a powerful Aragonese nobleman, Pedro Cornel.

After his separation from Maria Ximénez, the Count started a relationship with Teresa Anes de Toledo, a lady-in-waiting to the Queen Consort of Portugal Beatrice of Castile, wife of King Afonso IV.

== Sources ==
- Mocelim, Adriana (2007). Por meter amor e amizade entre os nobres fidalgos da Espanha : o livro de linhagens do Conde Pedro Afonso no contexto tardo – medieval português (PDF) (in Portuguese). Curitiba, Brazil: Federal University of Paraná. Archived from the original (PDF) on 3 March 2016.
- Gimenez, José Carlos (2005). O papel político da Rainha Isabel de Portugal na Península Ibérica: 1280–1336 (PDF) (in Portuguese). Federal University of Paraná.
- Jesús, Rafael de (1985). [1683] Monarquia Lusitana: Parte Sétima (in Portuguese). Lisbon, Portugal: Imprensa Nacional/Casa da Moeda. OCLC 490950946.
- Brandão, Francisco (1976). [1650] Monarquia Lusitana: Parte Quinta. Lisbon, Portugal: Imprensa Nacional/Casa da Moeda. OCLC 490954377.
