= Igreja de São Francisco =

Igreja de São Francisco may refer to:

- Igreja de São Francisco (Estremoz)
- Igreja de São Francisco (Évora)
- Igreja de São Francisco (Porto)
