= Convent of São Francisco (Estremoz) =

- Convento de São Francisco
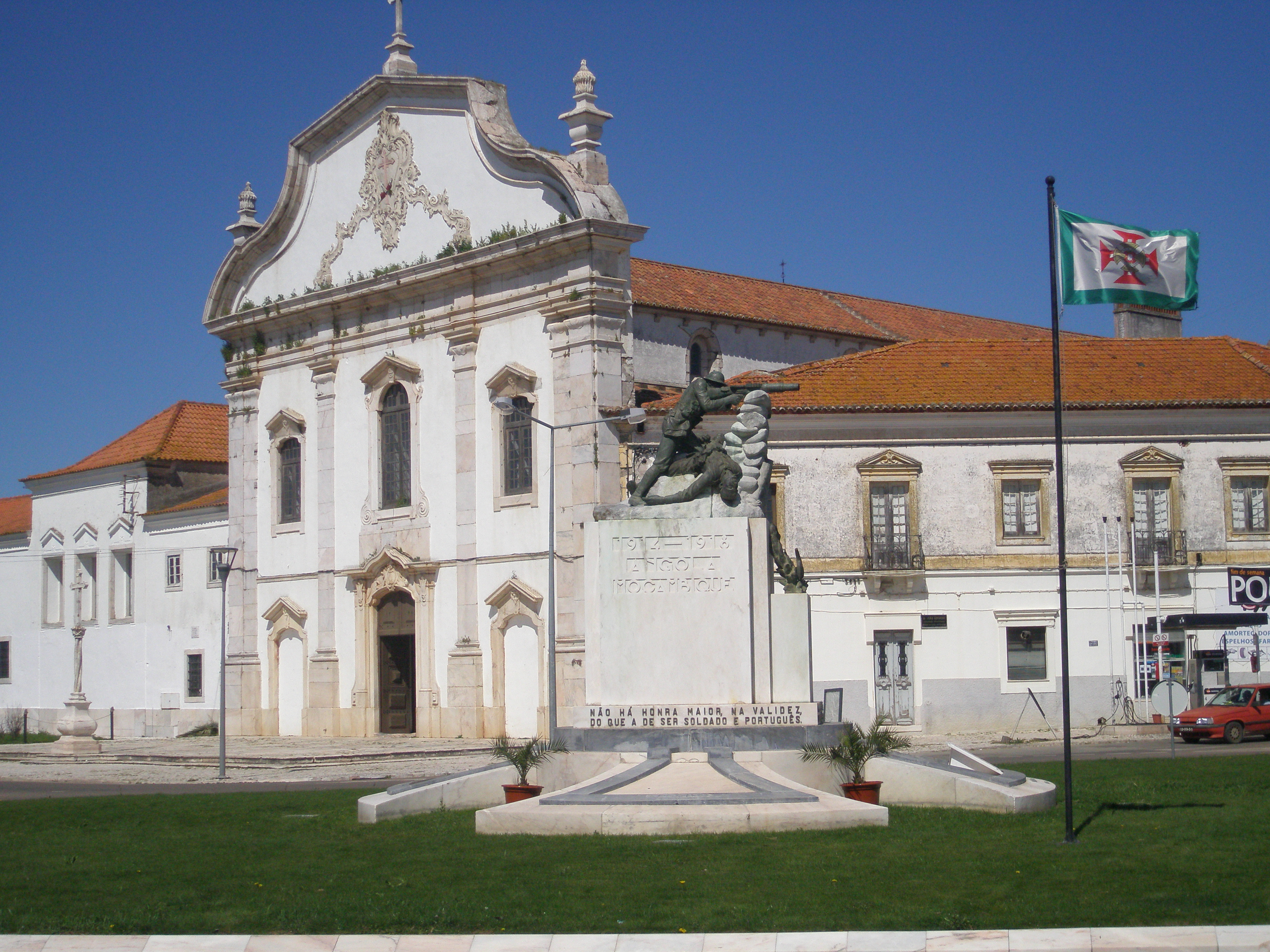
- The main facade of the Church and Convent of São Francisco of Estremoz aEstremoz
- Interactive map of the Convent of São Francisco area

General information
- Type: Convent
- Architectural style: Gothic
- Location: Estremoz (Santa Maria e Santo André), Estremoz, Portugal
- Coordinates: 38°50′38″N 7°35′12.7″W
- Owner: Portuguese Republic

Technical details
- Material: Marble

Design and construction
- Architects: Manuel Francisco; Coelho Guimarães

The Convent of São Francisco (Portuguese: Convento de São Francisco) is a monastery in the civil parish of Estremoz (Santa Maria e Santo André), in the municipality of Estremoz, in the Portuguese district of Évora.

== History ==
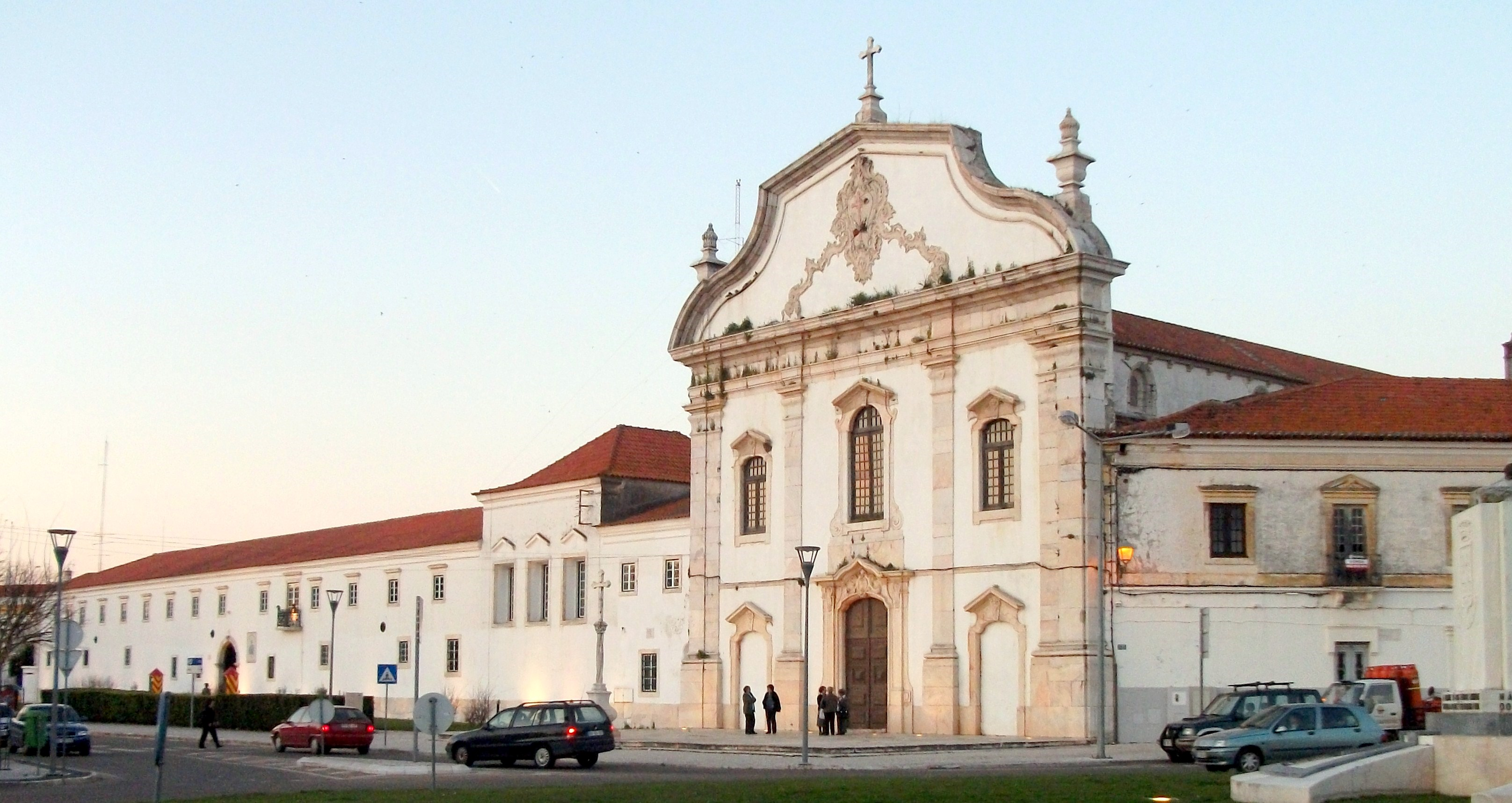
The church and convent dependenies

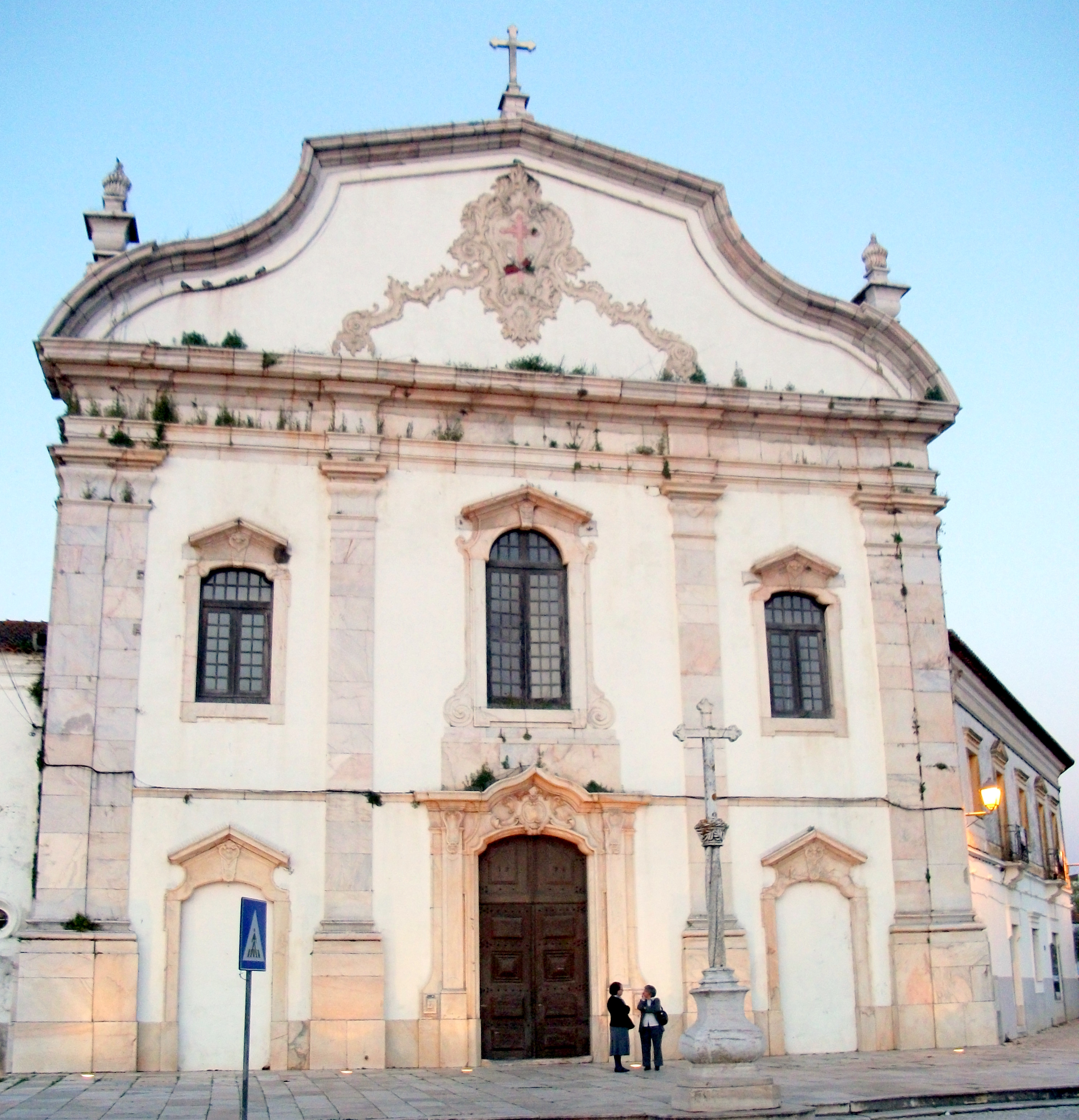
The principal facade of the Baroque church of St. Francis

In 1255, the Royal Convent of Estremoz was founded. The noble Eborense knight, Nuno Martins, was buried at the foot of the cross. First of the cloistered order, he enjoyed royal favour and protection, as he was almost canonical with his fellows.

Between the end of the 14th century and beginning of the 15th century, the tomb of Esteves da Gata was constructed. Sometime during the 15tth century, the chapel of D. Fradique was probably erected, ostensibly before its passing into the governance of the Province of the Algarves, in 1425.

On 19 May 1509, D. Pedro de Castro, finance overseer, received 30 white stones for the convent construction.

On 6 May 1520, a papal bull from Leo X gave license to King D. Manuel I to build a convent to the invocation of St. Francis in the village of Estremoz.

An inscription, dated 3 March 1535, was placed over the portico of the chapel of D. Fradique.

By order of the reformer, the Archbishop Infante D. Henrique delivered in 1541 the observance of the Province of the Algarves.

A gravestone on the wall, over the sarcophagus, was installed in 1624 and reproduced part of another epigraph of 1401.

By the middle of the 18th century, D. Josefa Maria da Silveira, wife of Barnabé Henriques ordered the construction of a chapel dedicated to Christ Child (Portuguese: Capela do Menino Jesus). The tomb of Esteves da Gata which was integrated into a small edicula tomb at the cross of the church was transferred to the entrance to the nave along the epistole.

The temple was remodelled in 1771.

The organ was constructed in 1790 by Manuel Francisco Coelho Guimarães, but it was partially destroyed in the 19th century. In 1876, the ceiling of the chapel of D. Fradique was remodelled and repaired.

The first major works carried out by the DGEMN Direcção Geral dos Edifícios e Monumentos Nacionais (General-Directorate for Buildings and National Monuments) began in the middle of the 20th century, with general restoration work starting in 1944, followed by repairs to the roof in 1947, 1955, 1957 and 1958. Preliminary surveys for the restoration of the chapel of D. Fradique 1963, which proceeded with the consolidation of the cross and general restoration of the ceiling. Secondary repairs preceded in 1970 and in 1975 in the vaulted ceiling, and in 1980, repairs to the chapel contiguous with the sacristy, that include cleaning and revision of the ceiling tile of the Chapel of D. Fradique. Similar repairs in the nave, cross and altar were completed in 1984, as a precursors to the work on the organ in 1999, under the direction of Pedro Guimarães.

The tomb of Esteves da Gata has been classified as a National Monument of Portugal since 1922, and the Church since 1924.

== Architecture ==
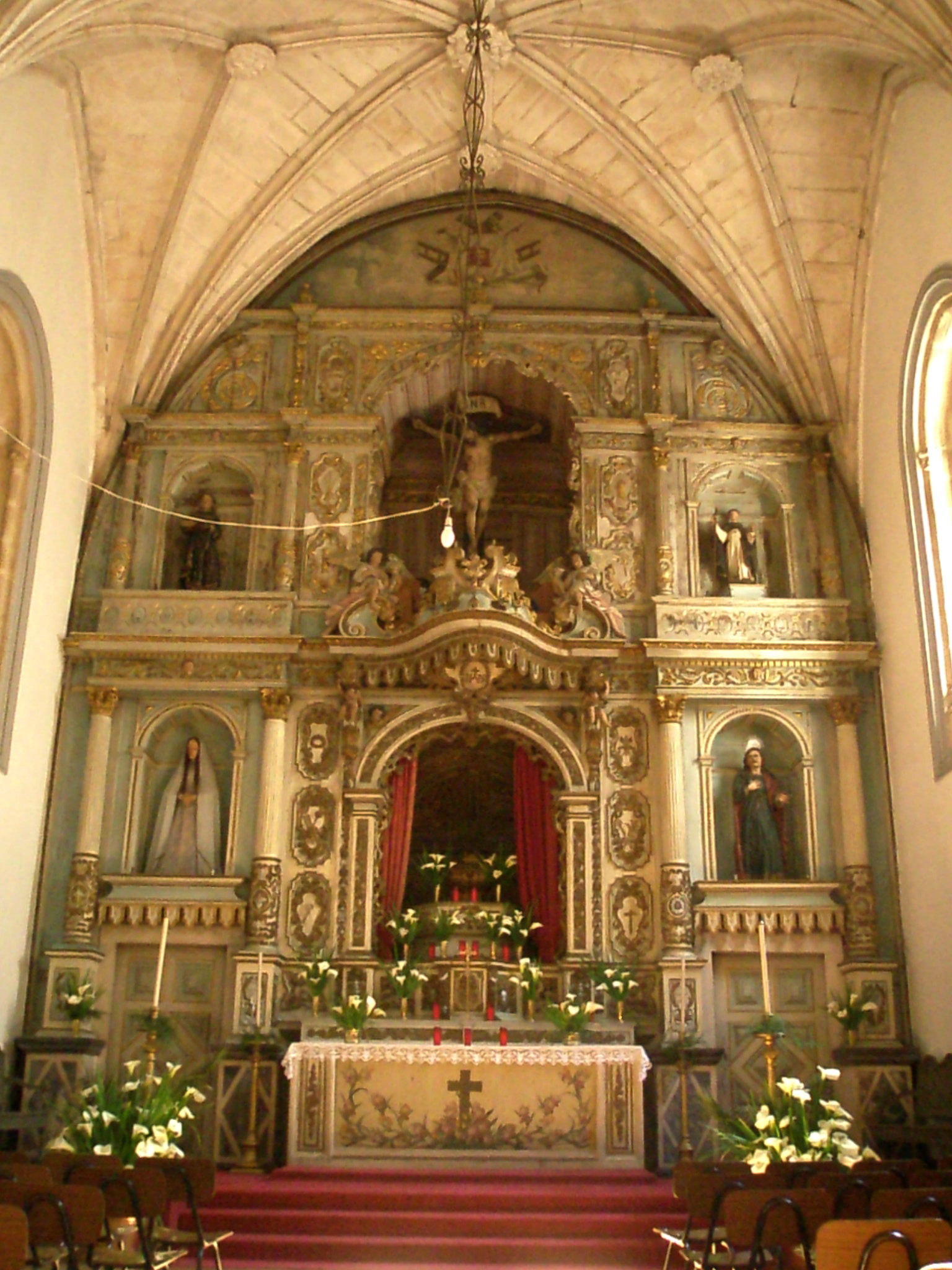
The high-altar of the chapel of D. Fradique

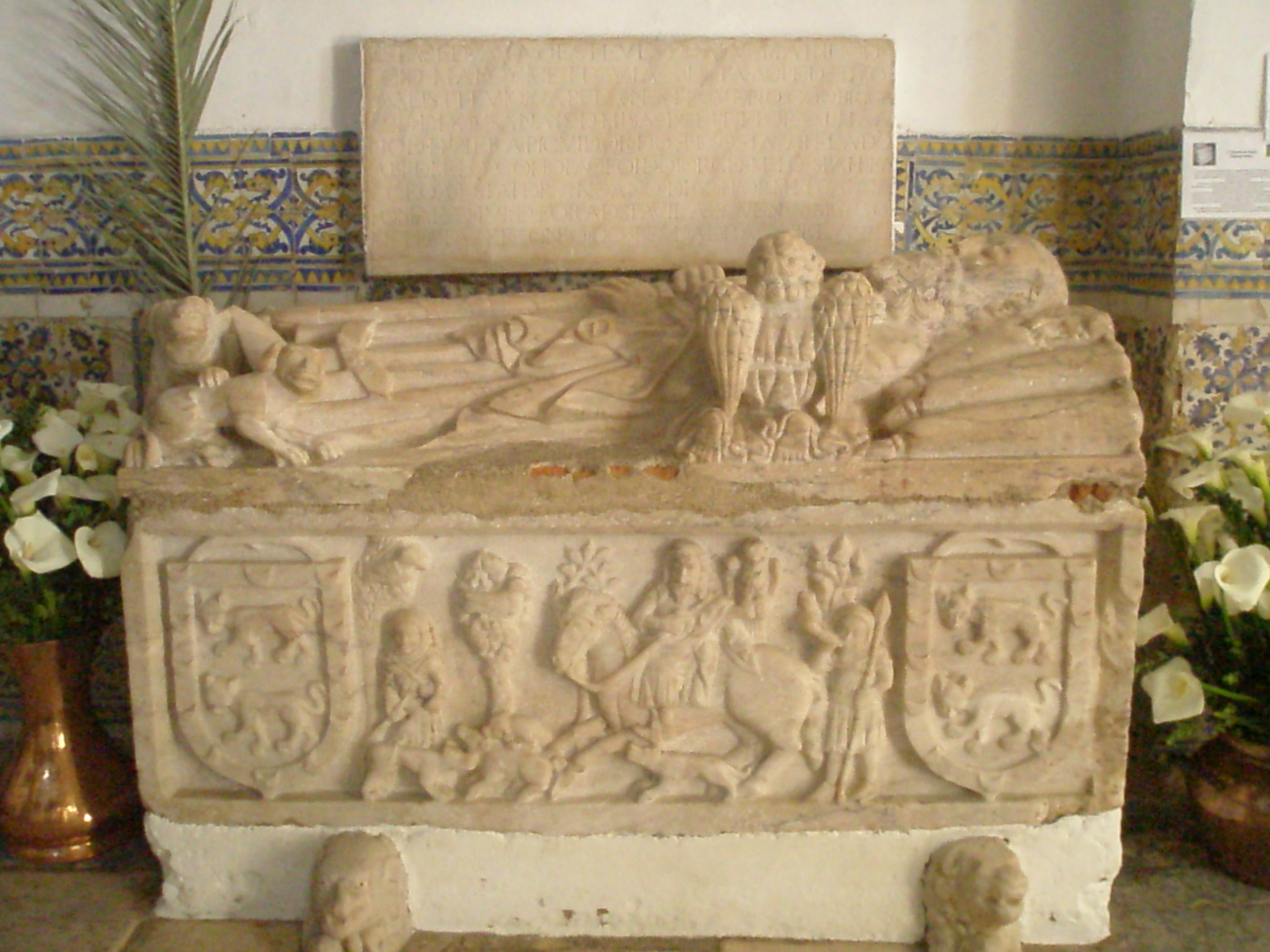
The sarcophagus of Esteves da Gata

The monastery is located in an urban square, on a slope, but outside the medieval burg, alongside the Cross of São Francisco.

The long rectangular plan, includes a transept in the form of a Latin cross with the remains of the primitive church framed in polygonal apses in the south. Not only are the rear arches, nor the tops, are sculpted, suggesting that the areas were covered in Arcosolium.

Its square front is divided in two flights, topped by undulating triangular frontispiece of cornices. Below the architrave, are three broad pillars divide it into three sections, with rectangular windows and ground floor porticos, with triangular cornices above of closed sides of masonry. The tympanum is decorated with masonry, whose sides are strongly constricted into five sections. To the south, abuts the cloister: within its interior is the triple-wide span of the Porta do Sol, with three pointed arches embedded by triangular edicula, with simple squared and geometric colonnades. In the first section, is the chapel of Dom Fradique of Portugal, built against the western wall of the nave, with a wide third section on the side of the epistle.

The central plan, is simple consisting of cubic masses, wedges, divided into two sections in granite stonework, finished in pinnacles and crowned crown with merlons. There are four windows with three archivolts and lateral parapets, with one on each side. The south wing of the transept is truncated adjacent to the cloister.

=== Interior ===
The nave consists of five sections, covered by wood ceiling, separated into galleries by solid silhouetted faces, divided by high arches pointed out from two archivolts, hanging over rectangular pillars, embedded and flanked by thin columns, all topped with phytomorphic crochet capitals. Between the arches, are ogival gaps. In one of the lateral naves there is a chapel wall with the Tree of Jesse. On the lateral face of the southern gallery, is the portico of the Chapel of Dom Fradique and, opposite it (on the epistle side), the tomb of Esteves da Gata. The cross is open to four bands, similar to the nave and chancel, consisting of vaulted ceilings in masonry and triumphal arch dividing the retable. The remaining arm of the transept, as well as the apse, covered in two-ribbed ogival sections, with buttons in black marble, that allow light to filter through slits.
