= Chapel of Nossa Senhora dos Mártires =

- Capela de Nossa Senhora dos Mártires
- Interactive map of the Chapel of Nossa Senhora dos Mártires area

General information
- Type: Hermitage
- Architectural style: Gothic
- Location: Estremoz (Santa Maria e Santo André), Estremoz, Portugal
- Coordinates: 38.8298°N 7.58199°W
- Owner: Portuguese Republic

Technical details
- Material: Granite

The Chapel of Nossa Senhora dos Mártires (Portuguese: Capela de Nossa Senhora dos Mártires), is a hermitage in the civil parish of Estremoz, in the municipality of Estremoz, in the district of Èvora.

== History ==
The chapel was founded in 1371. Oral tradition and chronicles of 1371 suggests that the chapel was constructed by regal initiative (by King D. Fernando), but was completed by the Condestável D. Nuno Álvares Pereira, master of the town of Estremoz.

At one time there existed hospital and administrative annexes, sometime after the 16th century, for the Misericórdia of Estremoz. There was extensive remodelling around 1500, that included the substitution of the high choir.

There were extensions/expansions during the reign of King D. Manuel I, as well as unsuccessful repairs during the 17th and 18th centuries.

There was a general restoration undertaken in 1938. In 1959, the terrace was reconstructed, with the roofing and pavement repaired or replaced in 1966. The marble staircase and vaulting were rebuilt, while the cornerstones were cleaned. Little was accomplished until 1987, when further repairs to the roofing and ceiling of the narthex, including to the architrave, capitals and columns. The following year there was a reconstruction of the nave.

== Architecture ==
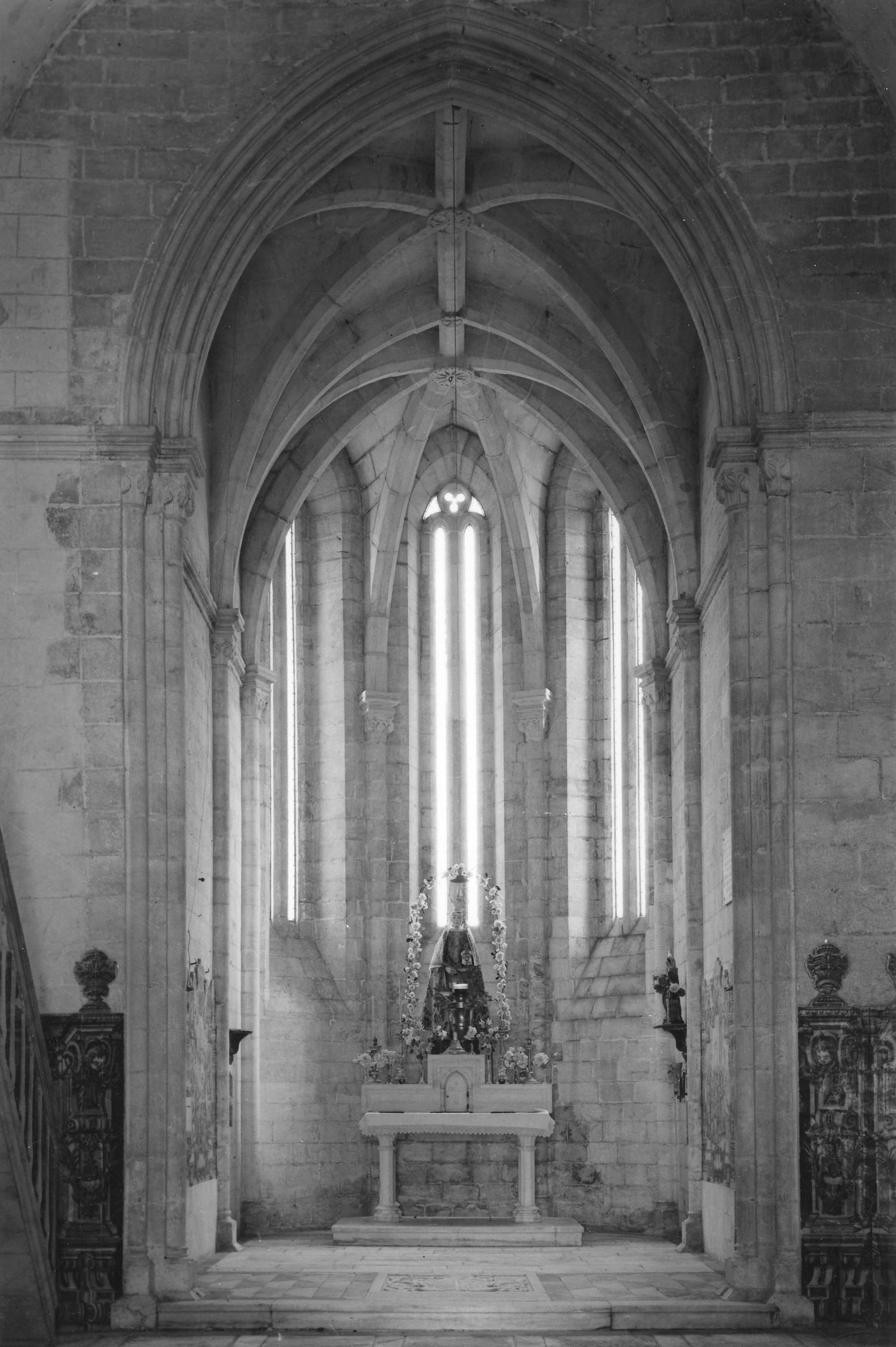
The ribbed vaulted ceiling of the apse in the chapel

The chapel is situated in a rural locale, along a small bend, along with the facilities for the hermit and pilgrims, as well as a small yard overlooking the road.

The building consists of an apse and main nave, fully built in fine-cut marble ashlar, with gabled roof and nave. It is solidly supported by buttresses pending talon over perfect arch, with a Gothic porch supported by corbel framework. The triangular frontispiece with cornice, corresponds to the purest canons of the Gothic monastic tradition, with many of elements stolen in the 17th century, replacing the Rosácea with a simple rectangular window. The nave's front porch, a forced narthex, perhaps used the palatial building nearby, and includes three sections of Tuscan colonnade on high plinths, raising an ashlar architrave. The porch, simple will of pointed arch framed beveled masonry, is flanked by wainscot tile. A similar portico framed by chamfered ashlar and flanked by tile is located in the lateral southern facade. The rear facade is dominated by the polygonal apse supported by buttresses, decorated along the radial axes.

The interior, lit by diffuse light, is illuminated by cracks in the apse and the rose window. The "L"'shaped chapel is divided into a central nave, apse with vaulted ceiling and ancillary room. Along the nave, until half-way along the walls, are azulejo tiles.

Although relatively small, the temple illustrates the architectural style of the late-Gothic style, immediately before the beginning of the Monastery of Batalha. In this context, it represents a long tradition of early medieval Portuguese architecture, namely the expansive volume typical from the 18th century.
