= Lalim =

- Civil parish
- Location in Portugal
- Coordinates: 41.039°N 7.816°W
- Country: Portugal
- Region: Norte
- Intermunic. comm.: Douro
- District: Viseu
- Municipality: Lamego

Area
  - Total: 7.22 km^{2} (2.79 sq mi)
- Elevation: 556 m (1,824 ft)

Population (2011)
  - Total: 729
  - Density: 100/km^{2} (260/sq mi)
- Time zone: UTC+00:00 (WET)
  - Summer (DST): UTC+01:00 (WEST)
- Postal code: 5100
- Area code: 254
- Patron: Santa Maria da Natividade

Lalim is a civil parish (freguesia) in Lamego Municipality in the Viseu District of the Norte Region of Portugal. The population in 2011 was 729, in an area of 7.22 km².

== History ==
Conjecturally, several authors have presupposed that this settlement was founded during the reign of the Moor Ibne-Huim.

It was in Lalim that Count Pedro Afonso, the illegitimate son King Denis lived after the death of his father, leaving the life at court to his brother and new King Afonso IV. The prince, occupied the signeurial estate of Paço de Lalim, where he was remembered for composing many his famous Livro das Cantigas, among other works.

In the 14th century, Lalim was part of the municipality of Castro Rei. Between 1514 and 1834, the parish became the seat of its own municipality when the administration of King Manuel issued a foral (charter), that would include approximately 648 inhabitants by 1801.

At the end of the 18th century, Lalim and Ribelas were reorganized into a new municipality, that persisted until 1834. From 1834 to 1896, it became part of the municipality of Tarouca. When this municipality was extinguished, in June 1896, Lalim began to exist as part of the municipality of Lamego. Its abbey became a representative centre of the Convent of Santa Maria de Salzedas, or Convent of São João de Tarouca, during the 1862 parochial statistics, and supported by their donatários, the Counts of Tarouca.

== Geography ==
Within a valley formed by the Monte de Santa Bárbara and Monte Teleférico, the civil parish is bordered by Lazarim, Melcões, Galvã, Várzea da Serra, Gondomar and Ferreirim. The parish contains the localities Ameal, Carvalhal, Enxertada, Freixo, Lalim, Outeiro, Ponte Nova, Revolta, Ribeiro, Ribelas, Tapada and Veiga.

It is supported by the affluents of the River Varosa, which snake through the municipality of Lamego, forming an accidented relief and dense vegetation of pine, chestnut, heather (Ericaceae), carqueja, tojo, giestas and mimosas trees. This environment supports a diverse fauna including wild boar, fox, wolf and hare.

== Economy ==
On an economic level, agriculture in small parcels, primarily subsistence in character, predominates this region, with the cultivation of corn and vineyards being the focus crops. In addition, civil construction, meat-processing charcuteira and saw-milling provide ancillary service economies to the region.

== Architecture ==
As a symbol of its autonomy, the parish has a planned square alongside its medieval square, where its original civic pillory was constructed, to mark it early history. In addition, visits to the small parish are highlighted by several nationally designated architectural structures, such as:

=== Civic ===
- Medieval Jail of Lalim (Cadeia de Lalim), constructed in the 16th century, although much in ruin, the building is known for the recognizable sculpted coat-of-arms of the Menses family on its facade;
- Pillory of Lalim (Pelourinho de Lalim), the politico-administrative structure was erected in 1514 by King Manuel when the monarch issued a foral (charter) to the settlement;
- Roman Bridge of Lalim (Ponte romana de Lalim), constructed during the late part of the 15th century, the bridge was actually a Romanesque design, following the traits of common Roman designs, and crosses the Ribeira da Tarouca, an affluent of the River Varosela;

=== Religious ===
- Chapel of Nossa Senhora da Conceição (Capela de Nossa Senhora da Conceição), the simple single-nave chapel was constructed off Rua de Nossa Senhora da Conceição, surmounted by two pinnacles and a cross;
- Chapel of Nossa Senhora da Glória (Capela de Nossa Senhora da Glória), the Baroque era nave was actually a replacement to the pre-existing medieval temple, where between 1572 and 1585, Pope Gregory XIII granted an annual jubilee;
- Chapel of Nossa Senhora da Piedade (Capela de Nossa Senhora da Piedade), located on the hilltop of the locality of Piedade, was reconstructed in the Baroque style for the period to replace an older church, from the second half of the 16th century;
- Chapel of São Sebastião (Capela de São Sebastião), the simple single-nave chapel includes narrow retable with primitive carving of the patron saint;
- Hermitage of Nossa Senhora da Aparecida (Ermida de Santo António/Ermida de Nossa Senhora da Aparecida)
- Church of Santa Maria (Igreja Paroquial de Lalim/Igreja de Santa Maria), the parochial church of Lalim, dedicated to Holy Mary (or sometimes Holy Mary of the Nativity), includes main nave and retable, with a single belfry.

== Culture ==
Throughout the year, this parish is the center of both secular and religious celebrations, of which the following are considered popular within and without the territory:

- O Cantar das Janeiras (Singing of January), held between 25 December until then end of January, and involves nightly caroling through the streets, to celebrate the appearance of three magi;
- Leitura do Testamento da Comadre e do Compadre (Reading of the Testament of Godmother and Godfather), held on the day of Carnaval, when the single youth of Lalim deride each other, with a mix of humor and pathose;
- Queima do Judas (Burning of Judas), held on Easter, involves the burning of papermache figures, symbolizing people who, supposedly, betrayed Jesus, while their sins are readout to the gathered public;

Similarly, Lalim is a parish full of religious festivals spread throughout the various months of the year. The festival of Nossa Senhora da Piedade, on the third Sunday of August, is the most popular of these festivities. But, in addition, there are the festivals of São Sebastião (on the third Sunday of January), of Christ (in May), the Virgin Mary, namely Nossa Senhora da Conceição (8 December), and the festivals of the nativity, on 25 December and 1 January, referred to as the Festa do Menino.

The art of basket weaving and ceramics-making continue in Lalim, in a small artesnal shop call Lalinus, which displays local craftsmanship.

Popular foods from this region include the yellow cake of Easter, meat balls, codfish and lamb oven roasted with potatoes and rice. Some of the organized associations within the community include the Associação de Caçadores, the Grupo Desportivo e Cultural and the local band the Sociedade Filarmónica, while the O Grupo de cantadores de Janeiras and the Grupo de Bombos, are organized sporadically for their events (and do not maintain their own buildings).
