= Castle of Evoramonte =

Castle in Estremoz, Portugal

- Castelo de Evoramonte
- Évora, Alentejo Central, Alentejo in Portugal
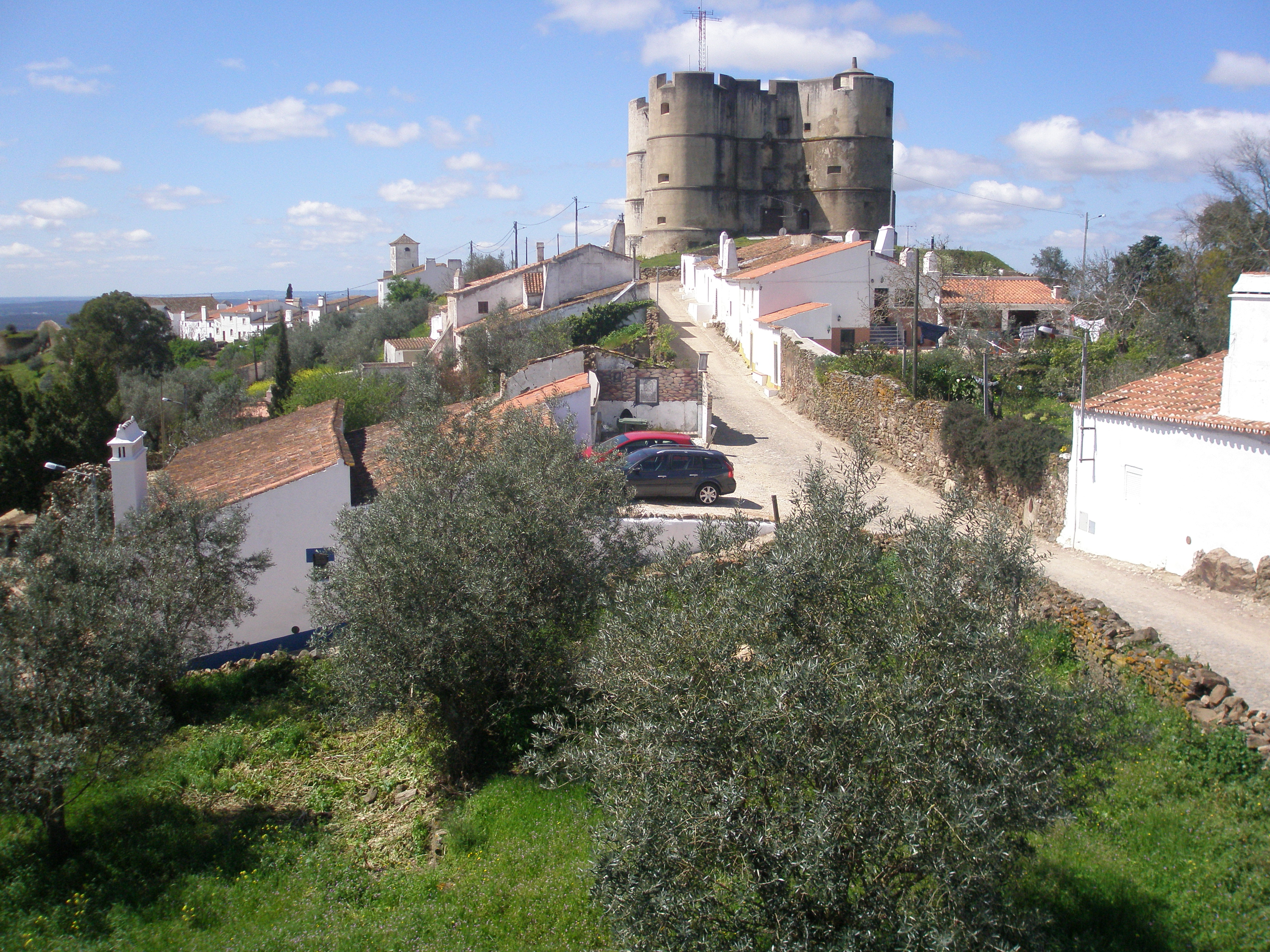
- The smooth surfaces of the castle of Evoramonte visible on the approach to the structure

Site information
- Type: Castle
- Owner: Portuguese Republic
- Operator: DRC Alentejo (Dispatch 829/2009; DR, Série 2 (163), 24 August 2009
- Open to the public: Public

Location
- Coordinates: 38°46′19″N 7°42′57″W

Site history
- Built: 12th Century
- Materials: Stone, Granite, Marble

The Castle of Evoramonte, alternately spelled Évora Monte or Évoramonte, (Portuguese: Castelo de Évora Monte/Castelo de Evoramonte) is a Portuguese castle in the civil parish of Evoramonte, municipality of Estremoz in the former district of Évora. Initiated in 1160, in the Gothic period, it was enlarged in later centuries in the Manueline style. It was at this site that the Concession of Evoramonte (or the Convention of Evoramonte) on was signed on 26 May 1834, that ended Liberal Wars between the Liberal forces of Queen Maria II of Portugal (under the regency of her father Peter VI of Portugal) and Absolutist armies of Miguel of Portugal. Since 1910, it has been listed as a Portuguese National monument.

== History ==
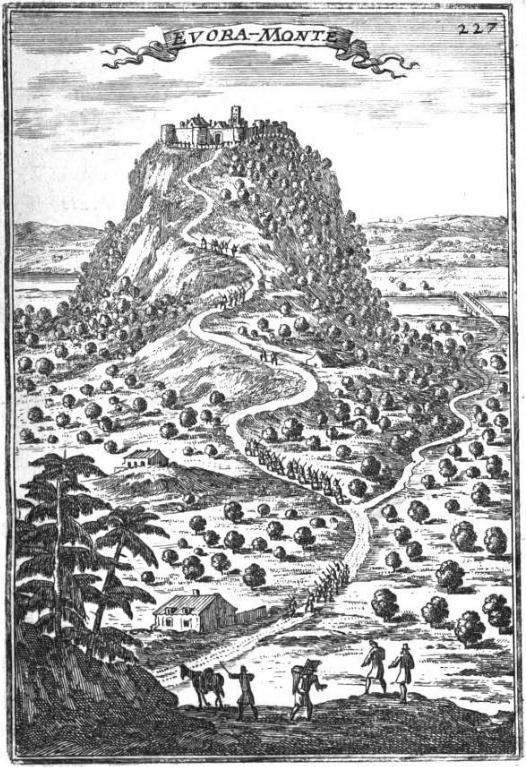
An engraving from 1684, depicting the walled town of Evoramonte, with the tower in the centre

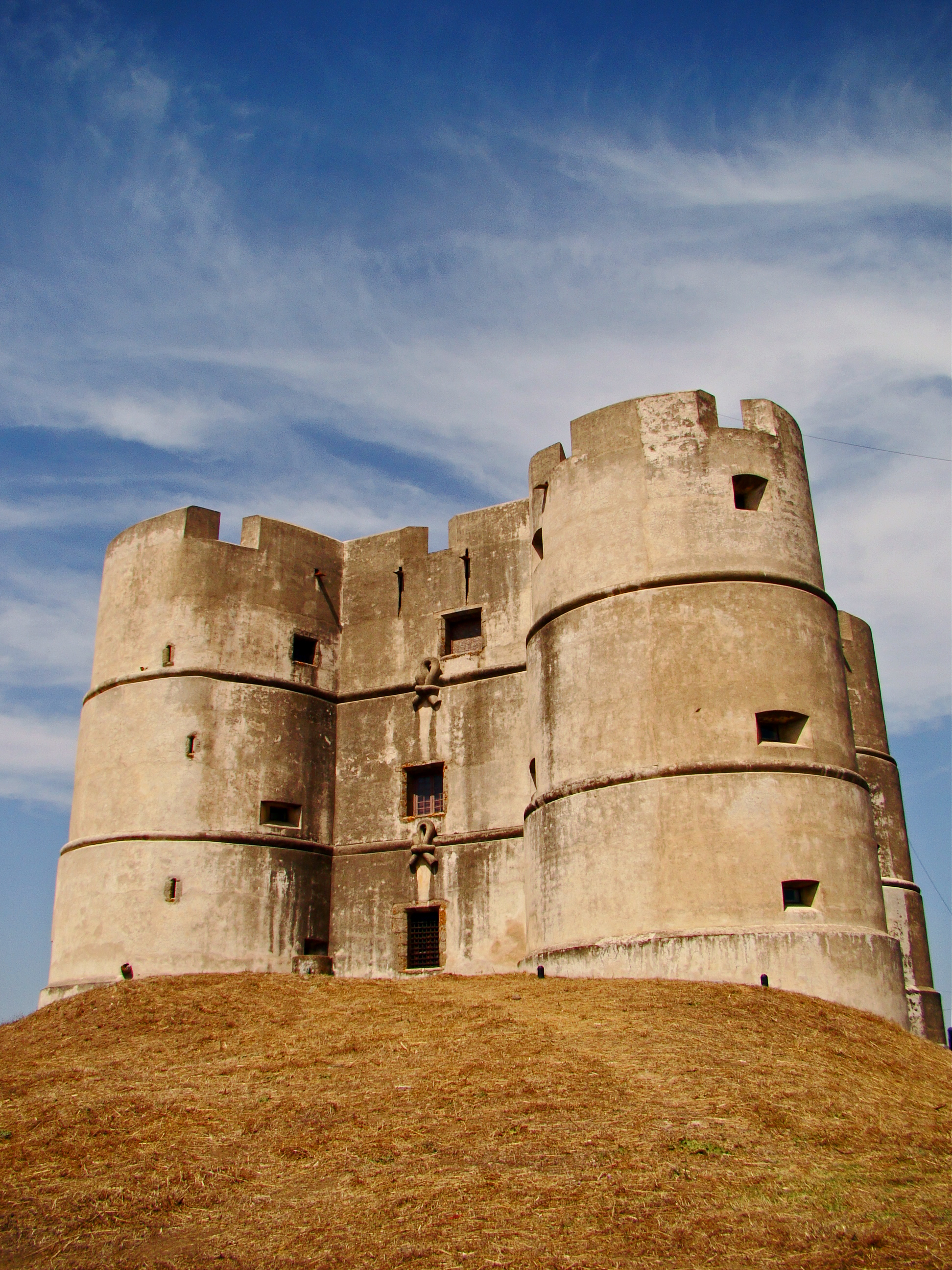
The imposing and sobre surfaces of the Castle of Evoramonte

Sometime during the 12th century, the region of Évora Monte was conquered from the Moors by the forces of Geraldo Sem Pavor. By 1248, a foral (charter) was issued to the region to provide incentives for settlement, which was reaffirmed in 1271.

Around 1306, King Denis ordered the fortification of the town: it was at this time that construction of the castle began, that included the main structure, walls and gates.

After the rise of John I of Portugal to the Portuguese throne, the castle and associated lands were given to the constable Nuno Álvares Pereira, who later passed them on to his grandson.

A new foral was issued in 1516, by King Manuel. The reconstruction campaign during Manuel's reign, beginning in 1516, resulted in the fortification with four cylindrical towers defining the rectangular perimeter by Francisco de Arruda (completed in 1531).

The 1531 Lisbon earthquake destroyed the keep tower of the medieval castle. This structure was then rebuilt by Teodósio I, Duke of Braganza, who, at that time, was master of the region and town.

On 26 May 1834, the Concession of Evoramonte was signed between Miguel of Portugal and his brother Peter IV of Portugal, in the name of his daughter Maria da Glória, ending the Liberal Wars.

In 1855 the municipality of Evoramonte was extinguished, and its historical administration divided into the neighbouring municipalities of Estremoz, Évora, Arraiolos and Redondo.

Between 1930 and 1940, were the first public works to recuperate and renovate the grounds and castle of Evoramonte, under the supervision of the Direcção Geral dos Edifícios e Monumentos Nacionais (DGMEN). These actions, which primarily occurred in 1937, included the restoration of the towers and the consolidation of the parapets.

Subsequent interventions occurred between 1971-1979, in projects to restore the castle; 1980-1981, in the recuperation of the walls; in 1982, the construction of a sanitation system; followed in 1984 by new restoration projects, culminating in the phase two project in 1986 (which included construction and restoration accompanied with photography of the repairs). Finally in 1987, electricity was installed on the grounds.

On 1 June 1992, under Decree 106F/92, this building was transferred into the stewardship of the Instituto Português do Património Arquitectónico (IPPAR), in order to rehabilitate and monetize the structure.

February 2006, marked the beginning of commemorations to celebrate the castle's 700 years of existence.

== Architecture ==
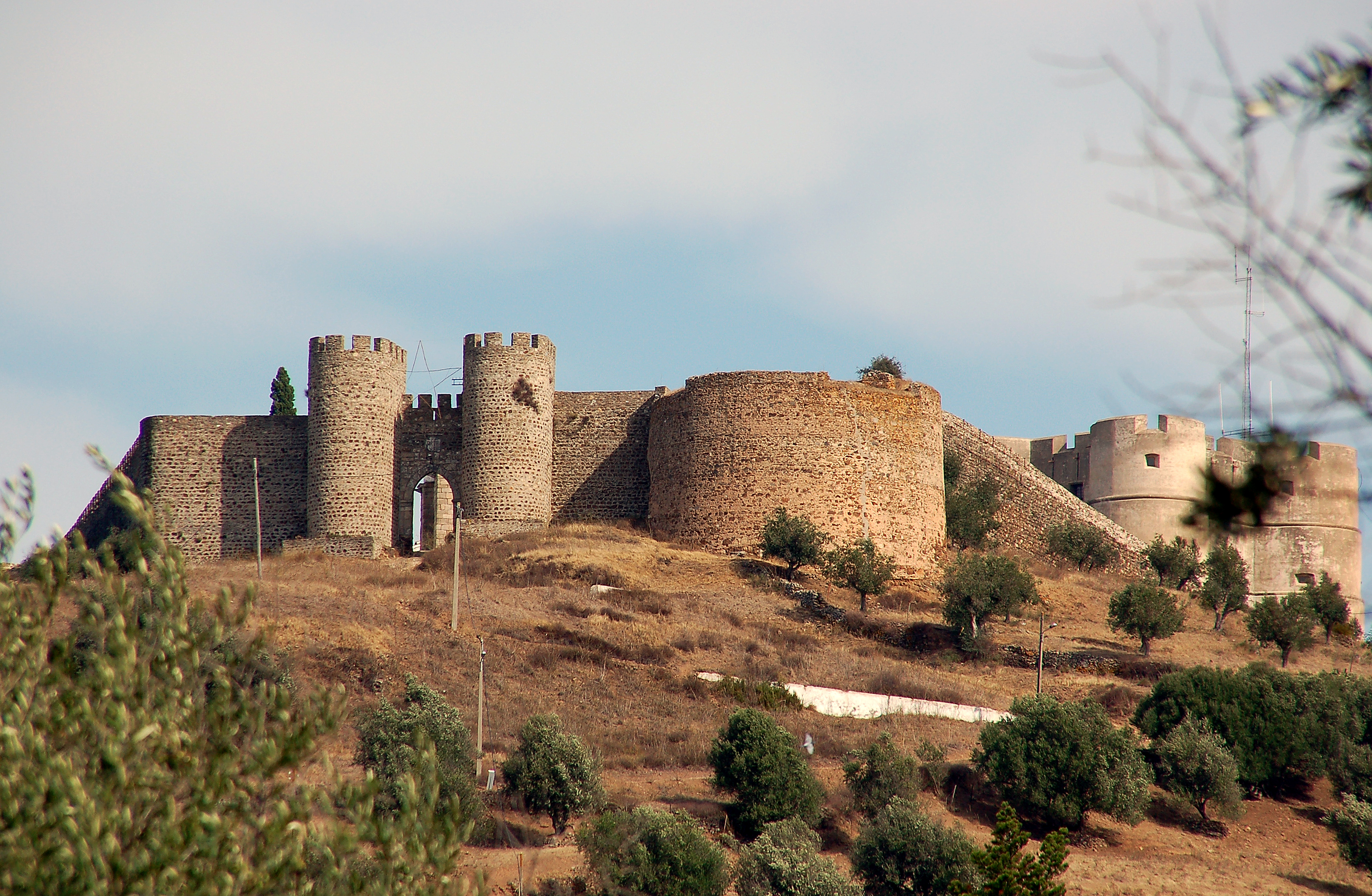
The grey granite of the castle peeking from behind the medieval walls of the old city

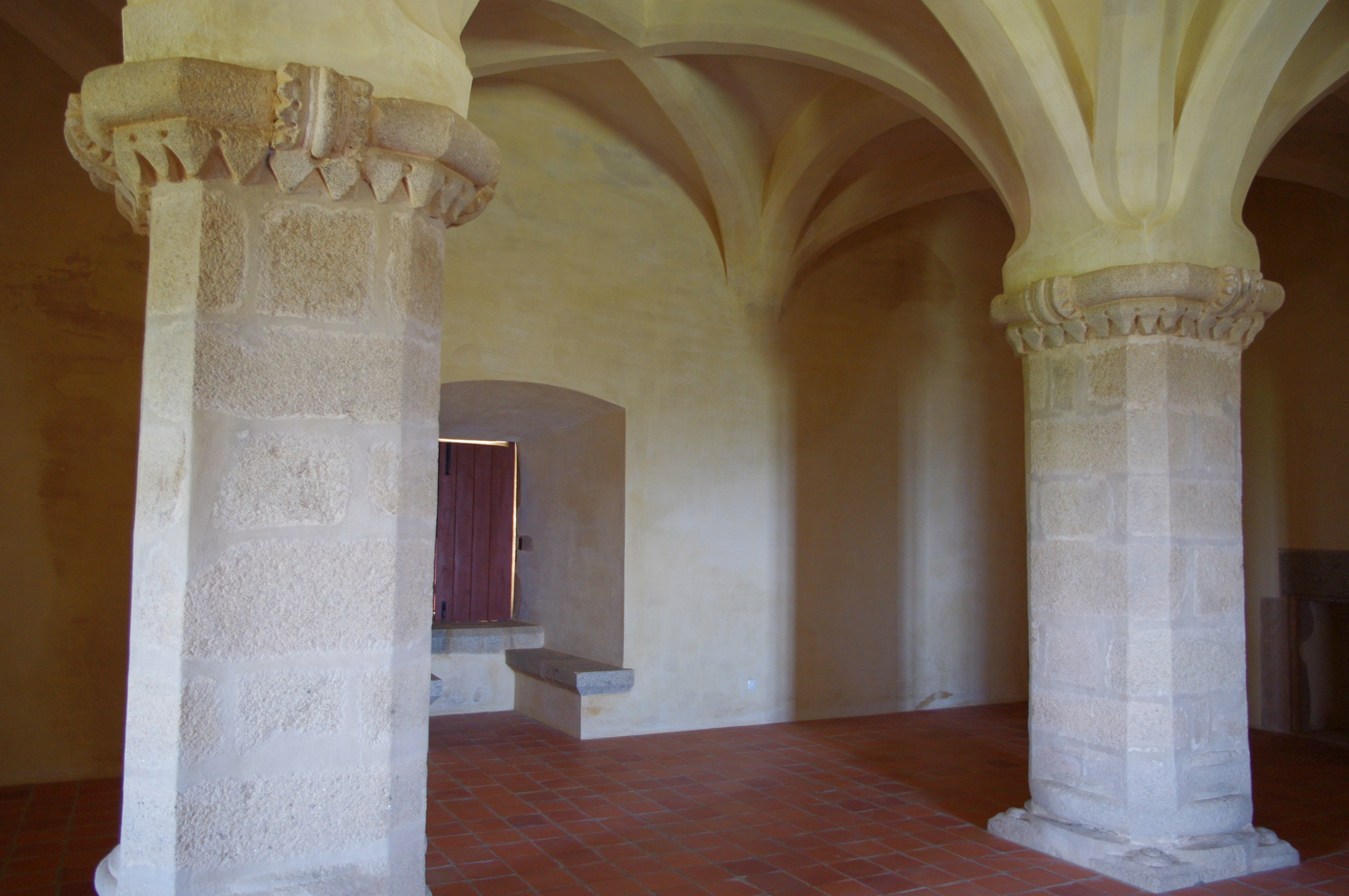
The internal lattice of columns and nerves of the second floor room of the castle

The castle crowns the escarpment of Serra d' Ossa, with a commanding view of the local and distant routes, dominating one of the largest squares in Portugal: the municipality of Estremoz.

An unusual rectangular building, the castle includes circular towers molded into the structure, providing the castle with an aggressive and powerful characteristics. The building is much larger at the base, and is chamfered to the height of its three storeys, and crowned by large merlons. The three floors are clearly delineated by a ring-shaped cornice at each level, typical of the Manueline style, these cornices are sculpted into a rope, tied at the frontispiece of the structure. At various places along the cylindrical towers are canon emplacements, narrower to the interior, that provide an image that is bellicose and somber. On each storey there is a rectangular window, except on the ground floor exposed to the north, where a portico is fixed.

In the large salon on the first floor, the vaulted ovular ceiling is supported by four columns, and raised into a mess of sculpted veins. A similar lattice, though smaller, is used in the remaining floors. By the cylindrical towers in the west, a circular staircase provides access to successive floors.
