= Castle of Estremoz =

Portuguese castle

Coordinates: 38°50′31″N 7°35′32″W

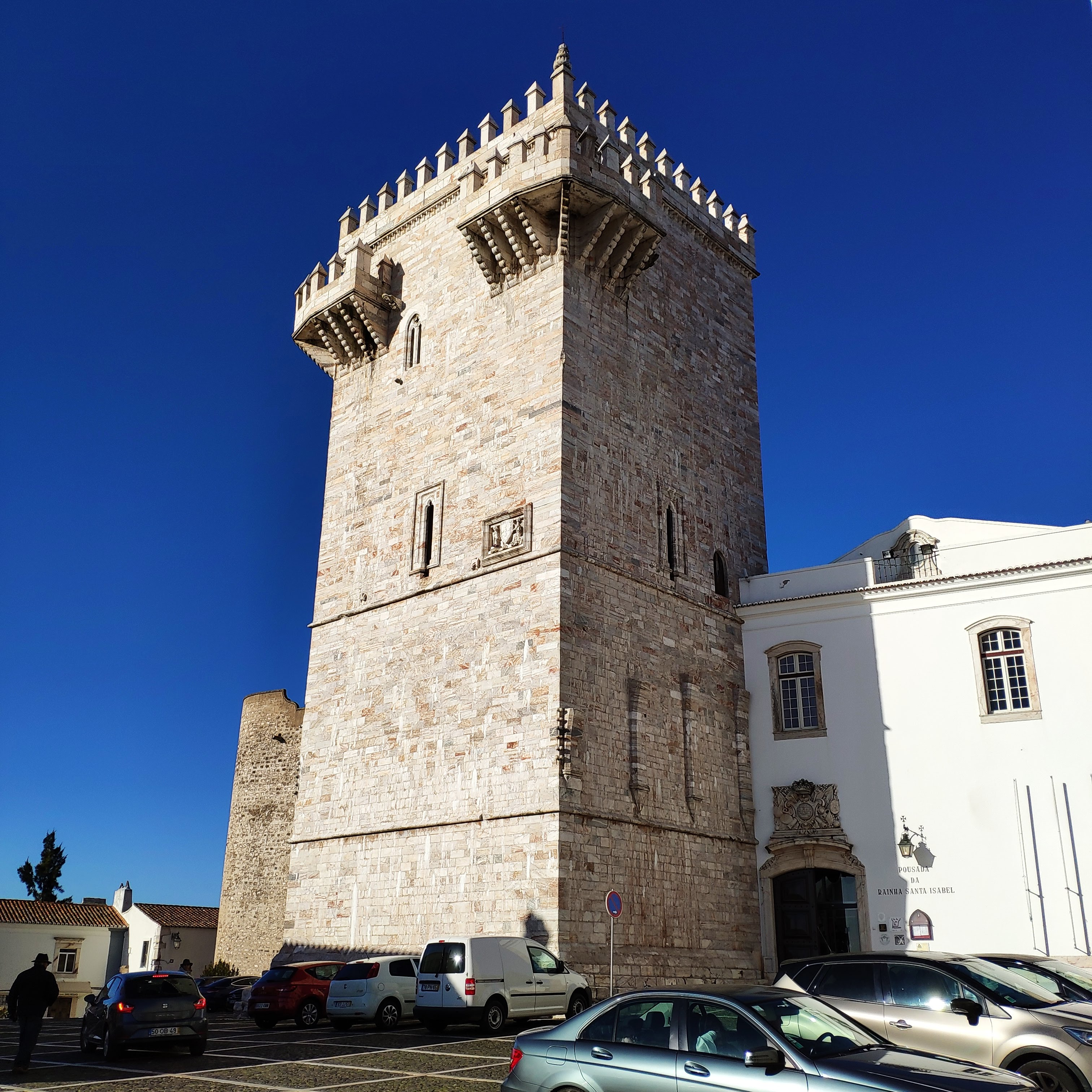
Estremoz castle.

The Castle of Estremoz (Portuguese: Castelo de Estremoz) is a medieval castle in the civil parish of Santa Maria de Devassa, municipality of Estremoz, Portuguese district of Évora.

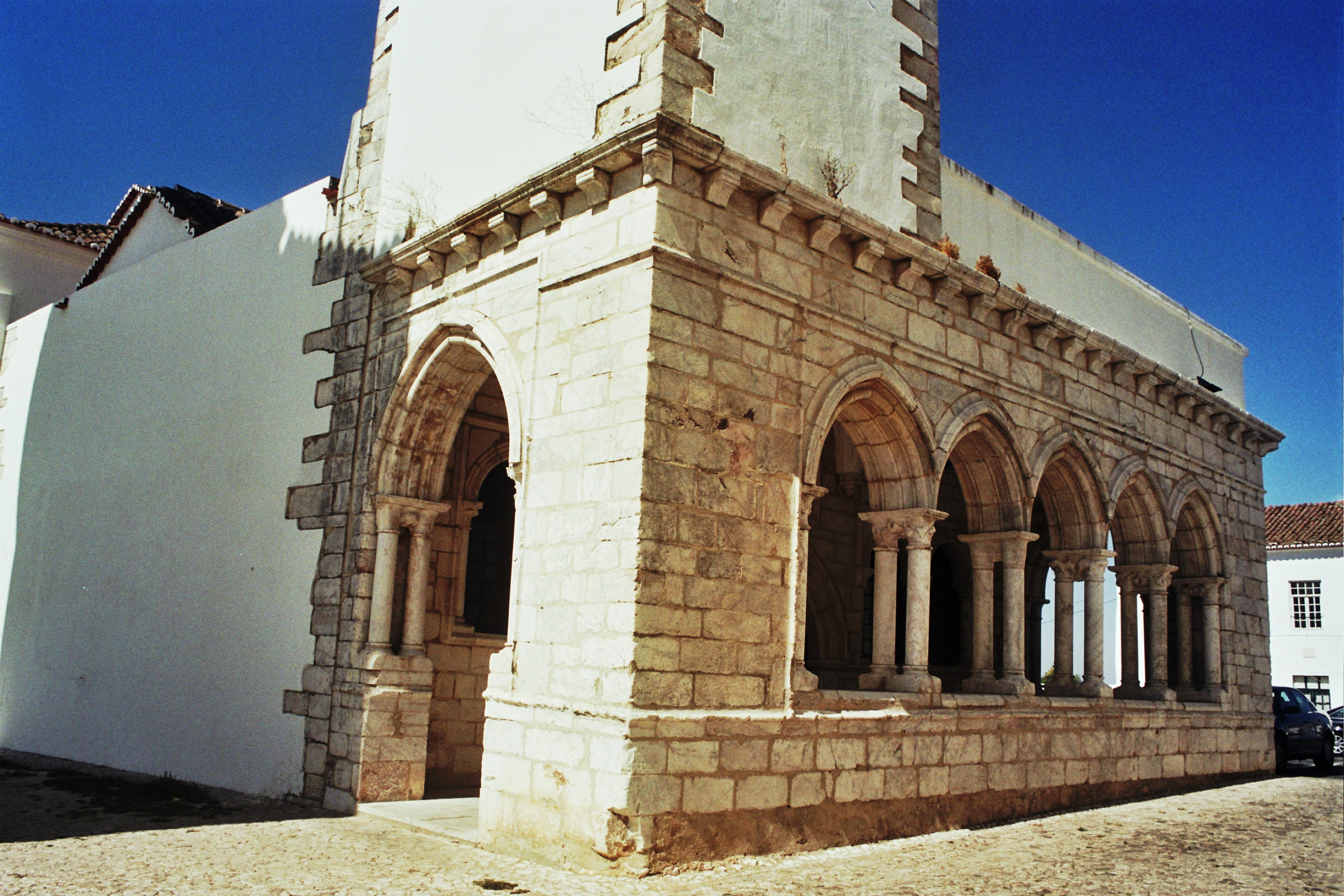

It is classified as a National Monument.
