= Igreja de São Francisco (Estremoz) =

Church in Estremoz, Portugal

Coordinates: 38.8437°N 7.5868°W

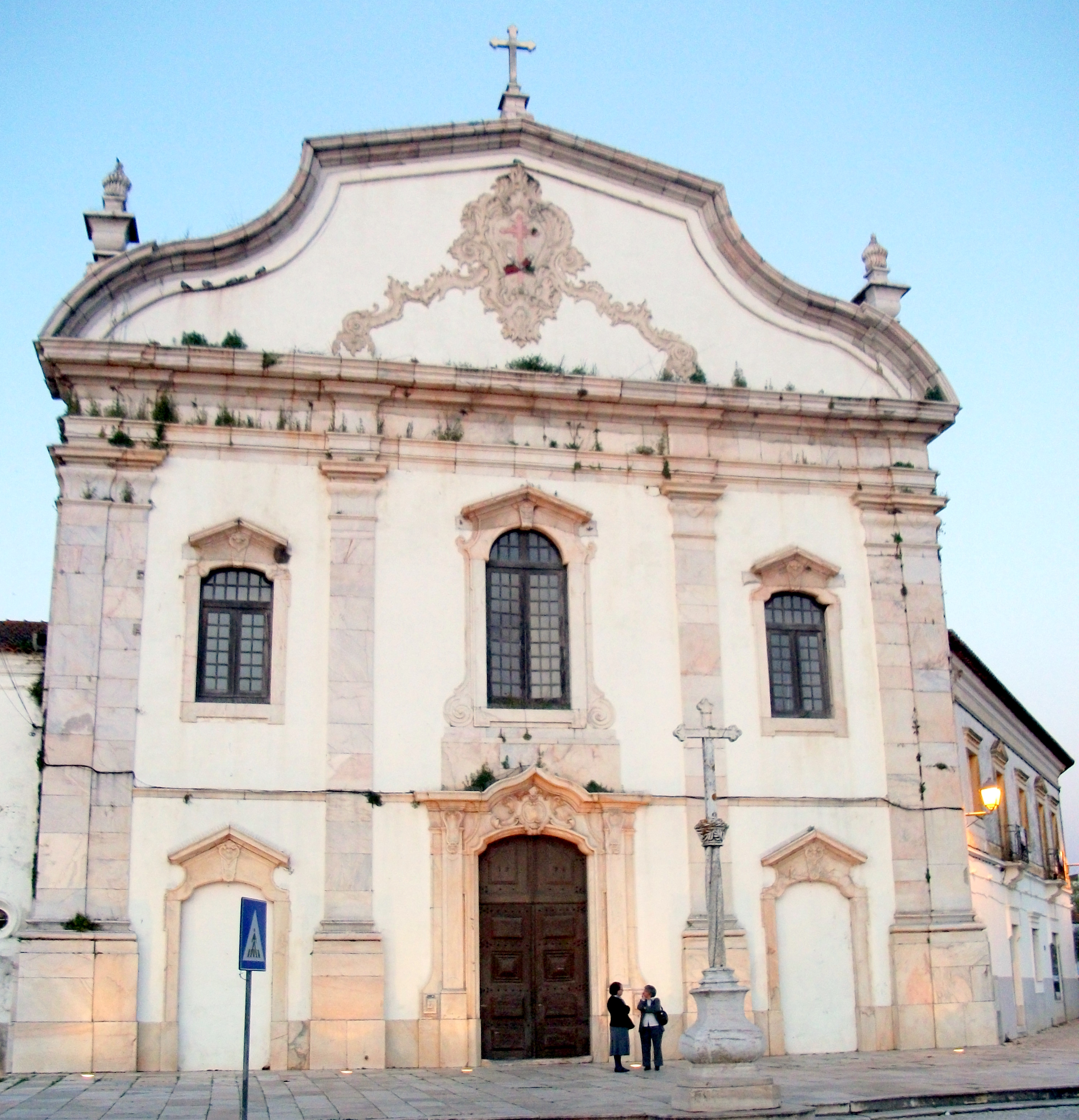
Igreja de São Francisco.

The Igreja de São Francisco is a church in Estremoz Municipality, Évora District, Portugal. It is classified as a national monument.
