= Evoramonte =

- Civil parish
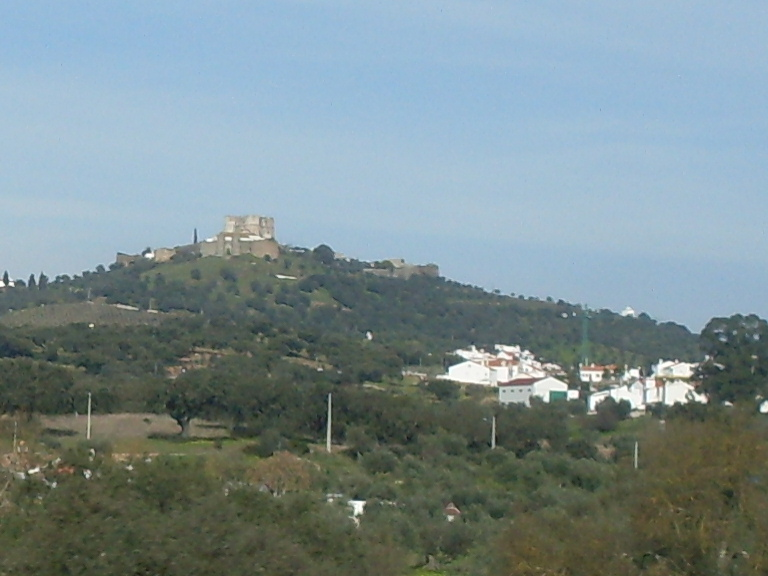
- The village and the Castle of Evoramonte

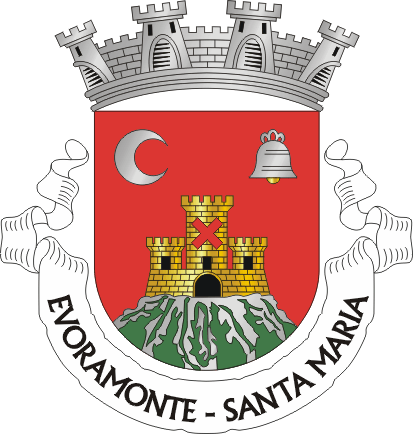
- Coat of arms

- Location in Portugal
- Coordinates: 38.765°N 7.716°W
- Country: Portugal
- Region: Alentejo
- Intermunic. comm.: Alentejo Central
- District: Évora
- Municipality: Estremoz

Area
  - Total: 99.38 km^{2} (38.37 sq mi)

Population (2011)
  - Total: 569
  - Density: 5.73/km^{2} (14.8/sq mi)
- Time zone: UTC+00:00 (WET)
  - Summer (DST): UTC+01:00 (WEST)
- Postal code: 7100
- Area code: 268
- Patron: Santa Maria

Evoramonte, or Évora-monte, (officially spelled Évora Monte) is a civil parish in the municipality of Estremoz in the Alentejo Central subregion of Portugal. The population in 2011 was 569, in an area of 99.38 km^{2}.

== History ==
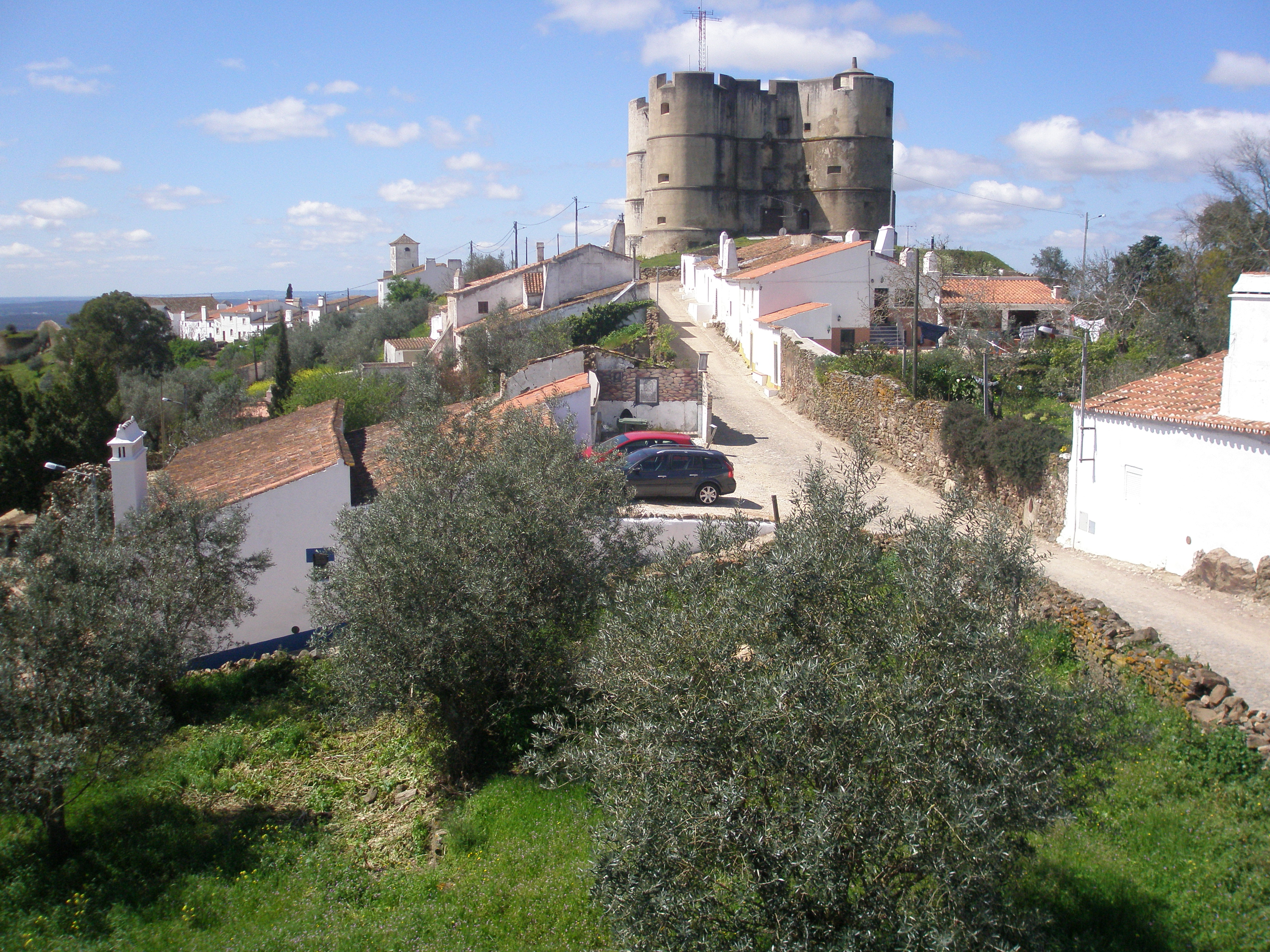
The village of Evoramonte and the view to the castle

Distinguished by its historic castle, the territory was founded in 1160.

The parish of Evoramonte was issued a foral (charter) in 1248 by King D Afonso III, with further administrative privileges granted in 1271. The town was fortified in 1306 on the order of King Dinis.

Around 1801, there were approximately 2661 inhabitants in the municipality of Evoramonte, an area that included approximately 227 square kilometres (88 mi^{2}). At that time, the municipality included five parishes: Evoramonte, São Pedro, São Bento do Mato, Freixo and Vidigão. After the administrative reforms that started with beginnings of Liberalism, the parish of Santa Justa was annexed to the municipal authority. In 1849, there were 3030 inhabitants in a territory of 270 square kilometres (100 mi^{2}).

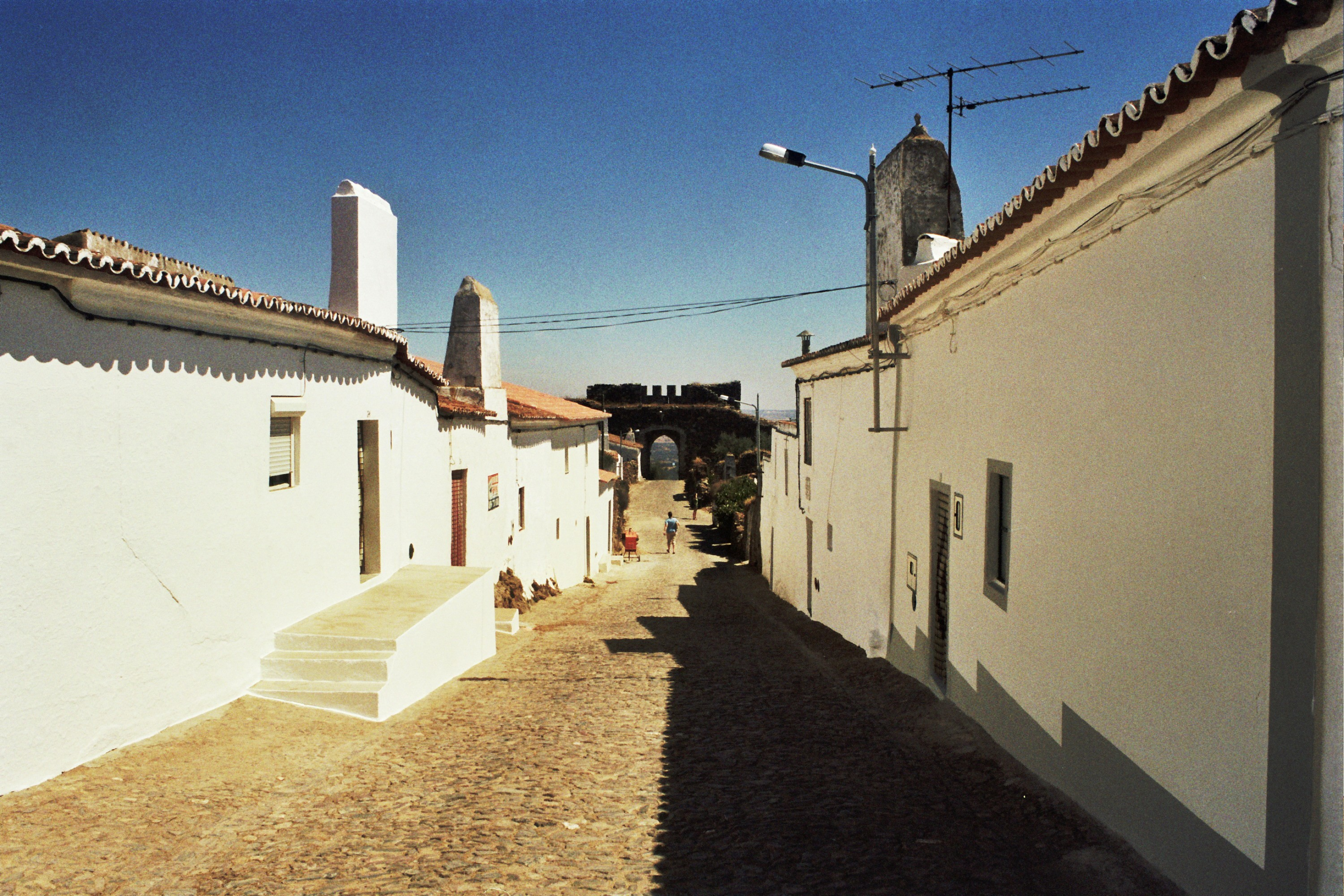
Casa do Convenção de Evoramonte

It was on 26 May 1834, that the historical Convenção de Evoramonte (Concession of Evoramonte) was signed between the forces of Queen Maria II (under her father Peter IV), and the forces of Miguel I, ending the Liberal Wars between liberal and absolutist forces. Consequently, Miguel was forced into exile

The municipality of Évora Monte was extinguished in the reforms of 1855, and its territory partitioned among the neighboring municipalities of Estremoz, Évora, Arraiolos, and Redondo.

The possession of the House of Braganza, it was a municipality until the 19th century.
