= Estremoz =

- Municipality
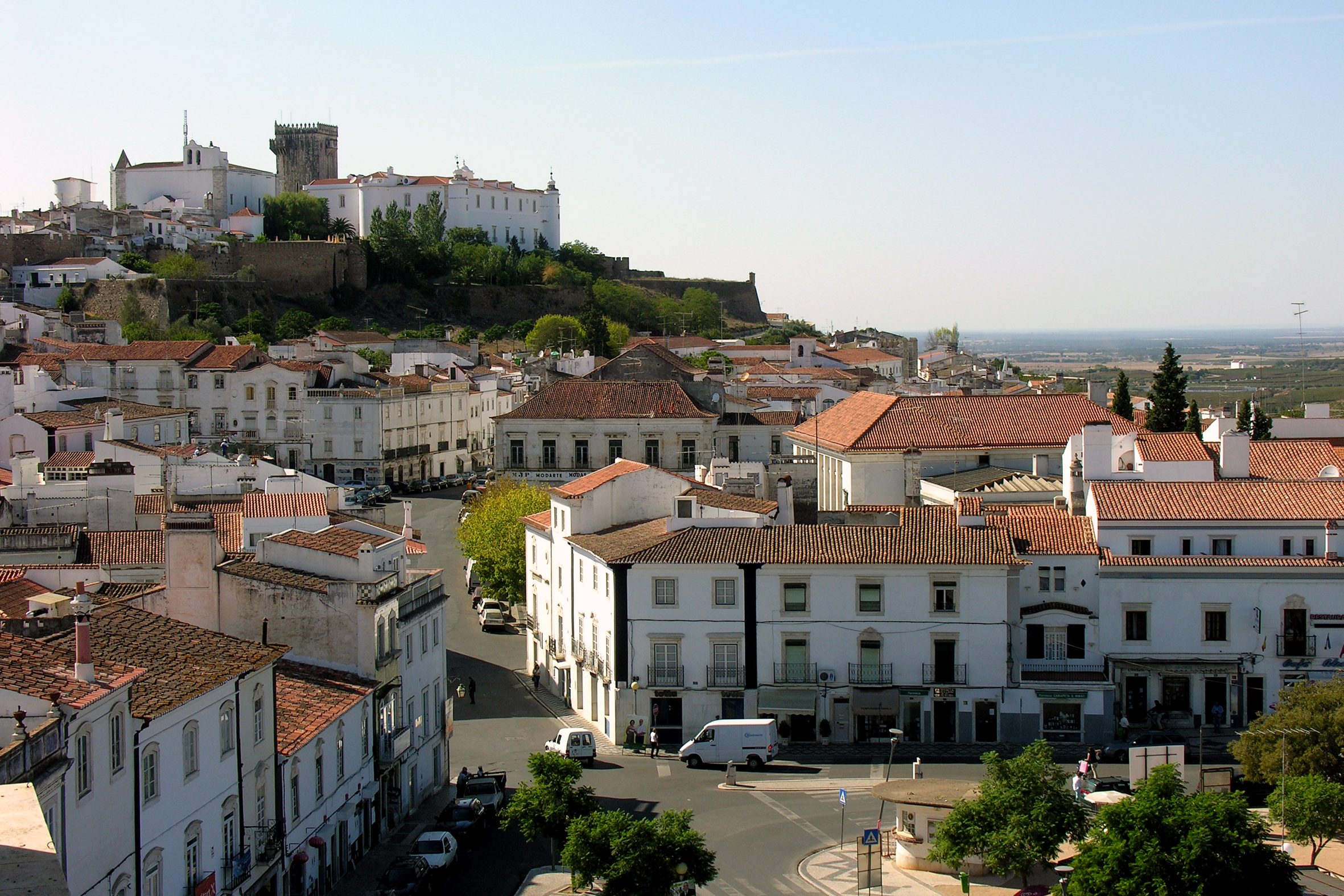

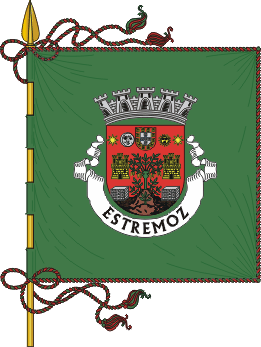
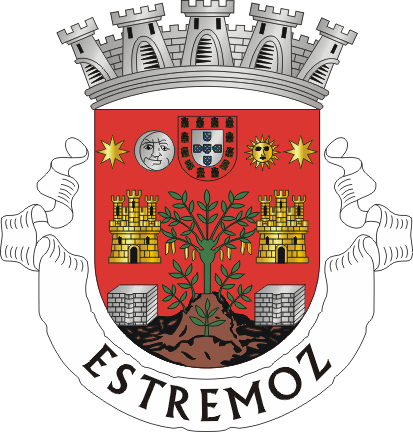
- Flag Coat of arms
- Interactive map of Estremoz
- Location in Portugal
- Coordinates: 38°51′N 7°35′W
- Country: Portugal
- Region: Alentejo
- Intermunic. comm.: Alentejo Central
- District: Évora
- Parishes: 9

Government
  - President: Luis Filipe Pereira Mourinha (Ind.)

Area
  - Total: 513.80 km^{2} (198.38 sq mi)

Population (2011)
  - Total: 14,318
  - Density: 27.867/km^{2} (72.175/sq mi)
- Time zone: UTC+00:00 (WET)
  - Summer (DST): UTC+01:00 (WEST)
- Local holiday: Ascension Day date varies
- Website: http://www.cm-estremoz.pt

Estremoz (Portuguese pronunciation: [ɨʃtɾɨˈmoʃ]) is a municipality in the Évora district, in Portugal. The population in 2011 was 14,318, in an area of 513.80 km^{2}. The city Estremoz itself had a population of 7,682 in 2001. It is located in the Alentejo region.

== History ==
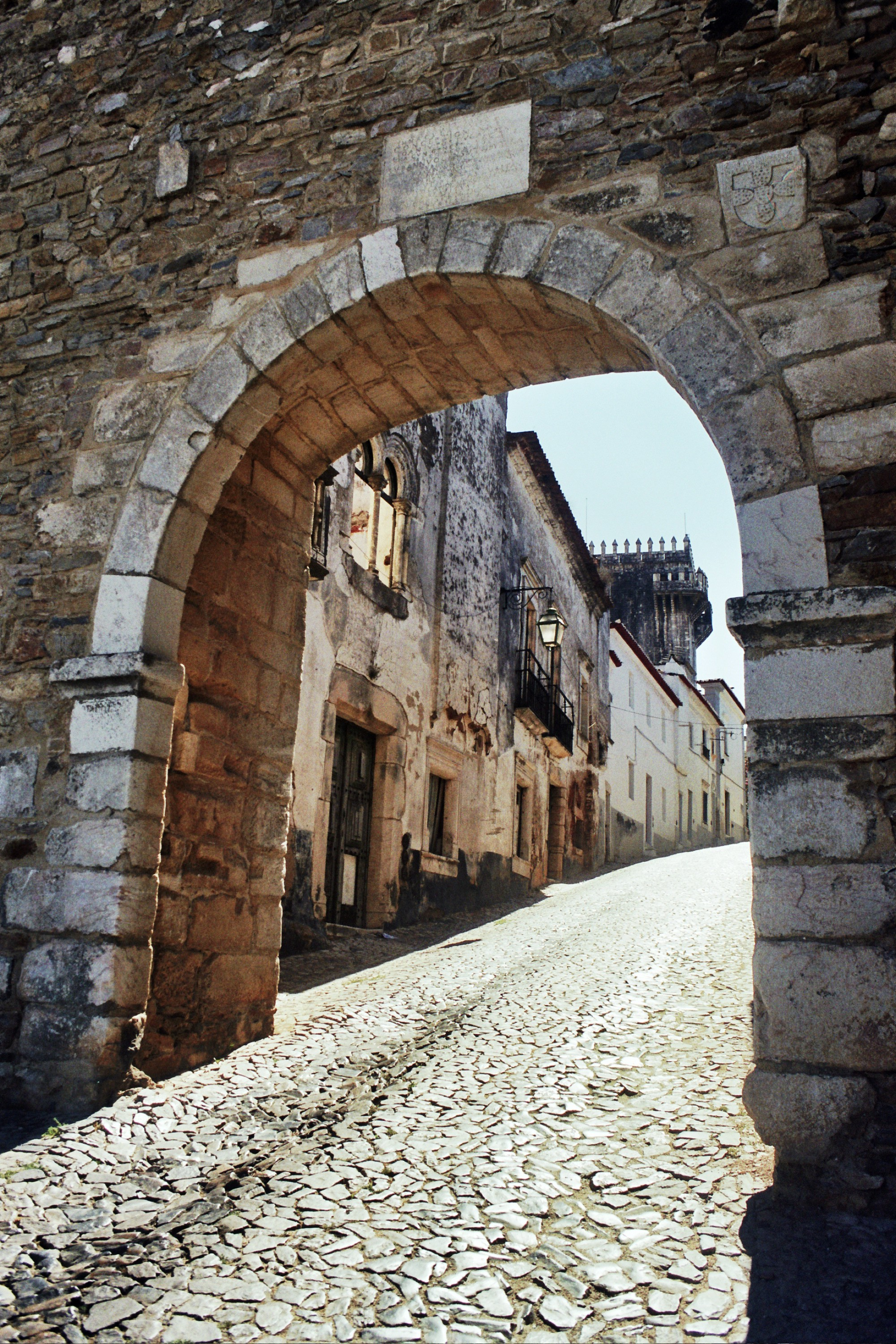
Estremoz, 13th century entrance

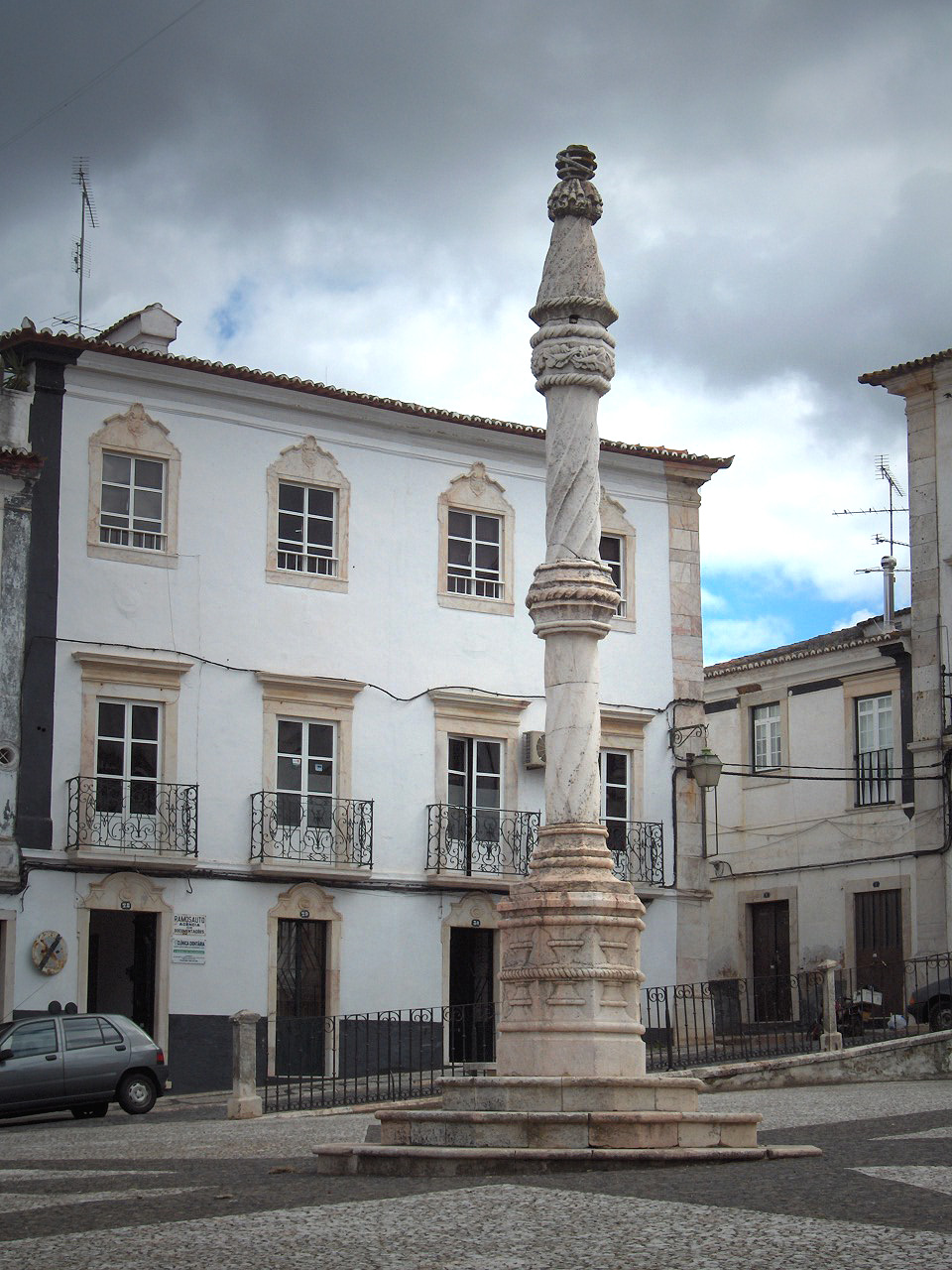
Central square of Estremoz with a marble pillory in Manueline style (originally from the early 16th century, restored in the 20th century.

The region around Estremoz has been inhabited since pre-historic times. There are also vestiges of Roman, Visigoth and Muslim occupation.

During the Reconquista, Estremoz was captured in the 12th century by the army of knight Geraldo Sem Pavor (Gerald the Fearless), who had also conquered neighbouring Évora. However, Estremoz was soon retaken by the Moors and only in the mid-13th century was it reconquered by the Portuguese King Sancho II.

An important strategic site between the Kingdoms of Portugal and Castile, Estremoz received a charter (fuero) in 1258 from Afonso III after the Moors were driven out a second time, which promoted Christian colonization in the area. King Dinis rebuilt the castle as a royal palace, further promoting the area. His widow, Dowager Queen Elizabeth of Portugal, died in Estremoz castle on July 4, 1336, shortly after mediating a peace treaty between her son Alfonso IV of Portugal and grandson Alfonso XI of Castile. Her grandson Pedro I of Portugal died in the Franciscan monastery at Estremoz in 1367. During the 1383–1385 Crisis, Nuno Álvares Pereira established his headquarters in Estremoz, then defeated the Castilian forces at the Battle of Atoleiros.

During the Portuguese Restoration War (1640–1668), Portuguese forces (including from Estremoz) defeated the Castilians in the nearby and decisive Battles of Ameixial (1663) and Montes Claros (1665).

== Geography ==
Administratively, the municipality is divided into 9 civil parishes (freguesias):

- Ameixial (Santa Vitória e São Bento)
- Arcos
- Estremoz (Santa Maria e Santo André)
- Évora Monte (Santa Maria)
- Glória
- São Bento do Cortiço e Santo Estêvão
- São Domingos de Ana Loura
- São Lourenço de Mamporcão e São Bento de Ana Loura
- Veiros

== Economy ==
Marble quarry near Vila Viçosa

Together with the two other marble towns, Borba and Vila Viçosa, Estremoz is internationally known for its fine to medium marble that occurs in several colours: white, cream, pink, grey or black and streaks with any combination of these colours. Especially the pink marble (Rosa Aurora and Estremoz Pink) is in high demand.

This marble has been used since Antiquity as a material for sculpture and architecture. The first exports in Roman times were probably for the construction of the Circus Maximus of Emerita Augusta, in modern-day Spain. The Portuguese navigators exported this marble to Africa, India and Brazil. The marble from this region was used in famed locations such as the Monastery of Jerónimos, the Monastery of Batalha, the Monastery of Alcobaça and the Tower of Belém.

There is so much marble around Estremoz that it is used everywhere; even the doorsteps, pavements and the cobble stones are made out of marble. This marble is even converted into whitewash for painting the houses.

Portugal is the second largest exporter of marble in the world, surpassed only by Italy (Carrara marble). About 85% of this marble (over 370,000 tons) is produced around Estremoz.

In the quarries marble blocks are cut from the rock with a diamond wire saw, a durable steel cable with a series of circular diamond beads. The initial conduit for the wire is made by drilling a horizontal hole and a vertical hole of which the ends meet exactly inside the rock. The wire saw may need a day to cut through the marble. The Estremoz marble has been designated by the International Union of Geological Sciences as a Global Heritage Stone Resource.

== Architecture ==
=== Archaeological ===
- Atalaia das Casas Novas/Atalaia da Frandina

=== Civic ===
- Café Aguias d'Ouro (Portuguese: Edifício no Rossio do Marquês de Pombal, 27/Café Águias d' Ouro)
- Estremoz Caixa Geral dos Depósitos (Portuguese: Edifício da Caixa Geral de Depósitos, CGD, de Estremoz)
- Estremoz Postal, Telegraph and Telephones (CTT) (Portuguese: Building Edifício dos Correios, Telégrafos e Telefones, CTT, de Estremoz)
- Jailhouse of Estremoz (Portuguese: Cadeia de Estremoz)
- Municipal Palace/Hall of Evoramonte (Portuguese: Câmara Municipal e Cadeia de Évora Monte/Paços do Concelho de Evoramonte)
- Municipal Palace/Hall of Estremoz (Portuguese: Casa do Alcaide-mor/Câmara Municipal de Estremoz)
- National Tuberculosos Assistance Dispensary (Portuguese: Dispensário da Assistência Nacional aos Tuberculosos, IANT, de Estremoz)

=== Military ===
- Castle of Estremoz (Portuguese: Castelo de Estremoz/Pousada Rainha Santa Isabel)
- Castle of Evoramonte (Portuguese: Castelo de Evoramonte ou Évora Monte/Castelo e cerca urbana de Evoramonte)
- Castle of Vieros (Portuguese: Castelo de Veiros/Castelo e cerca urbana de Veiros)

=== Religious ===
- Chapel of Nossa Senhora da Conceição (Portuguese: Capela de Nossa Senhora da Conceição)
- Chapel of Nossa Senhora dos Mártires (Portuguese: Capela de Nossa Senhora dos Mártires)
- Chapel of Santa Margarida (Portuguese: Capela de Santa Margarida)
- Convent of the Congregation (Portuguese: Convento dos Congregados/Câmara Municipal de Estremoz/Biblioteca Municipal de Estremoz/Museu de Arte Sacra de Estremoz)
- Convent of Santo António (Portuguese: Estremoz Convento de Santo António de Estremoz)
- Convent of São Francisco (Portuguese: Convento de São Francisco de Estremoz)
- Cross of the Misericórdia (Portuguese: Cruzeiro da Misericórdia de Estremoz)
- Cross of São Francisco (Portuguese: Cruzeiro de São Francisco de Estremoz)
- Hermitage of Nossa Senhora da Conceição (Portuguese: Ermida de Nossa Senhora da Conceição)

== Notable people ==
- Etienne de Brito (1567–1641) a Roman Catholic prelate, Archbishop of Cranganore and Titular Bishop of Salona
- Francisco de Melo (1597–1651) a Portuguese nobleman who served as a Spanish general.
- João de Sousa Carvalho (1745– c.1798) the foremost Portuguese composer of his generation.
- António de Spínola (1910–1996) a Portuguese military officer, author and conservative politician
- Rita Rato (born 1983) a Portuguese politician and director of the Cadeia do Aljube museum
- Paulo Sérgio (born 1968) a Portuguese retired footballer with 331 club caps
