= Sartorius (surname) =

The surname Sartorius may refer to:

- Émile Sartorius, French footballer
- Euston Henry Sartorius, British Major General and brother of Reginald
- Georg Friedrich Sartorius, German historian
- George Rose Sartorius, British Admiral
- George William Sartorius, British painter
- Jacob Sartorius, American Internet personality and singer
- Luis José Sartorius, Spanish Prime Minister, 1853–54
- Norm Sartorius, American woodworker and artist
- Norman Sartorius, Croatian psychiatrist
- Paul Sartorius (field hockey), French hockey player
- Paul Sartorius (composer), German composer and organist
- Reginald William Sartorius, British Major General and brother of Euston
- Vicente Sartorius, Spanish nobleman and Olympic bobsledder
- Wolfgang Sartorius von Waltershausen, German geologist

== See also ==
- Sartorius family, English painters
