= Sartorius =

Sartorius may refer to:

- Sartorius (surname)
- Sartorius muscle, a long thin muscle that runs down the length of the thigh
- Sartorius Point on Viskyar Ridge, Antarctica
- Mr. Sartorius, a character in G.B. Shaw's Widowers' Houses
- Sartorius (Yu-Gi-Oh! GX), a fictional character in the anime television series
- Dr. Alex Sartorius, alias Doctor Phosphorus, in the DC comic universe
- Sartorius, a character in Stanislaw Lem's Solaris
- Sartorius AG, a pharmaceutical and laboratory equipment manufacturer
- "Sartorius", a song by Goldfrapp
- Doctor Erasmus Sartorius, one of the characters in the video game Zork: Nemesis
