= John Francis Sartorius =

English painter

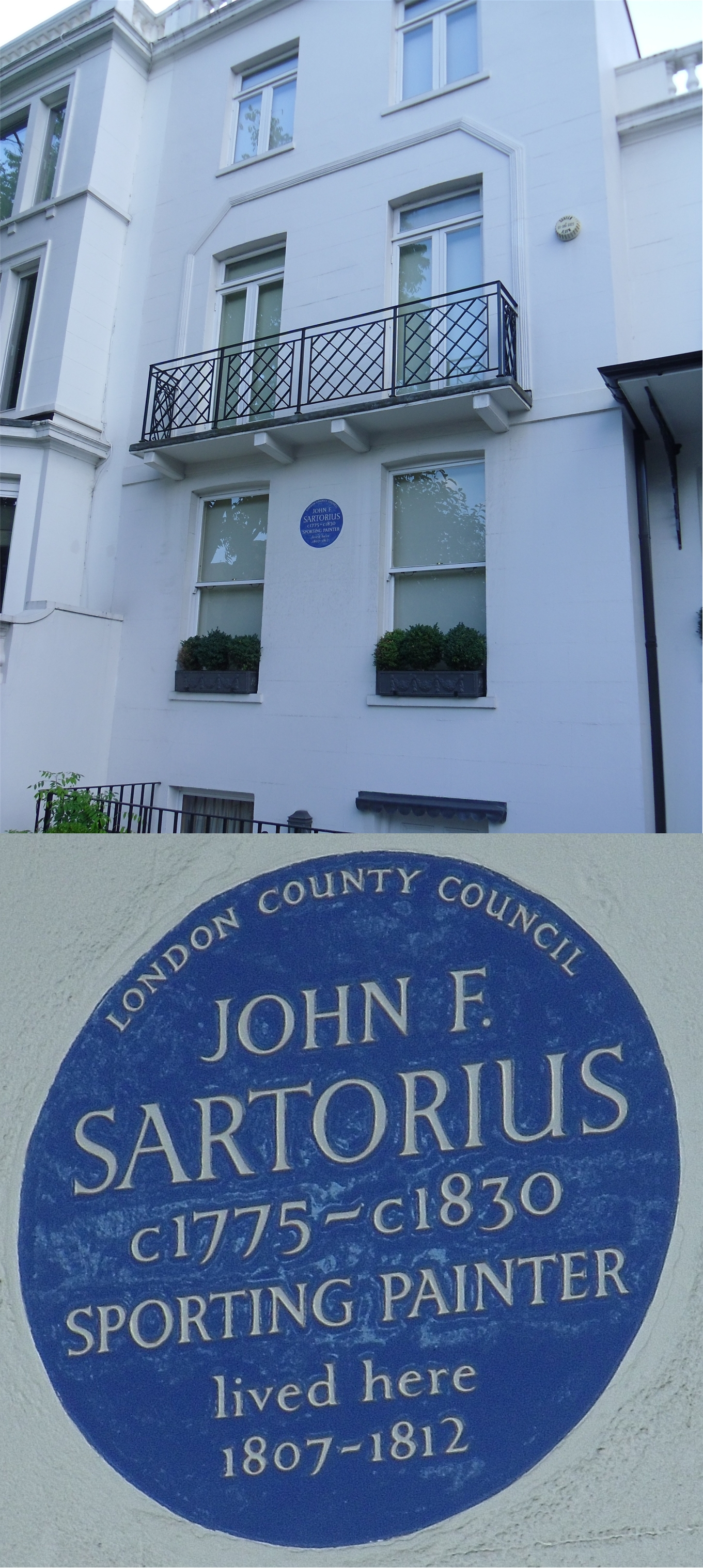
155 Old Church Street, Chelsea, London; the home of Sartorius between 1807 and 1812

John Francis Sartorius (fl.1775 – 1831) was an English painter of horses, horse-racing and hunting scenes, a member of the celebrated Sartorius family of artists.

== Life and work ==
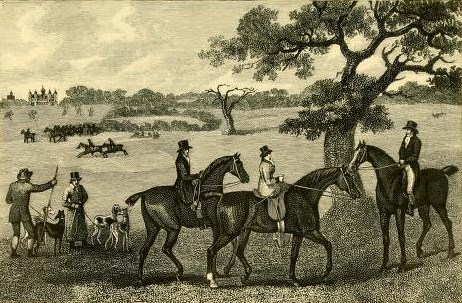
Coursing at Hatfield

John Francis was the son of artist John Nott Sartorius and grandson of Francis Sartorius. His younger brother Francis Sartorius Jr. ("the Younger") was a marine artist. He was less successful than his father with regard to the number of his patrons, though his thorough knowledge of sport is exemplified in his sporting pictures. He first exhibited at the Royal Academy in London in 1802, when he was residing at 17 King Street, Holborn. Afterwards he sent occasional contributions until 1827, the total number of pictures exhibited by him being 16.

Several of his paintings were engraved in The Sporting Magazine but as his father's works were appearing in the same periodical, and John Scott was engraving for both, it is somewhat difficult to differentiate the son's pictures from the father's, particularly as many of the plates were signed 'Sartorius' only. One of the best known of his pictures is 'Coursing in Hatfield Park,' exhibited at the Royal Academy in 1806, and depicting Emily Cecil, Marchioness of Salisbury, who rode daily in the park up to her eighty-sixth year.
