= John Nost Sartorius =

English painter of horses (1759–1828)

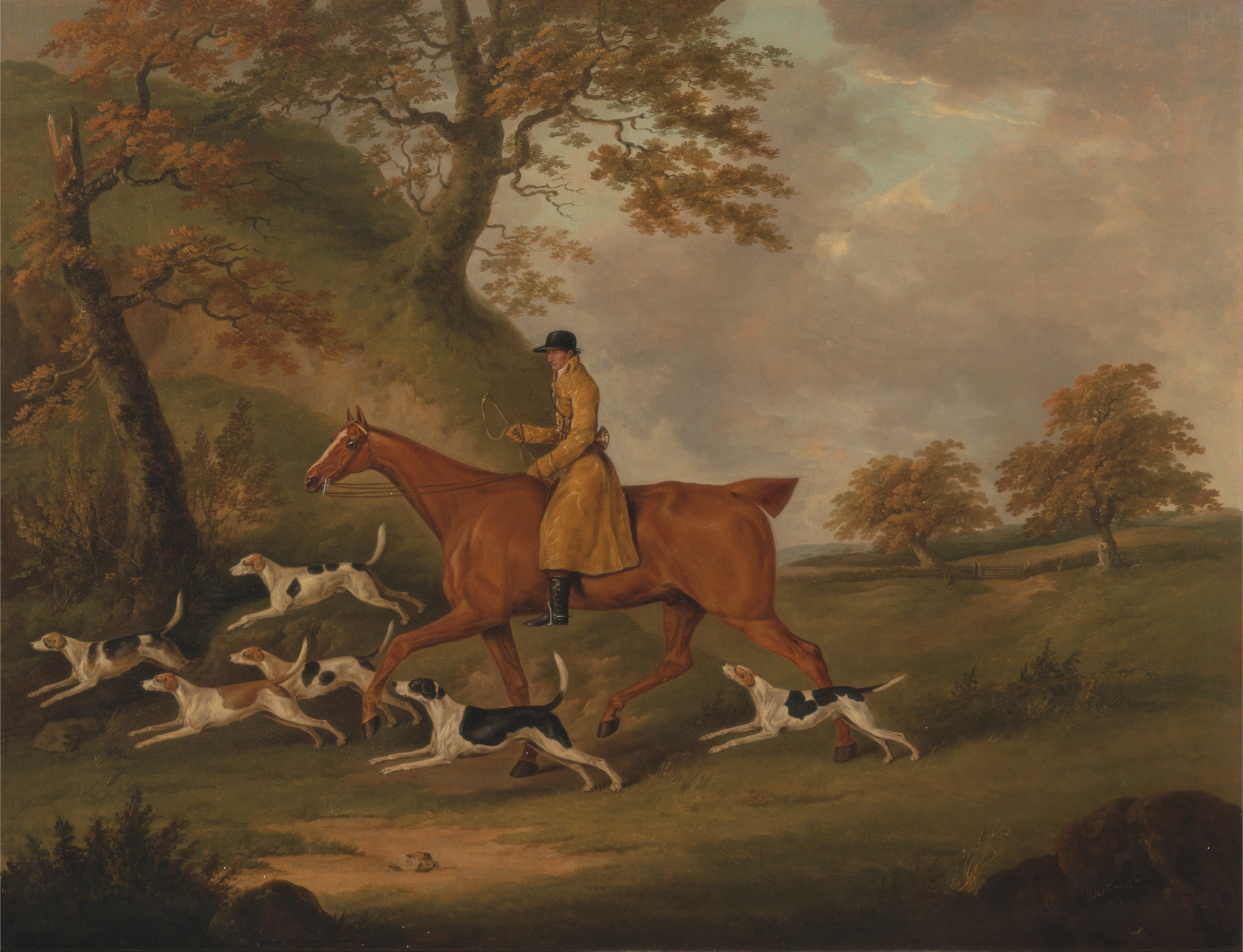
John Nost Sartorius - Huntsman and Hounds

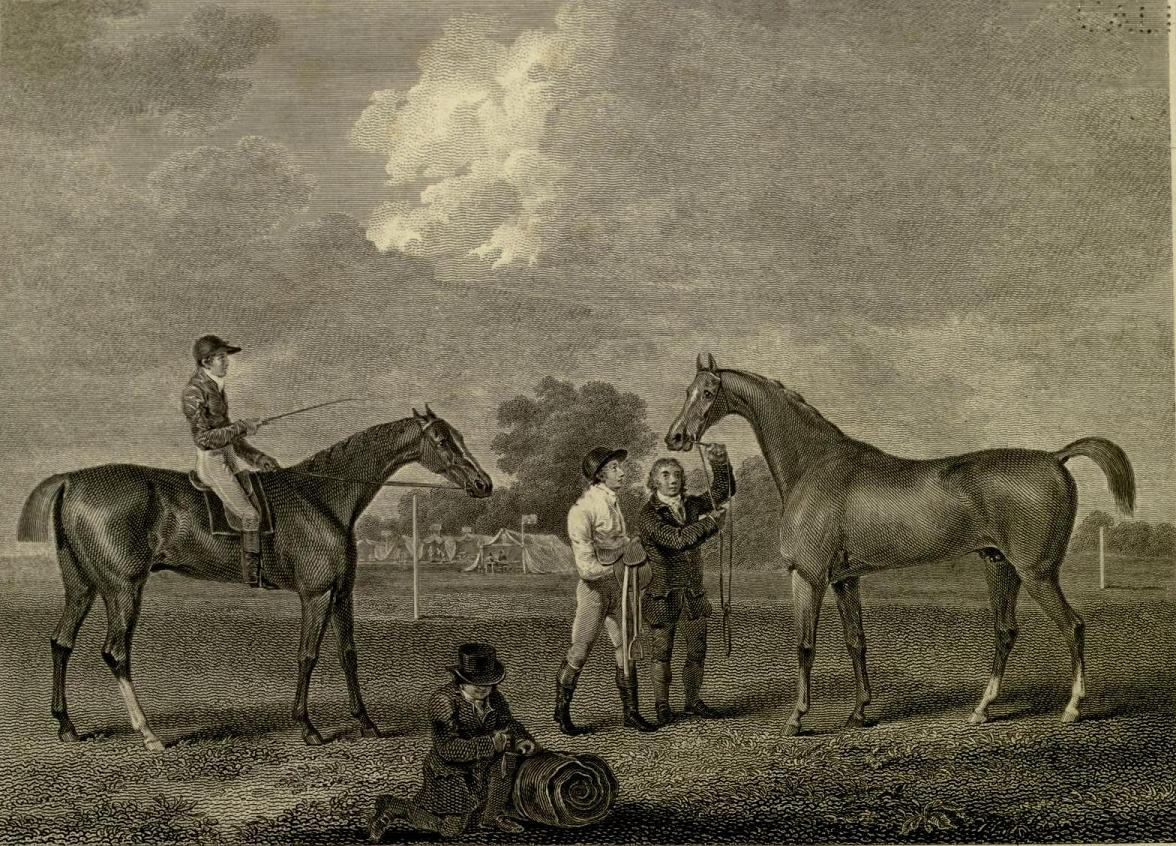
"Eclipse" and "Shakespeare" (engraving by John Scott after Sartorius)

John Nost Sartorius (1759–1828), was an English painter of horses, horse-racing and hunting scenes. He is considered the best-known and prolific of the Sartorius family of artists.

== Life and work ==
John Nost Sartorius was the son of horse-artist Francis Sartorius and the grandson of John Sartorius. He was patronised by the leading sportsmen of the day, such as the Prince of Wales, the Earl of Derby, Lord Foley, Sir Charles Bunbury, and many others, and his pictures (some of them of large size) were found in many country houses. He preferred to be known as John N. Sartorius Jr. to distinguish himself from his father and grandfather.

From 1781-1824 his name appeared as an exhibitor in the catalogues of the Royal Academy, and a list of the 74 pictures which he showed there can be found in Walter Gilbey's in "Animal painters of England from the year 1650, volume 2". "The Sporting Magazine" from 1795-1827 contained many engraved plates from his works by J. Walker, J. Webb, and others (for list see Gilbey).

Some of his best known pictures were portraits of the racehorse "Escape", belonging to the Prince of Wales, Sir Charles Bunbury's "Grey Diomed", a Mr. Robson's trotting mare "Phenomena", and the famous thoroughbred "Eclipse", from a drawing by his father (see "Sportsman's Repository" by John Scott, 1845). "A Set of Four Hunting Pieces" after his pictures, was published in 1790 by J. Harris, the plates being engraved by Peltro William Tomkins and James Neagle (1760?-1822).

John N. Sartorius died in 1828. Of his sons John Francis Sartorius was also an equine artist while the younger, Francis Sartorius Jr. ("the Younger") was a marine artist.
