= John Sartorius =

German painter

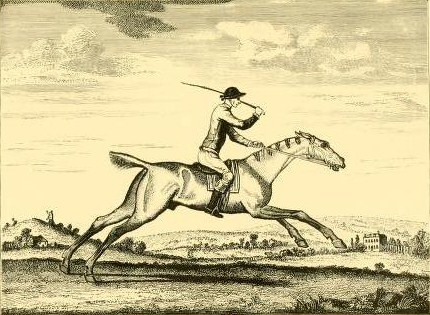
Looby at full stretch, 1735 (wood engraving by F. Babbage after Sartorius)

John Sartorius (1700? – 1780?) was an Anglo-German animal painter, the first of four generations of the celebrated Sartorius family of artists. He should not be confused with his great-grandson John Francis Sartorius.

== Life and work ==
Sartorious was born in Nuremberg in the Holy Roman Empire, first of four generations of artists who had a considerable vogue as painters of racehorses, hunters, and other sporting subjects. John's father was Jacob Christopher Sartorius (fl. 1694-1737), an engraver of Nuremberg. It is not certain what date John left Bavaria and settled in England.

The first picture of importance painted by Sartorius was for a Thomas Panton, around 1722, and represented a celebrated mare, "Molly", which had never been beaten on the turf except in the race which cost her her life. Among his other horse-portraits were those of the famous racehorse "Looby" (1735) for the Duke of Bolton; of "Old Traveller" (1741) for a Mr. William Osbaldeston; and "Careless" (1758) for the Duke of Kingston.

He showed only one picture at the Society of Artists, but exhibited 62 works at the Free Society of Artists. In 1780, he exhibited a portrait of a horse at the Royal Academy; Sartorius lived in London at 108 Oxford Street.

His son, and pupil, Francis Sartorius (1734–1804) was also a notable horse painter.
