= William Bruce (VC) =

Recipient of the Victoria Cross

- Born: 15 June 1890; Edinburgh, Scotland
- Died: 19 December 1914 (aged 24); Givenchy, France
- Burial place: Remembered on the Neuve-Chapelle Memorial
- Military career
- Allegiance: United Kingdom
- Branch: British Indian Army
- Service years: -1914 †
- Rank: Lieutenant
- Unit: 59th Scinde Rifles
- Conflicts: First World War; Battle of Givenchy †
- Awards: Victoria Cross

William Arthur McCrae Bruce VC (15 June 1890 – 19 December 1914) was a Scottish recipient of the Victoria Cross, the highest and most prestigious award for gallantry in the face of the enemy that can be awarded to British and Commonwealth forces, following his death in combat during the Battle of Givenchy in France during the First World War.

Born in Edinburgh on 15 June 1890, William Bruce was educated in Jersey, Channel Islands at Victoria College, Jersey. From here, he moved to the Royal Military College, Sandhurst, to complete his officer's training before entering combat during the Great War. Serving with the 59th Scinde Rifles of the Indian Army, he was posthumously awarded the Victoria Cross, the highest military award for valour.

== Details ==
He was 24 years old, and a Lieutenant in the 59th Scinde Rifles, British Indian Army during the First World War when the following deed took place for which he was awarded the VC.

His citation reads:

The late Lieutenant William Arthur McCrae Bruce, 59th Scinde Rifles (Frontier Force), Indian Army.

For most conspicuous bravery and devotion to duty. On the 19th December, 1914, near Givenchy, during a night attack, Lieutenant Bruce was in command of a small party which captured one of the enemy's trenches. In spite of being severely wounded in the neck, he walked up and down the trench, encouraging his men to hold on against several counter-attacks for some hours until killed. The fire from rifles and bombs was very heavy all day, and it was due to the skilful disposition made, and the example and encouragement shown by Lieutenant Bruce that his men were able to hold out until dusk, when the trench was finally captured by the enemy.

— London Gazette, 4 September 1919.

Bruce's Victoria Cross was bought by Victoria College, Jersey, the school in which he was educated. The school, in his honour, named one of the original four school houses after him. The others are Sartorius, Braithwaite and Dunlop, all (with the exception of Braithwaite, who was mentioned in dispatches) being old boys and recipients of the V.C. Recently an additional house, Diarmid, was created to honour a previously unknown V.C. recipient. The relevant citations are recited each year on Remembrance Day.

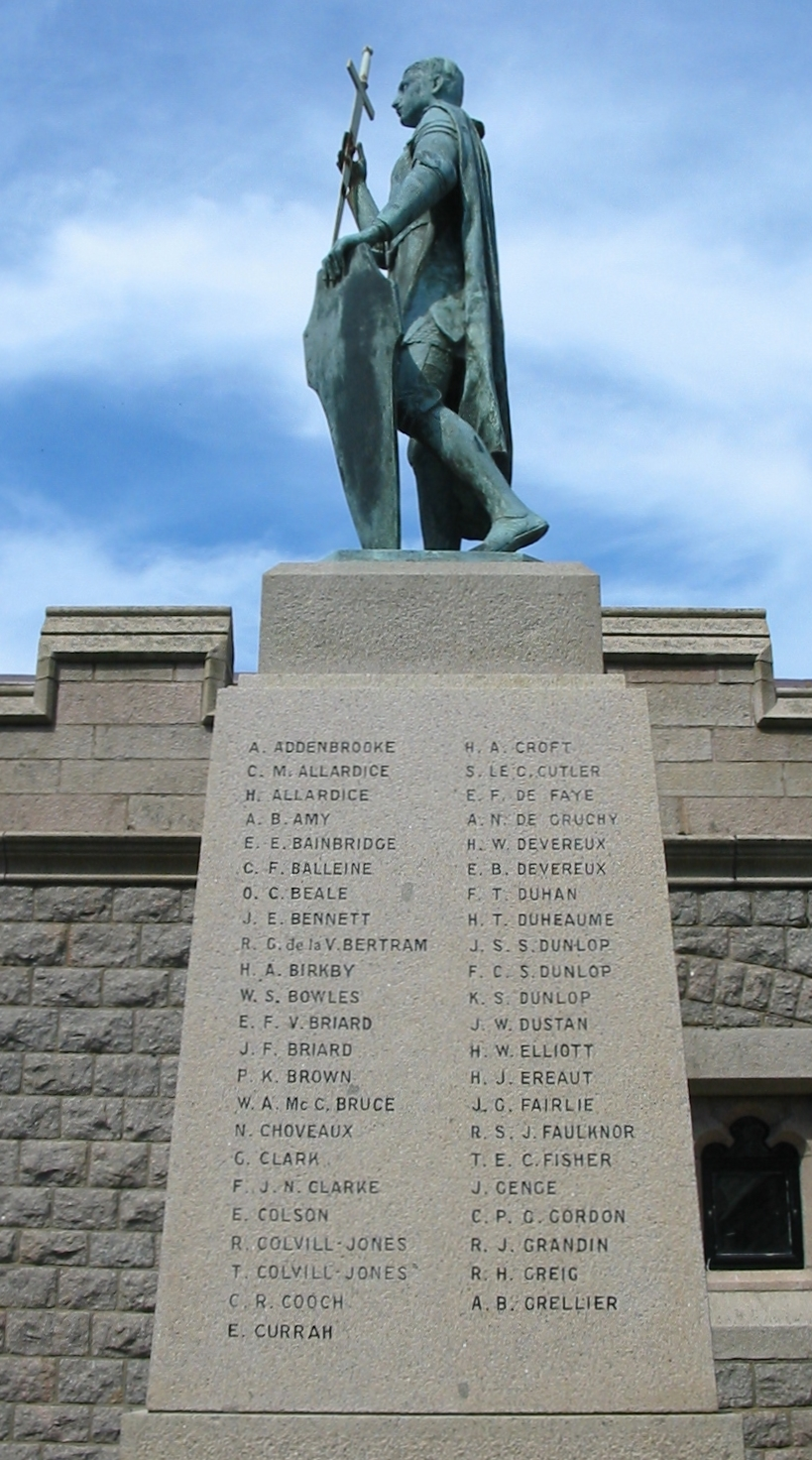
W. A. Mc C. Bruce's name is listed here on the war memorial of Victoria College, Jersey

== Bibliography ==
- Gliddon, Gerald (2011) [1994]. 1914. VCs of the First World War. The History Press. ISBN 978-0752459080.
- Ross, Graham (1995). Scotland's Forgotten Valour. MacLean Press. ISBN 978-1899272006.
