= Sartorius family =

English artistic family of German origin

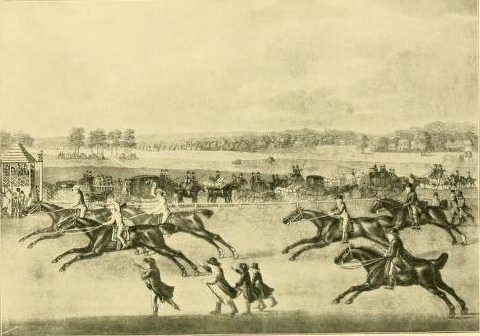
Ascot 1791, Oatland's Sweepstake (engraving by John Scott after John Nott Sartorius)

The Sartorius family of the 18th–19th centuries included several generations of English artists—of German origin—who mainly specialised in painting horses, horse-racing and hunting scenes:

- Jacob Christopher Sartorius (fl. 1694–1737), an engraver of Nuremberg, Germany.
- John Sartorius (c. 1700–1780). Painter of horses, horse-racing and hunting scenes. Son of Jacob Christopher. Born in Nuremberg but came over to England at some date.
- Francis Sartorius "the elder" (1734–1804). Painter of horses, horse-racing and hunting scenes. Son of John Sartorius.
- George William Sartorius (1759–1828). Painter of animals and still lifes.
- John Nott Sartorius (1759–1828). Also known as John N. Sartorius Jr. Painter of horses, horse-racing and hunting scenes. Son of Francis Sartorius.
- John Francis Sartorius (c. 1775 – c. 1831). Painter of horses, horse-racing and hunting scenes. Son of John Nott Sartorius, and brother of Francis Sartorius Jr.
- Francis Sartorius Jr. "the younger" (c. 1782 – c. 1808). Marine painter. Son of John Nott Sartorius, and brother of John Francis Sartorius.
