= George Sartorius =

Royal Navy Admiral of the Fleet (1790–1885)

Admiral of the Fleet Sir George Sartorius GCB
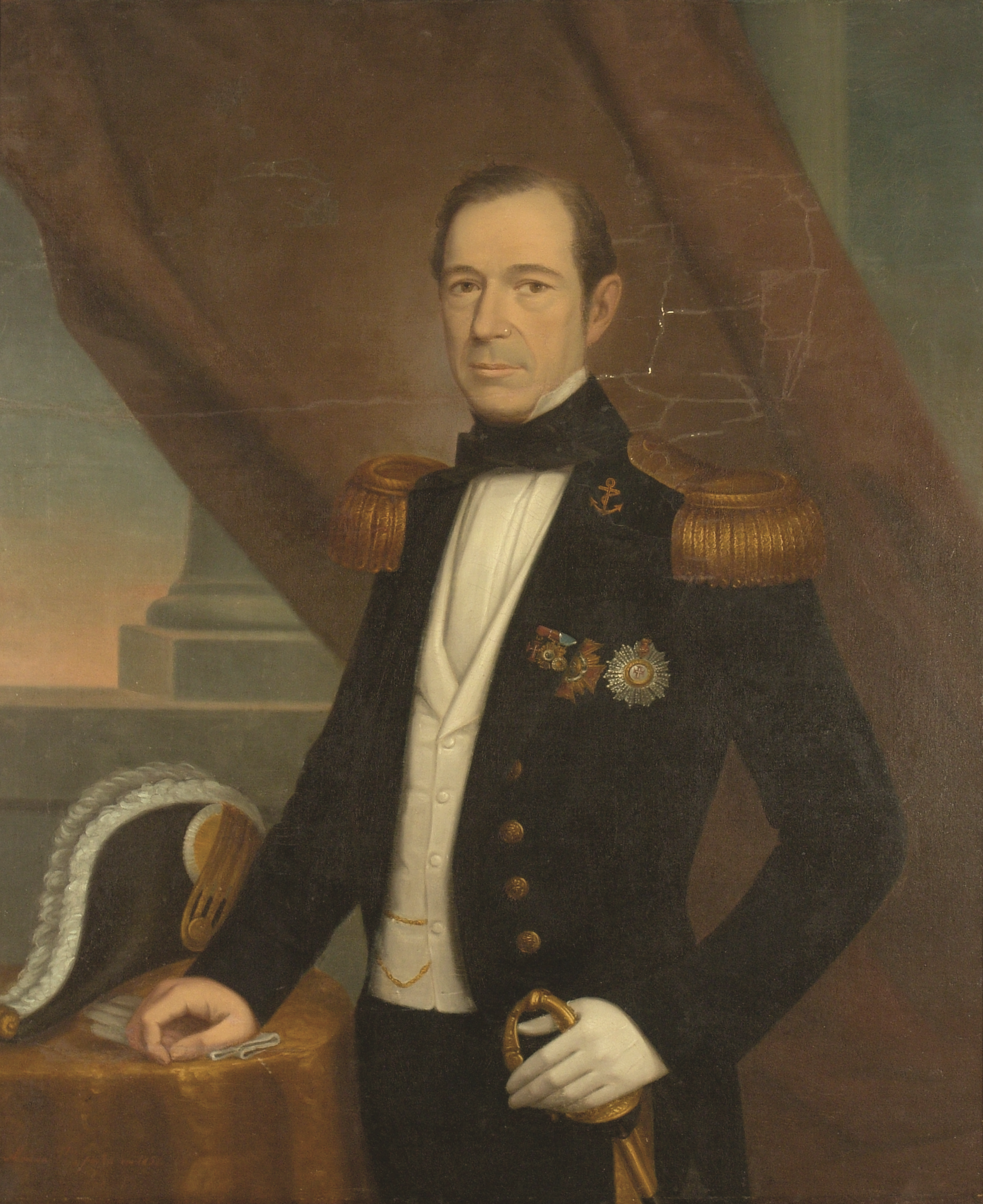
- Portrait by João de Almeida Santos, 1858
- Born: 9 August 1790; Bombay, India
- Died: 13 April 1885 (aged 94); Lymington, Hampshire
- Burial place: St. Mary's Church, South Baddesley, Hampshire
- Military career
- Allegiance: United Kingdom; Kingdom of Portugal
- Branch: Royal Navy; Portuguese Navy
- Service years: 1801–1832, 1836–1885 (UK); 1832–1833 (Portugal)
- Rank: Admiral of the Fleet (UK); Admiral (Portugal)
- Commands: HMS Snap; HMS Avon; HMS Slaney; HMS Pyramus; HMS Malabar; Queenstown
- Conflicts: Napoleonic Wars; Battle of Trafalgar; Battle of Montevideo; Siege of Cádiz; Portuguese Civil Wars; Siege of Porto
- Awards: Knight Grand Cross of the Order of the Bath; Grand Cross of the Order of Aviz; Knight Commander of the Order of the Tower and Sword; Naval General Service Medal with clasp Trafalgar

Sir George Rose Sartorius, GCB (9 August 1790 – 13 April 1885) was a British naval officer. After serving as a junior officer during the Napoleonic Wars, he was present, as a post-captain, at the surrender of Napoleon Bonaparte to Captain Frederick Maitland of Bellerophon at Rochefort. He later commanded the navy of Dom Pedro in the Portuguese Civil Wars. Dom Pedro was attempting to defeat his brother Dom Miguel, who had usurped the throne of Portugal, and to install Pedro's daughter as the rightful queen, Dona Maria II.

Sartorius went on to command Malabar in the Mediterranean Fleet and received on board Baldomero Espartero, the regent of Spain, who had been driven out by a coup d'état. Sartorius later served as commander-in-chief at Queenstown.

== Early career ==
Sartorius was born in Bombay, India, the eldest son of John Conrad Sartorius, a colonel in the Bombay Army's Bombay Pioneer Corps, and of Annabella, daughter of George Rose. He entered the Navy in June 1801, as a first-class volunteer, on board the yacht Mary, under the command of Captain Sir Harry Burrard-Neale. Between May 1802 and October 1804 he served aboard the frigates Fisgard and Naiad, commanded by Captain James Wallis on the Home Station, and was rated as a midshipman. He then joined the Tonnant, serving under Captains William Henry Jervis and Charles Tyler, seeing action under the latter at the battle of Trafalgar on 21 October 1805. After the battle he served as part of the prize crew, under Lieutenant James Stuart, on board the captured Spanish 74 Bahama.

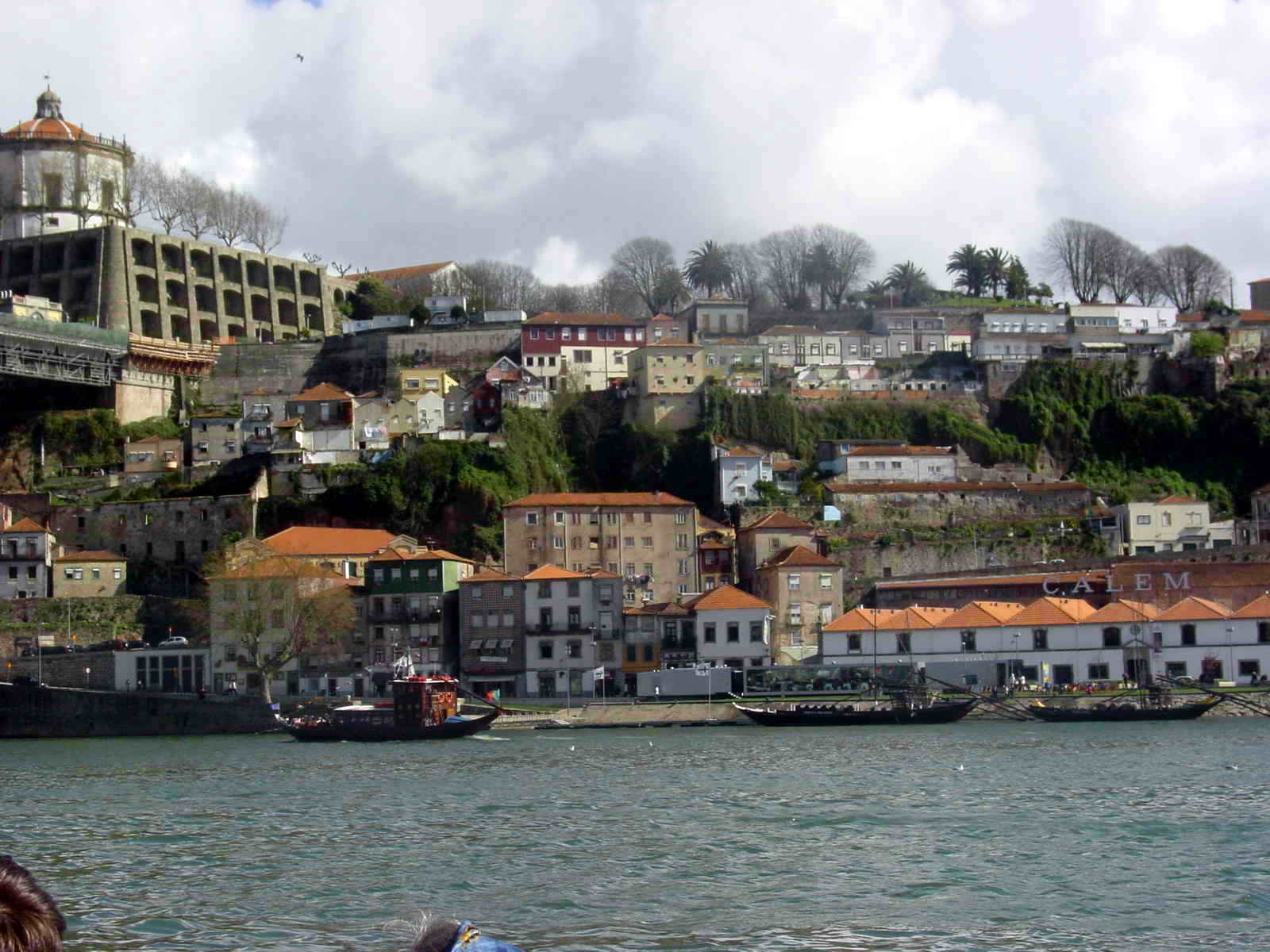
Serra do Pilar (left), stronghold of Dom Miguel's troops during the Siege of Porto

In June 1806 Sartorius joined the Daphne, Captain Francis Mason. He took part in the capture of Montevideo in February 1807, and participated in various operations in South America. He was promoted to lieutenant on 5 March 1808, into the frigate Success, Captain John Ayscough. There he was employed in protecting to the Greenland fisheries, before being sent to the Mediterranean Fleet, where he assisted at the reduction of the Phlegraean Islands of Ischia and Procida in June 1809, and operated in the defence of Sicily against the threatened invasion of Joachim Murat.

On 4 April 1810, Sartorius commanded the boats of the Success and brig Espoir, at the destruction of two vessels laden with oil, while under a heavy fire, on the beach near Castiglione, and on the 25th he assisted at the capture of an armed ship and three barques close to the castle of Terracina. After serving with the flotilla at the defence of Cádiz he was promoted to commander on 1 February 1812, and was appointed to the gun-brig Snap in August 1812, and then the brig-sloop Avon in July 1813, both on the Home Station. Promoted to post-captain on 6 June 1814, Sartorius commanded the 20-gun Slaney from December 1814 until August 1815, and was present at the surrender of Napoleon Bonaparte to Captain Frederick Maitland of Bellerophon at Rochefort on 15 July 1815. He went on to command the fifth-rate Pyramus during 1828.

== In Portuguese service ==
In 1831 Sartorius was engaged to command the small fleet of the ex-Emperor of Brazil, Dom Pedro, Duke of Braganza, in the attempt to defeat his brother Dom Miguel, who had usurped the throne of Portugal, and to install Pedro's daughter as the rightful queen, Dona Maria II. Sartorius conveyed Pedro's expeditionary force from the Azores and safely effected their Landing at Mindelo in July 1832, from where they were able to occupy Porto. Despite this success, he also had to contend with many difficulties; promised supplies rarely arrived, and his crews consequently became mutinous or deserted. Sartorius spent a great deal of his own money in keeping the fleet together. When he threatened to sail off with it until he was paid, Dom Pedro sent two English officers to the flagship; one to arrest Sartorius, the other to take command. Sartorius promptly confined them both aboard. In June 1833, Sartorius handed command over to Captain Sir Charles Napier. In consequence of serving in the armed forces of a foreign power, an offence under the 1819 Foreign Enlistment Act, his name was struck off the British Navy List, and was not restored until 1836.

For his services to the Portuguese, Sartorius was presented with the Grand Cross of the Order of Aviz, and created a Knight Commander of the Order of the Tower and Sword, and was made Viscount of the Piedade in 1832, and later became Viscount of Mindelo, and Count of Penha Firme.

== Later career ==
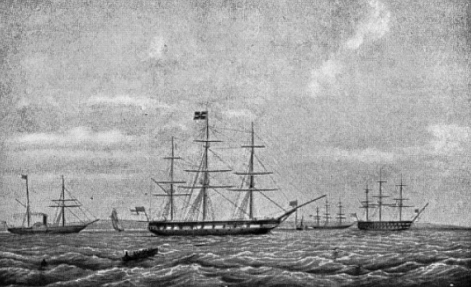
The sixth-rate Conway, Sartorius's flagship as commander-in-chief at Queenstown

On 21 August 1841 Sartorius received a knighthood from the Queen at Windsor Castle, and was also appointed to command of Malabar in the Mediterranean. In July 1843 off Cadiz he received on board Baldomero Espartero, the regent of Spain, who had been driven out by a coup d'état. He later received the thanks of the President and Congress of the United States for his efforts in saving the frigate USS Missouri, which caught fire at Gibraltar in August 1843. Malabar was paid off in 1844, and Sartorius saw no further service at sea, though he continued to take an active interest in naval affairs, becoming one of the earliest advocates of ram ships.

Sartorius was appointed a naval aide-de-camp to the Queen on 9 November 1846 and was promoted to rear-admiral on 9 May 1849. He served as commander-in-chief at Queenstown, with his flag in the sixth-rate Conway, from 1855 to 1856, receiving promotion to vice-admiral on 31 January 1856, and then to full admiral on 11 February 1861. He was appointed a Knight Commander of the Order of the Bath on 28 March 1865. He was then appointed the Vice-Admiral of the United Kingdom and Lieutenant of the Admiralty on 1 March 1869 and was promoted to Admiral of the Fleet on 2 July 1869. He was advanced to Knight Grand Cross of the Order of the Bath on 23 April 1880.

Sartorius died at his home at Lymington in Hampshire on 13 April 1885, and is buried at the Church of St. Mary the Virgin, South Baddesley, while the east window of the nearby Church of St. Thomas the Apostle, Lymington is dedicated to him. His son Reginald is also buried at South Baddesley.

== Personal life ==
In 1839 he married Sophia, a daughter of John Lamb, and had three sons and three daughters: All three boys became Army officers:

- Colonel George Conrad Sartorius (1840–1912)
- Major General Reginald William Sartorius (1841–1907)
- Major General Euston Henry Sartorius (1844–1925)

Two of his sons were awarded the Victoria Cross, Reginald during the Third Anglo-Ashanti War, and Euston during the Second Anglo-Afghan War.

- Rose Sartorius (d.1905)
- Sophia Isabella Sartorius
- Margaret Emily Georgina Sartorius (1850–1942)

== See also ==
- O'Byrne, William Richard (1849). "Sartorius, George Rose" . A Naval Biographical Dictionary . John Murray – via Wikisource.

== Sources ==
- Heathcote, Tony (2002). The British Admirals of the Fleet 1734 – 1995. Pen & Sword. ISBN 0-85052-835-6.

Military offices
| Preceded by John Purvis | Commander-in-Chief, Queenstown; 1855–1856 | Succeeded by Henry Chads |
Honorary titles
| Preceded by Sir William Bowles | Vice-Admiral of the United Kingdom; March 1869–July 1869 | Succeeded by Sir Fairfax Moresby |
