= Reginald Sartorius =

Recipient of the Victoria Cross

Reginald Sartorius VC CMG
- Born: 8 May 1841; Sintra, Portugal
- Died: 8 August 1907 (aged 66); Cowes, Isle of Wight
- Burial place: St Mary's Churchyard, South Baddesley
- Relatives: Admiral of the Fleet Sir George Rose Sartorius (father); Major General Euston Henry Sartorius VC (brother)
- Military career
- Allegiance: United Kingdom
- Branch: British Indian Army
- Rank: Major General
- Conflicts: Indian Mutiny; Bhutan War; Third Anglo-Ashanti War; Second Anglo-Afghan War
- Awards: Victoria Cross; Order of St Michael and St George

Major General Reginald William Sartorius VC CMG (8 May 1841 – 8 August 1907) was an army officer, and a recipient of the Victoria Cross, the highest and most prestigious award for gallantry in the face of the enemy that can be awarded to British and Commonwealth forces.

== Life ==
Educated at Victoria College, Jersey, Sartorius entered the Indian Army in January 1858. He joined the Bengal infantry, became a lieutenant in May 1858 and served in the Indian Mutiny (1858) and the Bhutan War (1864–65). In 1873, as a captain, Sartorius took part in the First Ashanti Expedition, in modern-day Ghana.

=== VC action ===
Sartorius was a 32 year old captain in the 6th Bengal Cavalry, British Indian Army, during the First Ashanti Expedition when the following deed took place at Abogu in the Ashanti Region, for which he was awarded the VC. His citation read:

For having during the attack on Abogoo, on the 17th January [1874], removed from under a heavy fire Serjeant-Major Braimah Doctor, a Housa Non-Commissioned Officer, who was mortally wounded, and placed him under cover.

For his Ashanti service, Sartorius was also twice mentioned in dispatches, promoted to brevet major, and made a companion of the Order of St Michael and St George.

=== Later career ===
Sartorius served in the Second Anglo-Afghan War (1878–80) and in 1886 became a colonel. His active career came to an end in 1893, when he left India and went to live in Italy. In 1895 he was promoted to major-general, Bengal infantry, and in 1897 was placed on the retired list.

He retired to Haslemere, Surrey. He was a member of the Royal Yacht Squadron, and died suddenly on 8 August 1907 when sailing at Cowes, Isle of Wight. He was buried St Mary's Churchyard, South Baddesley, Hampshire.

== Family ==
His father was Admiral of the Fleet Sir George Rose Sartorius. He had two brothers, both of whom entered the army: George Conrad Sartorius, who retired as a colonel, and Major General Euston Henry Sartorius, who was also awarded the VC.

In 1877 Sartorius married Agnes Maria Kemp. They had a son and a daughter. The son, Gerald, also served in the Indian Army, and received the Military Cross for service during the Third Anglo-Afghan War in 1919.

One of Victoria College Jersey's five Houses was later named 'Sartorius' after the three brothers, all of whom attended the school.

== The medal ==
His Victoria Cross is held by the National Army Museum, Chelsea, London.
