= Euston Sartorius =

Recipient of the Victoria Cross

Major-General Euston Sartorius VC CB
- Born: 6 June 1844; Sintra, Portugal
- Died: 19 February 1925 (aged 80); Chelsea, London, England
- Burial place: St Peter and St Paul's Churchyard, Ewhurst, Surrey
- Relatives: Admiral of the Fleet Sir George Rose Sartorius (father); Major General Reginald William Sartorius VC (brother)
- Military career
- Allegiance: United Kingdom
- Branch: British Army
- Rank: Major-General
- Units: 59th Regiment of Foot; East Lancashire Regiment
- Conflicts: Second Anglo-Afghan War; 1882 Anglo-Egyptian War
- Awards: Victoria Cross; Order of the Bath; Order of Osmanieh (Ottoman Empire)

Major-General Euston Henry Sartorius VC CB (6 June 1844 – 19 February 1925) was a British Army officer and a recipient of the Victoria Cross (VC), the highest and most prestigious award for gallantry in the face of the enemy that can be awarded to British and Commonwealth forces. His brother Reginald was also awarded the VC.

== Life ==
Sartorius was educated at Victoria College, Jersey, then the Royal Naval School, New Cross. He then decided on an army career and attended the Royal Military Academy, Woolwich, followed by the Royal Military College, Sandhurst. In 1862 he joined the 59th (2nd Nottinghamshire) Regiment of Foot as an ensign. In June 1869 at Broadstairs he rescued three girls from drowning, for which he received the Bronze Medal of the Royal Humane Society.

In the 1870s, he spent four years as military surveying instructor at Sandhurst, and then travelled for a year overland, via Persia, to India to rejoin his regiment. When the Second Anglo-Afghan War (1878–80) broke out, the 59th Foot formed part of the southern Afghanistan Field Force, serving in and around Kandahar. In October 1879 Sartorius was part of a British advance upon a large Ghilzais force assembling at Shahjui. Under fire from British artillery, the Ghilzais retreated, taking refuge in an old hill-top fort. Sartorius won his VC for leading a small force that captured this fort.

=== VC action ===
Sartorius was a 35 year old captain in the 59th (2nd Nottinghamshire) Regiment of Foot (later The East Lancashire Regiment), British Army, during the Second Anglo-Afghan War when the following deed took place on 24 October 1879 at Shahjui, Afghanistan for which he was awarded the VC:

For conspicuous bravery during the action at Sliah-jui, on the 24th October, 1879, in leading a party of five or six men of the 59th Regiment against a body of the enemy, of unknown strength, occupying an almost inaccessible position on the top of a precipitous hill. The nature of the ground made any sort of regular formation impossible, and Captain Sartorius had to bear the first brunt of the attack from the whole body of the enemy, who fell upon him and his men as they gained the top of the precipitous pathway; but the gallant and determined bearing of this Officer, emulated as it was by his men, led to the most perfect success, and the surviving occupants of the hill top, seven in number, were all killed. In this encounter Captain Sartorius was wounded by sword cuts in both hands, and one of his men was killed.

For his Afghan service, he was also made brevet major, and twice mentioned in dispatches.

=== Later career ===
Due to wounds received during his VC action, Sartorius partially lost the use of his left hand. Unable to continue as an active field officer, he was appointed to a staff post at Aldershot. In the 1882 Anglo-Egyptian War he was made deputy assistant adjutant-general and quartermaster-general, responsible for base and communications. For this, he was made brevet lieutenant-colonel, mentioned in dispatches, and received the fourth-class Order of Osmanieh. He became a colonel in 1886, and was assistant adjutant-general in Portsmouth from 1891 to 1894. In 1896 he was made a companion of the Order of the Bath, and went to Japan as military attaché. After promotion to major general in 1899, he retired in August 1901 but continued as colonel of the South Lancashire Regiment in November 1909, taking over from Major General Sir Frederick Solly-Flood.

In retirement he lived at Holmbury St Mary, Surrey, and in London. Following a short illness he died at his residence in Chelsea, London, on 19 February 1925. He was buried at St Peter and St Paul's Churchyard, Ewhurst, Surrey.

== Family ==
His father was Admiral of the Fleet Sir George Rose Sartorius. He had two elder brothers, both of whom also entered the army: George Conrad Sartorius, who retired as a colonel, and Major General Reginald William Sartorius, who was also awarded the VC. One of Victoria College Jersey's five Houses was later named 'Sartorius' after the three brothers, all of whom attended the school.

He succeeded his father as Count of Penhafirme in the Portuguese nobility, and was confirmed in the title by King Carlos I on 20 June 1903. On 22 December 1874 he married Emily Jane, daughter of Sir Francis Cook, 1st Viscount of Monserrate; their son Euston Francis Frederick Sartorius was born in 1882 and served in the Grenadier Guards.

== The medal ==
His Victoria Cross is held by the National Army Museum, Chelsea, London.
