= Francis Sartorius =

English painter (1734–1804)

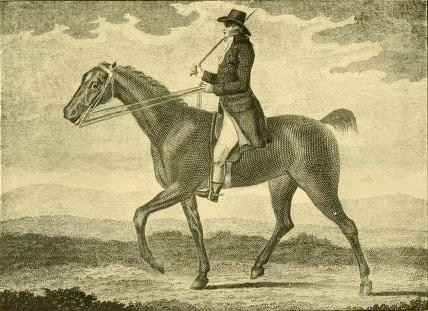
Portrait of Mr. Bishop's celebrated "trotting mare" (engraving after Sartorius)

Francis Sartorius (1734 – 5 March 1804) was an English painter of horses, horse-racing and hunting scenes, of the celebrated Sartorius family of artists. Also known as Francis Sartorius the Elder to distinguish him from his grandson Francis Sartorius Jr. ("the Younger").

== Life and work ==
Francis was the son and pupil of John Sartorius. His first important work was a portrait of the racehorse "Antinous" (foaled 1758), for the Duke of Grafton. Other horse-portraits were "Herod" (foaled 1758) for the Duke of Cumberland; "Snap" for a Mr. Latham; "Cardinal Ruff" for a Mr. Shafto; and "Bay Malton" for the Marquis of Rockingham. Several of these portraits were engraved by John June (fl. 1740-70), and published between 1760 and 1770.

Sartorius was a prolific and popular painter, and it is said that he produced more portraits of the famous race-horse "Eclipse" during the zenith of his fame than all other contemporary artists together (Bailys Magazine, January 1897, p. 23). He was a contributor to "The Sporting Magazine" and in vols. ii-vi. (1793–1795) are four excellent engravings from his works, including the famous racehorse "Waxey" (sired by the notable thoroughbred "Pot-8-Os").

Francis contributed 38 works for exhibition at various London galleries including twelve to the Royal Academy, 7 to the Society of Artists and 20 to the Free Society of Artists. He lived in London during the years he was exhibiting, finally residing in Soho, London at 17 Gerrard Street. He died on 5 March 1804, in his 70th year.

He married five times, his fifth wife predeceasing him before him in January 1804. His son John Nost Sartorius (1759–1828) was also a notable horse artist, the most distinguished of the family.
