= George William Sartorius =

English painter (1759–1828)

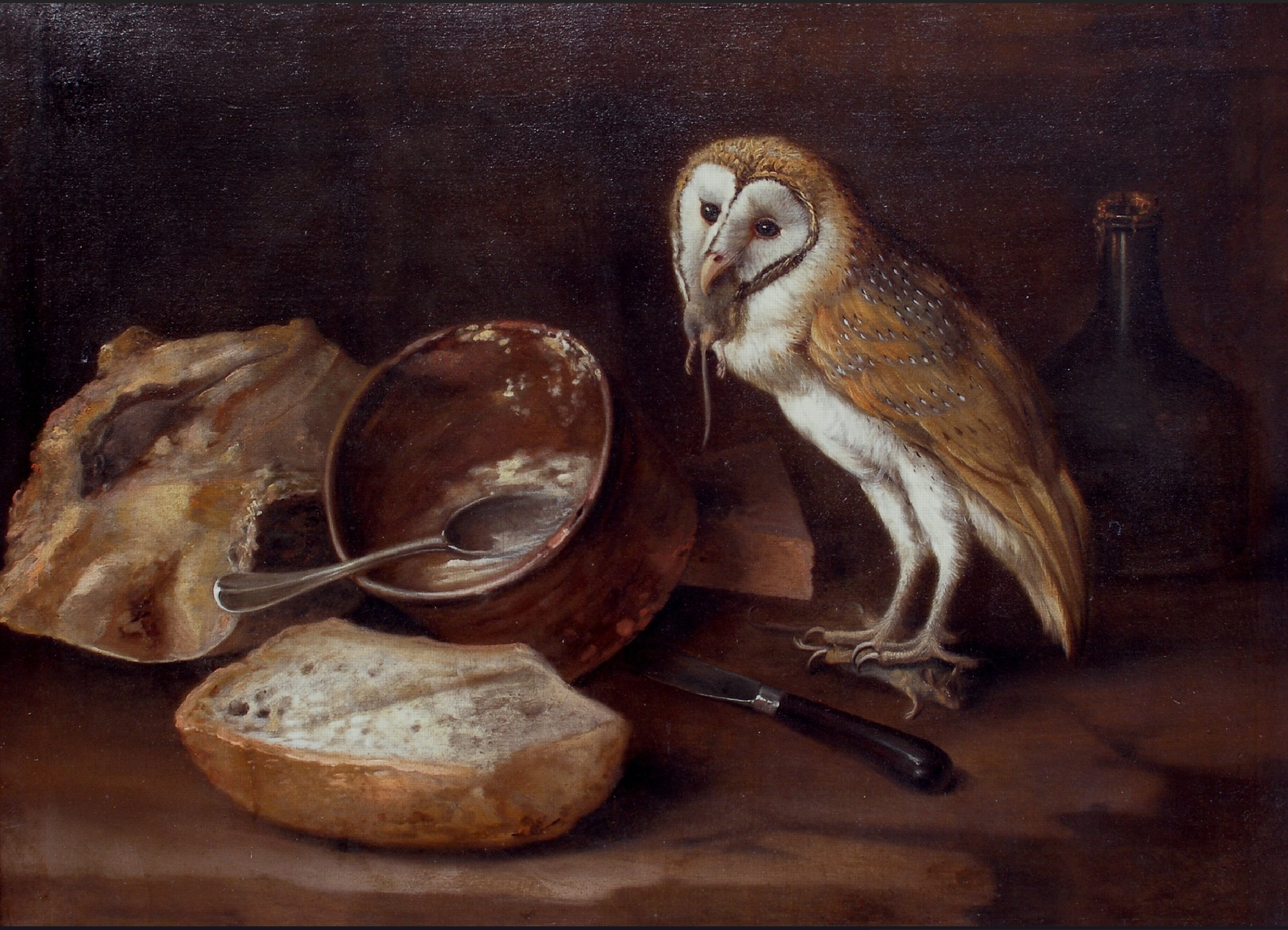
An Owl's Lunch

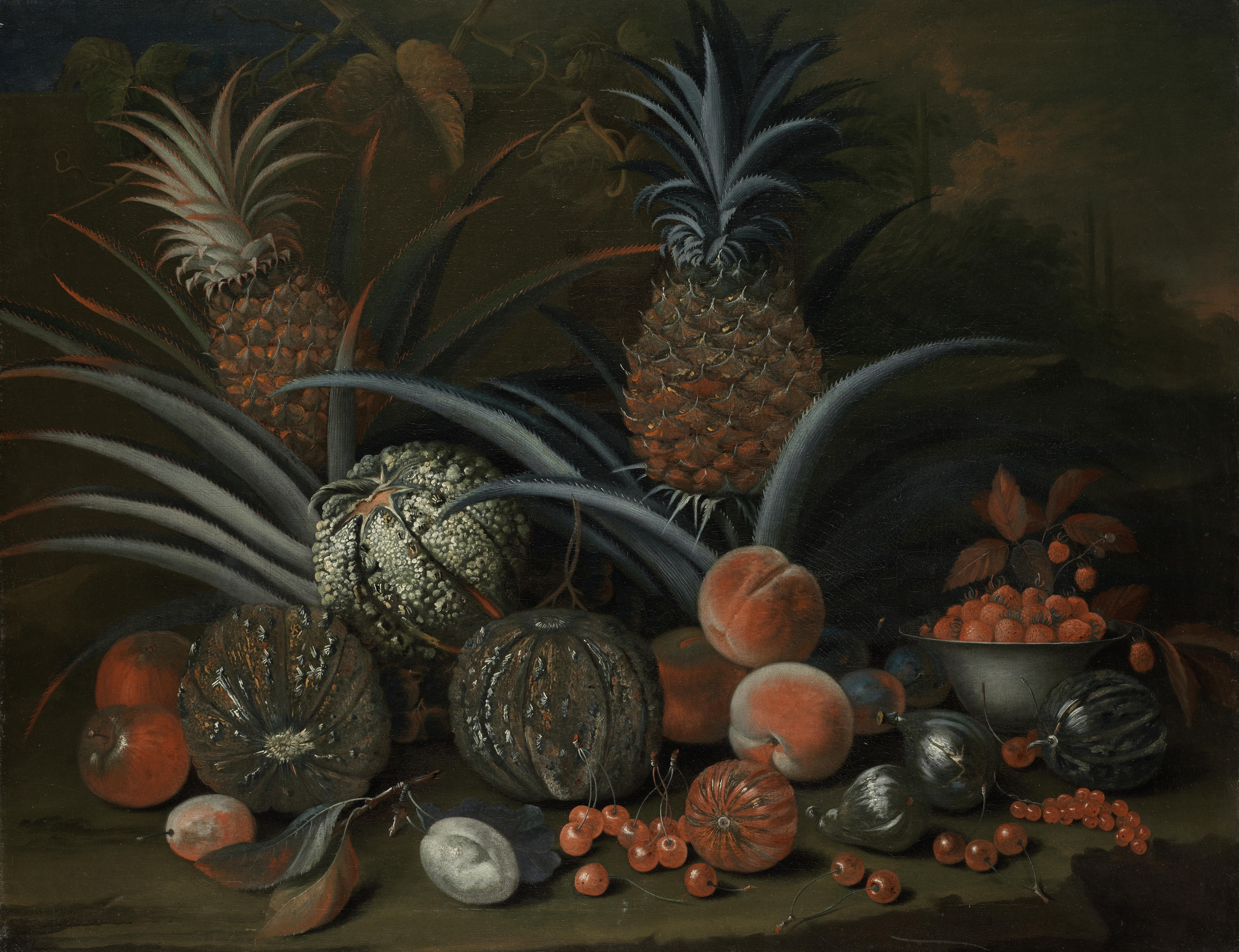
Strawberries in a porcelain bowl, with pineapples, melons, peaches and figs, before a tropical landscape

George William Sartorius (1759–1828) was a British artist. The Sartorius family were painters of sporting activities. Sartorius specialised in animals and still lifes. He exhibited at the Free Society of Artists from 1773 to 1779.
